= Only Mama Knows (Grey's Anatomy) =

- Grey's Anatomy episode
- Richard tells Meredith the truth about her mother's past.
- Episode no.: Season 11; Episode 4
- Directed by: Nicole Rubio
- Written by: Mark Driscoll
- Original air date: October 16, 2014
- Running time: 43 minutes

Guest appearances
- Annet Mahendru as Ana; Sally Pressman as Young Ellis Grey; J. August Richards as Young Richard Webber; Kate Burton as Ellis Grey

Episode chronology
| ← Previous "Got to Be Real" | Next → "Bend & Break" |
- Grey's Anatomy season 11

"Only Mama Knows" is the fourth episode of the eleventh season of the American television medical drama Grey's Anatomy, and is the 224th episode overall. Written by Mark Driscoll, and directed by Jesse Bochco, the episode originally aired on the American Broadcasting Company (ABC) in the United States on October 16, 2014.

The episode delves into Meredith Grey's (Ellen Pompeo) troubled childhood and strained relationship with her mother, the world-renowned surgeon Ellis Grey (Kate Burton) and Richard Webber (James Pickens Jr.), while Meredith also navigates difficulties in her marriage with Derek Shepherd (Patrick Dempsey).

The episode reveals secrets from Ellis Grey's past as Meredith uncovers old videos and reads her mother's journals, providing new insights into her complicated life. Meanwhile, Maggie Pierce (Kelly McCreary) shocks the hospital with a surprising announcement. Alex Karev (Justin Chambers) finds Arizona Robbins (Jessica Capshaw), who asks him to check on one of her patients as she struggles to keep up with the workload assigned by Nicole Herman (Geena Davis). Callie Torres (Sara Ramirez) focuses on the Veterans' project, while Owen Hunt (Kevin McKidd) and Miranda Bailey (Chandra Wilson) confront Jackson Avery (Jesse Williams) after reading an email from Maggie about her resignation.

On its initial airing, the episode was watched by 8.43 million viewers and received universal acclaim from critics, with many considering it one of the best episodes of the entire series.

== Plot ==
The episode opens with a voice-over narration from Meredith Grey (Ellen Pompeo) and Ellis Grey (Kate Burton) about the imperfection of memory and how both our mistakes and successes shape who we become.

In a series of flashbacks, Meredith Grey (Ellen Pompeo) and Richard Webber (James Pickens Jr.) come to terms with their past relationships with Ellis Grey (Kate Burton). In her search for understanding the revelation of having a half-sister, Meredith delves into her mother’s diaries and video footage. Meanwhile, Alex Karev (Justin Chambers) learns that the board’s vote to replace Cristina Yang (Sandra Oh) was not as close as Arizona Robbins (Jessica Capshaw) had led him to believe—it was actually unanimous in favor of Miranda Bailey (Chandra Wilson). Alex confronts Arizona about the lie, and she confides in him that she didn’t vote for him because she wanted to hire him as the new pediatrics attending. Her goal was to step back and focus on her fetal surgery fellowship and to help save her marriage. Bailey also finds out from Richard about Maggie Pierce's (Kelly McCreary) true identity when she tries to reverse Maggie’s decision to leave Grey Sloan Memorial Hospital.

Richard reveals to Meredith that the day at the carousel was when he left Ellis for good. He remained with Adele (Loretta Devine) because of his jealousy and hatred towards Ellis’ first Harper Avery award nomination for the Grey Method. Before Richard could tell Adele the truth, he realized he would spend his entire life in Ellis' shadow. This realization led him to leave Ellis, which resulted in Ellis attempting suicide after returning home.

Derek Shepherd (Patrick Dempsey) reconnects with Meredith and puts a halt to their fighting. Though Meredith initially resists, Derek insists on a truce because she has a sister now, and he needs to ensure she’s okay. Meredith then recalls a suppressed memory of her mother being pregnant. She remembers Ellis' water breaking on the kitchen floor and the fear it caused, as it reminded her of Ellis' previous suicide attempt. She also recalls how Ellis moved them across town after giving birth and began her fellowship while Meredith started first grade.

Before Maggie can leave the hospital, Meredith approaches her and shows her something significant. She pulls out Ellis' journal from 1983 and shares what she can with Maggie. While Ellis wasn’t warm, the journal reveals something important: wine stains that marked Ellis' nightly reflections stop around the time she discovered her pregnancy. These stains are replaced with meticulous lists of everything she ate, showing her commitment to having a healthy baby. Though it's not much, it demonstrates that Ellis tried to care for her child.

This revelation leads to a profound change in Meredith's heart regarding Maggie. As she reflects, memories are “our most valuable possessions. They made us who we are.” With this new perspective, Meredith begins to accept Maggie as her sister.

== Production ==
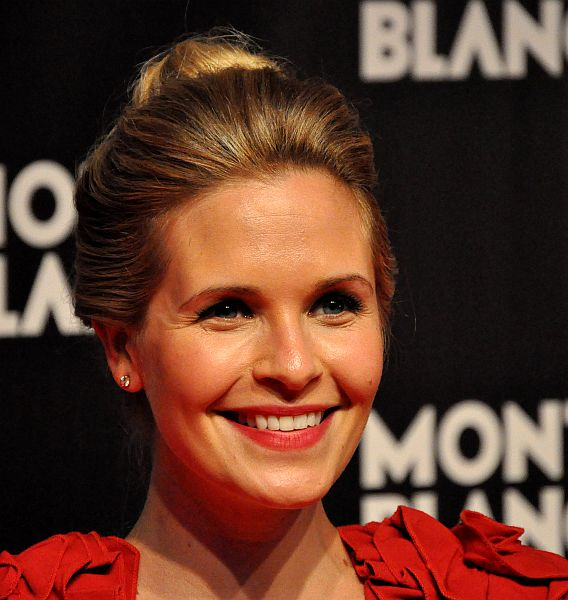
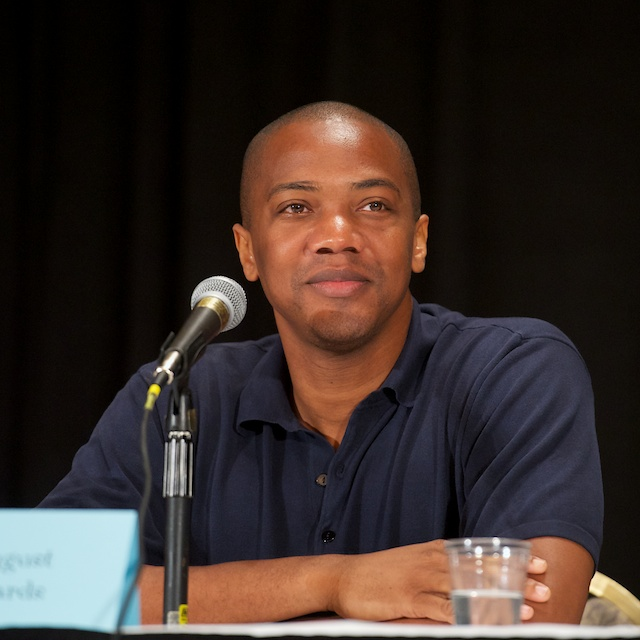
Sally Pressman and J. August Richards reprised their roles as a young Ellis Grey and Richard Webber.

During an interview, Shonda Rhimes revealed that "Season 11 is really a Meredith-centric season", as the character faces significant changes in her life. Rhimes explained, "She lost her ‘person’, her half-sister has shown up, her husband is chafing to go someplace else..." She shared that she had been wanting to explore the "familial grenade" storyline for a long time and felt that the end of Season 10 was the right moment to introduce it. In another discussion of this storyline, Rhimes mentioned that she and the writers were considering using flashbacks to explore the younger days of Ellis Grey and Richard Webber.

Initially, it was unclear who would portray the younger version of Ellis Grey. Both Kate Burton and Sarah Paulson had played the character in earlier seasons, albeit during different time periods. However, on August 6, 2014, it was confirmed that Burton would reprise her role in flashbacks for the Season 11 premiere.

Despite this confirmation, on September 25, 2014, it was announced that while Burton had filmed scenes for the Season 11 premiere, they were ultimately cut from the episode. Nevertheless, Burton was still set to appear in flashbacks later in the season. Sally Pressman (Army Wives) was later cast to play the younger Ellis Grey for these scenes. Paulson, who previously played young Ellis in Season 6, was unable to reprise her role due to scheduling conflicts with her work on American Horror Story: Freak Show. J. August Richards was confirmed to reprise his role as a young Richard Webber.

== Reception ==
=== Broadcast ===
"Only Mama Knows" aired on October 16, 2014, on the American Broadcasting Company (ABC) in the United States. Upon its initial release, the episode was watched by 8.43 million viewers and garnered a 2.4/8 Nielsen rating, ranking at No. 22 in 18-49 key demographic and as the 8th most-watched drama of the night.

=== Reviews ===
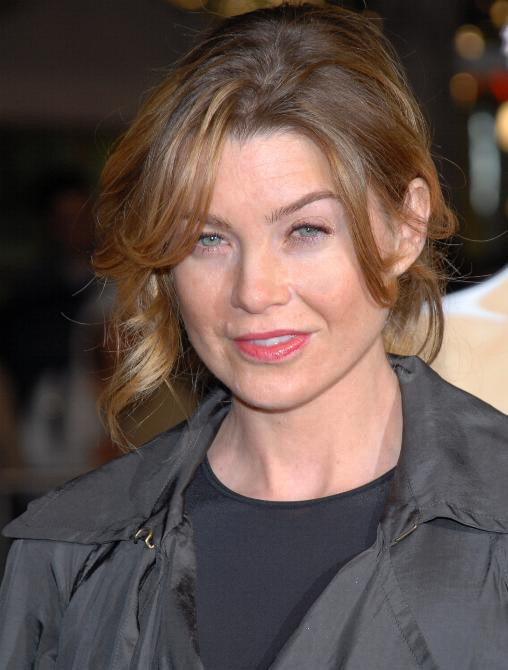
The story-arc of Ellen Pompeo's character, Meredith Grey's past received widespread praise.

"Only Mama Knows" received universal acclaim, with numerous critics calling it "one of the best of Grey's Anatomy".

TV Fanatic praised the episode, stating, "I don't think I've ever appreciated an episode like the way I did with 'Only Mama Knows'. Well done, Shonda Rhimes and co. I loved every bit of it. I thought this installment was incredible. I found it fascinating and really thought it fit well for a Throwback Thursday kind of night."

Examiner gave the episode rave reviews, highlighting the episode's premise, "Grey’s Anatomy aired the beautifully written and played all-new episode 'Only Mama Knows' on Oct. 16. Through exceptional use of flashbacks, Meredith finally remembers that her mother was pregnant following her suicide attempt. These repressed memories that resurface are very sad. Meredith Grey endured two terribly traumatic experiences at a very young age. No wonder she is a complicated, dark and twisty adult. The editing on this episode is extraordinary. Using old clips of Ellis to tell a new story was simply brilliant and totally upped the emotional stakes for Meredith (Ellen Pompeo), Richard Webber (James Pickens Jr.), and Maggie Pierce (Kelly McCreary) moving forward."

Entertainment Weekly called it "great drama", adding, "It was also throwing us back to the type of episode we expected from this show in the early seasons, the type of episode that gave you chills and reminded you why this show is so good at drama." The review concluded by stating, "If this is what we can expect from a 'Season of Meredith Grey,' then count me in. Seriously."

ScreenSpy said the episode ranked among Grey’s classics, adding, "'Only Mama Knows' was so good I kept checking my watch to see if this really was the eleventh year of the doc drama that keeps on ticking, Grey’s Anatomy. In one of the best episodes of the series, not just the season, this installment gave us glimpses of Meredith’s mixed up, complicated past with her mixed up, complicated mom, Ellis."

BuddyTV noted the show was "on a roll", praising the narrative structure, "In a superbly crafted episode, 'Only Mama Knows' explores the idea of memory, which is both notoriously unreliable and incredibly subjective." The review noted that Meredith gains a fuller understanding of the past and how it continues to affect her life, particularly with regard to Ellis and Richard's choices.

TVEquals also praised Pompeo and the overall pacing of the storyline, stating, "Last night’s episode of Grey’s Anatomy was entertaining and served as a useful reminder of how well-adjusted Meredith is, despite the challenges of her childhood." The site added, "The pacing of this storyline continues to be exceptional, and the actors have done a great job with the material." They also highlighted the strong performances of guest actors Kate Burton and Sally Pressman, noting Burton’s emotional impact as Ellis Grey in flashbacks.

HuffPost lauded Patrick Dempsey and Pompeo, particularly in their Derek-Meredith showdowns, writing, "Those Derek and Meredith showdowns! She tells him where to go, and finally stands up for herself, taking Cristina's 'be the sun' advice." The review also praised the construction of the episode, particularly its use of flashbacks and returning Burton to the storyline.

Fempop called the episode one of Grey's Anatomy's best, stating, "This episode doesn’t bluff. It’s holding at least three of a kind. Like some of the best episodes of the show, 'Only Mama Knows' is focused." They noted how the show minimized (Owen Hunt, Jackson Avery) or cut out unnecessary characters (Callie Torres, April Kepner) to focus on the central storyline involving Meredith, Richard and Maggie's complicated relationships.
