= I Must Have Lost it on the Wind =

- Grey's Anatomy episode
- Episode no.: Season 11; Episode 1
- Directed by: Kevin McKidd
- Written by: Stacy McKee
- Original air date: September 25, 2014
- Running time: 43 minutes

Guest appearances
- Geena Davis as Dr. Nicole Herman; Jason George as Dr. Ben Warren; Megan Gallagher as Mrs. Oldroyd; Sally Pressman as Young Ellis Grey; Kelly McCreary as Dr. Maggie Pierce; Christopher Redman as Chris; Matthew Van Oss as David Oldroyd; Libe Barer as Monica McKeever; Kate Burton as Ellis Grey

Episode chronology
← Previous "Fear (of the Unknown)"	Next → "Puzzle With a Piece Missing"
- Grey's Anatomy season 11

"I Must Have Lost it on the Wind" is the first episode and the season premiere of the eleventh season of the American television medical drama Grey's Anatomy, and the show's 221st episode overall. Written by Stacy McKee and directed by Kevin McKidd, the episode aired on the American Broadcasting Company (ABC) in the United States on September 25, 2014.

The episode centers on Meredith Grey (Ellen Pompeo) uncovering repressed memories about her half-sister Maggie Pierce (Kelly McCreary) while clashing with her in the OR. Callie Torres (Sara Ramirez) and Arizona (Jessica Capshaw) debate surrogacy, while Owen Hunt (Kevin McKidd) struggles with Cristina Yang's (Sandra Oh) absence. Alex Karev (Justin Chambers) and Miranda Bailey (Chandra Wilson) compete for Cristina's board seat, while Derek Shepherd (Patrick Dempsey) struggles with choosing between his family and his career plans in Washington, D.C.

The episode marks the first to not feature Oh as a series regular, and to feature McCreary and Scorsone as series regulars.

"I Must Have Lost it on the Wind" was watched by 9.81 million viewers, ranking #22 in overall viewership and #18 in the key 18–49 demographic, where it garnered a 3.1/11 Nielsen rating. It received mixed-to-positive reviews from television critics, with praise for Pompeo's performance.

== Plot ==
The episode opens with a voice-over narration from Meredith Grey (Ellen Pompeo) reflecting on the complexities of memory.

Meredith recalls a moment from the past, where Richard Webber (James Pickens Jr.) broke up with her mother, Ellis Grey (Kate Burton), at a carousel. Meredith remembers calling an ambulance after Ellis attempted suicide, with a doctor telling her that she saved her mother's life. However, Meredith's memories are revealed to be incomplete. In a flashback, Ellis is heard saying she doesn't want to see "her" after a baby's cry is heard. While Meredith believes it all happened on the same day, the scene shows her in a different dress outside the hospital, indicating her suppressed memory of Maggie Pierce's (Kelly McCreary) birth.

With Cristina Yang (Sandra Oh) no longer at Grey Sloan Memorial Hospital, Maggie steps in as the new Chief of Cardiothoracic Surgery. Meredith and Maggie clash in the operating room, with their opposing personalities leading to tension. Callie Torres (Sara Ramirez) and Arizona Robbins (Jessica Capshaw) debate the idea of using a surrogate. Initially, Callie is against it, but eventually changes her mind after realizing that not everything can be controlled. Arizona, on the other hand, wants to pause the surrogate discussion in order to pursue a fetal surgery fellowship, which means going back to school.

April Kepner (Sarah Drew) expresses concern about Owen Hunt (Kevin McKidd) being alone after Cristina's departure and tries to find him a new companion. Jackson Avery (Jesse Williams) offers to go for drinks, Richard suggests playing Jenga, and Derek Shepherd (Patrick Dempsey) invites him for a "man-date." Although Owen insists he is fine, his emotional state remains in question. Meanwhile, Alex Karev (Justin Chambers) and Miranda Bailey (Chandra Wilson) vie for Cristina's vacant position on the hospital board.

Meredith relies on Alex for comfort following the loss of her best friend, causing Jo Wilson (Camilla Luddington) to feel insecure. Derek eventually tells Meredith that he is choosing her and their children over his brain mapping initiative in Washington, D.C., signifying a shift in his priorities.

== Production ==
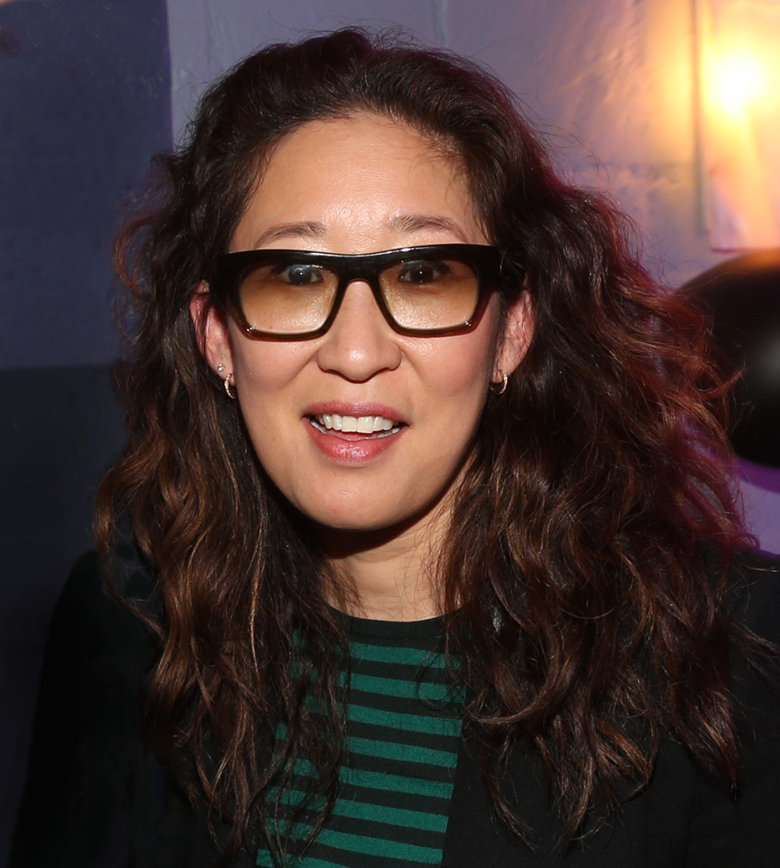
The premiere was the first episode to not feature Sandra Oh as a series regular post her departure in Season 10

On August 13, 2013, Sandra Oh announced that she would be departing Grey's Anatomy after Season 10. Consequently, this marks the first episode without Cristina Yang, portrayed by Oh, as part of the main cast.

Reflecting on Oh's exit, creator Shonda Rhimes expressed her mixed emotions: "I know Sandra pretty well. It was one of those things where I so wished it wasn't true... but I also know Sandra, and I know that it's time for her to have new challenges." Rhimes acknowledged the creative opportunities she enjoys as a writer but understood Oh's desire for something new.

In an interview with The Hollywood Reporter, Oh reflected on her character's journey, highlighting Ellen Pompeo’s (Meredith Grey) line, "I am not finished," as particularly meaningful. Oh explained, "That speech fills me now. That speech is about how she is not finished... I cannot tell you how much that line means to me".

== Release ==
"I Must Have Lost it on the Wind" was originally broadcast on September 25, 2014, in the United States on the American Broadcasting Company (ABC). The episode was watched by a total of 9.81 million, and scored a 3.1/11 in Nielsen ratings, It was ranked #22 in overall viewership and #18 in 18-49 demographics.

== Reception ==
"I Must Have Lost it on the Wind" received mixed-to-positive reviews from television critics, with praise for Pompeo's performance.

TV Fanatic praised the episode, stating, "The acting remains stellar, the drama is mixed with just the right amount of humor, and darn it if I'm not now wrapped up in the future of MerDer." Entertainment Weekly provided a more mixed-to-positive review, noting, "Overall, it wasn't a particularly memorable hour, but it was a good note on which to start a season. It was a way to show the fans that things can go back to normal even in a world without Yang. But considering that the show can't replace Yang with an outdoor windstorm every week, it'll be interesting to see where we go from here."

Addressing Cristina Yang's (Sandra Oh) exit, TV.com wrote, "So, the question I had heading into Grey's Anatomy's Season 11 premiere was just how much Cristina's absence would be felt. And at the end, I have to say—while the lack of Yang was definitely noticeable, I think the show will be just fine without her." CarterMatt singled out Pompeo as the standout of the episode, stating, "Pompeo's performance was great throughout this, and understated in much of the same way it often is. Her subtlety is probably why she is often overlooked. This was most present in the episode's final moment, as Derek Shepherd (Patrick Dempsey) turned down the Washington, D.C. job, which she clearly thinks he did just because she wanted him to."
