= Grey's Anatomy season 11 =

Grey's Anatomy
- Season 11
- DVD cover art for the eleventh season of Grey's Anatomy
- Showrunners: Shonda Rhimes; Stacy McKee; William Harper
- Starring: Ellen Pompeo; Justin Chambers; Chandra Wilson; James Pickens Jr.; Sara Ramirez; Kevin McKidd; Jessica Capshaw; Sarah Drew; Jesse Williams; Caterina Scorsone; Camilla Luddington; Jerrika Hinton; Kelly McCreary; Patrick Dempsey
- No. of episodes: 25

Release
- Original network: ABC
- Original release: September 25, 2014 – May 14, 2015

Season chronology
- ← Previous; Season 10 Next → Season 12

The eleventh season of the American television medical drama Grey's Anatomy premiered on September 25, 2014, in the United States on the American Broadcasting Company (ABC) and consists of 25 episodes. The season was produced by ABC Studios, in association with Shondaland Production Company and The Mark Gordon Company; the showrunners being Stacy McKee and William Harper. The season commenced airing with the episode "I Must Have Lost it on the Wind" and concluded with the season finale "You're My Home" airing on May 14, 2015. The season was officially released on DVD as a 6-disc boxset under the title of Grey's Anatomy: The Complete Eleventh Season – Life Changes on August 18, 2015, by Buena Vista Home Entertainment.

The season is the first in which Dr. Cristina Yang, portrayed by Sandra Oh, is not included in the main cast of characters following her departure in previous season's finale. The season's main storylines include Meredith Grey (Ellen Pompeo) dealing with "her person's" departure, her problematic love-life with her husband Derek Shepherd (Patrick Dempsey), and the arrival of Dr. Maggie Pierce (Kelly McCreary), whom Meredith learns is her half-sister. The biggest storyline of the season was the death of Derek who is involved in a car accident in "How to Save a Life". Other story-arcs include Amelia Shepherd (Caterina Scorsone) moving to Seattle, learning the ropes at Grey Sloan Memorial Hospital, Callie Torres (Sara Ramirez) and Arizona Robbins (Jessica Capshaw) try to save their marriage by going to marriage counseling, April Kepner (Sarah Drew) and Jackson Avery (Jesse Williams) end up having a boy, named Samuel, who dies moments after birth having been diagnosed to have osteogenesis imperfecta, a lethal birth defect. The season also focuses on the deepening friendship between Meredith and Alex Karev (Justin Chambers) causing problems for him and girlfriend Jo Wilson (Camilla Luddington).

The season ended with 11.08 million viewers ranking #36 overall in total viewers. This is much lower than the tenth season, which was ranked #15. In the 18–49 key demographic, Grey's Anatomy ranked #13 down 8 places from the previous season, which is the lowest ranking in the series' history. For the 2014–2015 Primetime TV schedule, it was the #5 drama in the 18–49 key demographic. The season was well received among television critics with several praising the writing and performances of the cast, with lead Ellen Pompeo's performance receiving high critical acclaim. In terms of awards and accolades the season garnered 6 nominations at the 41st People's Choice Awards winning 4 including Favorite Network TV Drama, Dempsey and Pompeo won Favorite Dramatic TV Actor and Actress respectively and Oh winning for Favorite TV Character We Miss Most. On May 7, 2015, ABC announced the renewal of Grey's Anatomy for a twelfth season as part of their 2015–16 TV lineup.

The website Screen Rant ranked the season #6 on their 2023 ranking of the 19 Grey's Anatomy seasons.

This season was the only season to feature all ten of the series' longest running characters: Meredith Grey, Miranda Bailey, Richard Webber (22 Seasons), Owen Hunt (18 Seasons), Alex Karev (16 Seasons), Jo Wilson (13 Seasons), Amelia Shepherd (12 Seasons), Jackson Avery, Derek Shepherd (11 Seasons), Callie Torres (10 Seasons)

== Episodes ==
The number in the "No. overall" column refers to the episode's number within the overall series, whereas the number in the "No. in season" column refers to the episode's number within this particular season. "U.S. viewers in millions" refers to the number of Americans in millions who watched the episodes live. Each episode of this season is named after a song.

| No. overall | No. in season | Title | Directed by | Written by | Original release date | Prod. code | U.S. viewers (millions) |
|---|---|---|---|---|---|---|---|
| 221 | 1 | "I Must Have Lost it on the Wind" | Kevin McKidd | Stacy McKee | September 25, 2014 | 1101 | 9.81 |
Maggie Pierce must step up to the plate as the new cardiothoracic surgeon after the departure of Cristina, and clashes with Meredith in the OR. Callie and Arizona debate over the use of a surrogate, with Callie being skeptical about it but later changes her mind. Arizona is given an opportunity from Dr. Herman to become a fetal surgery fellow, which she accepts. Alex and Bailey fight for Cristina's position on the board. Meanwhile, Richard, Jackson, and Derek try to distract Owen from Cristina's departure by inviting him to hang out. Jo becomes jealous after Meredith and Alex's relationship becomes closer after the departure of Cristina. After fighting over Meredith's decision, Derek tells Meredith that he chooses her and the kids over his brain mapping initiative in Washington, D.C.
| 222 | 2 | "Puzzle with a Piece Missing" | Rob Corn | William Harper | October 2, 2014 | 1102 | 9.15 |
Maggie tries to get used to Grey Sloan Memorial Hospital, and learns the difficulty of connecting with others. Jo, trying to win over Maggie, tells her about Alex's dilemma involving Dr. Oliver Lebackes' private practice and his seat on the board, which Maggie talks about during surgery with the two, which results in Alex being fired from the private practice. Maggie finds herself beginning a friendship with Amelia and finds out that Meredith is not so bad to know. She expresses interest in Bailey's genome mapping project, and she uses it and Cristina's research with the McNeil family to solve their family's case. After an extended argument, Callie decides that Arizona should do the fetal surgery fellowship and that they would work it out with having a second child. After her conversation with Amelia, Maggie tells Meredith that Ellis Grey is her mother, too. Meredith does not believe her and becomes furious with Maggie.
| 223 | 3 | "Got to Be Real" | Rob Corn | Zoanne Clack | October 9, 2014 | 1103 | 8.48 |
Owen takes Callie to a veteran's hospital with hopes of her using her lab to provide wounded veterans with robotic legs. However, damaged nerves in the veteran's legs becomes a problem, but Jackson manages to fix it. As Alex tries to prepare for his presentation to fill Cristina's position on the board, Meredith distracts him with the news of her new half-sister, Maggie. They discover that Maggie is indeed Meredith's half-sister. Derek and Amelia fight over being the Chief of Neurosurgery, which makes Derek second guess his decision to stay in Seattle. With the new fellowship and the wounded veterans project, Arizona and Callie doubt their future together. Richard attempts to tell Maggie that he is her father, but she reveals that she'd already known about it and is furious that he didn't tell her sooner. Alex and Bailey go head to head in front of the board for the open spot, with Bailey being given the seat.
| 224 | 4 | "Only Mama Knows" | Nicole Rubio | Mark Driscoll | October 16, 2014 | 1104 | 8.43 |
In a series of flashbacks, Meredith and Richard manage to come to terms with their past relationships with Ellis. Meredith goes searching through her mother's diaries and video footage in order to learn more about her half-sister. Alex learns that the board's vote was unanimously in favor of Bailey. When he confronts Arizona about it, she instead hires him as the new pediatrics attending so she can focus on the fetal surgery fellowship. Meredith and Derek's fight over D.C. subsides once Maggie tells Derek she is Meredith's half-sister. Bailey finds out from Richard who Maggie really is after learning why Maggie wants to leave the hospital. Meredith learns that the day at the carousel was the day Richard left Ellis for good, after being jealous of Ellis for the Harper Avery award. Meredith manages to remember Ellis' pregnancy and has a change of heart about Maggie. Absent: Sarah Drew as April Kepner.
| 225 | 5 | "Bend & Break" | Jesse Bochco | Meg Marinis | October 23, 2014 | 1105 | 8.62 |
Callie and Arizona find themselves in marriage counseling where the counselor suggests a 30-day separation with the rules of no talking or sexual activity. During their separation, Arizona is granted more time to focus on her fellowship and sharpen her fetal surgery skills; however, she messes up one too many times which upsets Dr. Herman. Alex also becomes angry at Arizona after going against his decision on a case. Meanwhile, Callie becomes closer to Meredith as they both are having marital problems. After a successful 30 day separation, Arizona expresses her love to Callie and says she needs her. Callie does not reciprocate and says that she felt free during the separation and needs more time to love herself. Absent: Chandra Wilson as Miranda Bailey
| 226 | 6 | "Don't Let's Start" | Rob Greenlea | Austin Guzman | November 6, 2014 | 1106 | 8.08 |
Jo becomes emotional after performing surgery on a homeless veteran that was living in her car, which makes her realize her progression with Alex. Bailey learns a lesson about her health after one of her patients dies from cancer to the esophagus after not taking good care of himself. April's mother, Karen, arrives in Seattle to help April and Jackson prepare the nursery for their baby, which creates tension with April but she later forgives her mother for the unwelcome surprise. Derek invites Maggie and Richard to dinner, despite Meredith's pleas to cancel. When they forget the time, Maggie and Richard have a conversation outside the house where Richard apologizes for his behavior. Arizona learns that Dr. Herman has an inoperable brain tumor, with only six months to live, and Dr. Herman wants to teach her a year of medicine in six months. Absent: Caterina Scorsone as Amelia Shepherd.
| 227 | 7 | "Could We Start Again, Please?" | Bobby Roth | Andy Reaser | November 13, 2014 | 1107 | 8.36 |
Amelia's secret about being a drug addict is revealed at the hospital when a patient's daughter, who knows about Amelia's past, demands another doctor once she finds out that Amelia is her surgeon. Amelia seeks comfort and advice from Richard. Owen asks Derek for help when Amelia refuses to discuss her past with him. Derek accidentally leads Owen to believe that Amelia is not sober, but Derek later tells the truth. He confesses to Amelia to have hit rock bottom after trying to do right by his wife, kids, and her. Arizona takes on a case without Dr. Herman, and is able to save the baby, but the mother dies on the table. Dr. Herman later shows up, admitting to have gotten a dose of radiation treatment. After assisting Arizona in surgery, April becomes more concerned about her own pregnancy. Bailey teaches Jo a lesson after Jo is unable to remember every step of her first solo surgery.
| 228 | 8 | "Risk" | Rob Corn | William Harper | November 20, 2014 | 1108 | 8.33 |
Arizona becomes more concerned about Dr. Herman after she begins to show symptoms during surgery. Arizona gets a hold of Dr. Herman's scans, which she shows to Amelia, who tells Arizona that she can save Dr. Herman's life. Callie and Owen's work with robotic limbs is paused after one of the patients hits his head during training and find himself in a coma. Stephanie detects a possible life-threatening birth defect for April and Jackson's baby on an ultrasound, which Dr. Herman later confirms. Derek is again offered the job in D.C. by the POTUS, and the situation intensifies his fight with Meredith. Meredith, tired of Derek's excuses for turning down the job, tells him to take the job which Derek does.
| 229 | 9 | "Where Do We Go From Here" | Debbie Allen | Meg Marinis | January 29, 2015 | 1109 | 8.71 |
Multiple car accidents caused by a woman with insulinoma brings patients to the ER. April and Jackson deal with the news that their unborn baby boy has osteogenesis imperfecta, a life threatening disease with little hope. Meredith must cope with the absence of Derek who took off to Washington, D.C., but Meredith and Derek decide that Derek should go through with his trip, and that they will make it work. Arizona and Amelia study Dr. Herman's tumor, and they come up with a game plan. At first, Dr. Herman is pessimistic and thinks there is no hope. However, she finally succumbs to Arizona's optimistic point-of-view and agrees to go forth with the surgery only once it becomes almost inoperable.
| 230 | 10 | "The Bed's Too Big Without You" | Chandra Wilson | Tia Napolitano | February 5, 2015 | 1110 | 7.98 |
Meredith feels more alone than ever after both Derek and Cristina have left her. Amelia begins to question her plan for removing Dr. Herman's tumor and begins to think that she will fail, but her hope restores after a talk with Richard. April and Jackson continue to struggle with their situation, with discussing what to do if their baby has Type II of osteogenesis imperfecta. Jackson wants an abortion if it is Type II, but it goes against April's Christian beliefs. Callie and Owen meet with a sales representative to discuss parts for their robotic limbs lab. Later at Joe's, Callie declines a one-night stand with the sale representative. Meredith, Maggie, and Bailey team up to perform surgery on a woman who has a difficult tumor in her abdomen, and they successfully remove the tumor after 3-D printing scans of it. Absent: Patrick Dempsey as Derek Shepherd
| 231 | 11 | "All I Could Do Was Cry" | Ron Underwood | Elizabeth J.B. Klaviter | February 12, 2015 | 1111 | 7.81 |
After receiving news about their baby having Type II osteogenesis imperfecta, April begins to doubt her beliefs in a just and loving God. Catherine Avery arrives at Grey Sloan Memorial to comfort her son and daughter-in-law and suggests that they set a date to induce labor, baptize him, and love him until God takes him. At first, April and Jackson go along with the idea, but later begin to have their doubts. Callie and Bailey help save the life of a woman who was accidentally shot by her husband and gives birth to a child she was unaware of. Maggie offers herself to babysit Meredith's kids so Meredith can visit Derek. Amelia continues to work with Stephanie on Dr. Herman's tumor case and test their plan on a patient with a similar tumor. April has a conversation with a woman who lost her fiancé in a car wreck, and after the conversation, April finds the strength to induce and have her son, whom she names Samuel Norbert Avery. Absent: Patrick Dempsey as Derek Shepherd
| 232 | 12 | "The Great Pretender" | Jeannot Szwarc | Mark Driscoll | February 19, 2015 | 1112 | 8.13 |
Meredith is evasive when asked about her weekend in Washington DC with Derek. Bailey goes with Ben and his brother to the woods to scatter their father's ashes, but the brother faints and falls. At the hospital Bailey and Meredith find out that Ben's brother is transitioning to be a woman, which upsets Ben. A patient pretends to faint in order to deflect a proposal by her boyfriend, but Callie tells the boyfriend the truth after the woman pretends to faint again at the hospital. Richard feels used by Catherine, Callie reenters the dating scene, and Owen and Amelia kiss for the first time. Maggie becomes suspicious of Meredith about her whereabouts over the weekend after she was called by Derek multiple times. Meredith tells Alex the truth that she stayed at a hotel alone for the entire weekend, just enjoying being alone. Absent: Patrick Dempsey as Derek Shepherd and Sarah Drew as April Kepner due to maternity leave.
| 233 | 13 | "Staring at the End" | Mark Jackson | Stacy McKee | February 26, 2015 | 1113 | 7.56 |
In the weeks leading up to Dr. Herman's surgery, Dr. Herman and Arizona attack the board of surgeries they have planned before she dies. Bailey has a special request, as the wife of her ex-patient is now pregnant with the baby having a tumor; however Dr. Herman declines. Amelia begins to lecture about her plan for removing Dr. Herman's tumor, with more and more doctors attending the conference. However, at the same time, Amelia begins to doubt herself, believing herself to not be better than Derek. After weeks of radiation therapy, Dr. Herman's tumor finally invades the optic chiasm, rendering her visually impaired, leading Amelia to schedule surgery for that day. Glenda Castillo, Bailey's patient, is sent to emergency surgery with Arizona prepping to operate her first solo fetal surgery. Absent: Patrick Dempsey as Derek Shepherd, Sarah Drew as April Kepner due to maternity leave, and Jesse Williams as Jackson Avery.
| 234 | 14 | "The Distance" | Eric Laneuville | Austin Guzman | March 5, 2015 | 1114 | 8.09 |
Dr. Herman's surgery begins, at the same time as Arizona and Bailey trying to save the life of Glenda Castillo. They have different opinions on how to proceed with the surgery, with Bailey wanting to deliver the baby while Arizona wants to keep the baby inside. At Dr. Herman's surgery, Amelia begs Richard to call Derek as she claims to be unable to continue. However, Richard comes up with encouraging advice, leading Amelia to proceed. Arizona, after some obstacles from Bailey, is able to save the patient and her baby. Amelia manages to remove the tumor, but after several days, Dr. Herman still does not wake up. Stephanie figures out that Dr. Herman had a small stroke, but luckily Dr. Herman eventually wakes up, but is completely blind. Amelia instructs Stephanie to live on the high and not beat herself up. Absent: Patrick Dempsey as Derek Shepherd
| 235 | 15 | "I Feel the Earth Move" | Thomas J. Wright | Jen Klein | March 12, 2015 | 1115 | 7.40 |
An earthquake strikes Seattle, sending a flood of patients to the ER. Owen must help an eleven-year-old girl after she calls the hospital for help for her mother who is barely breathing. Owen, Amelia, and Richard walk the girl through a procedure to help the mother. The young girl and her mother eventually make their way to the hospital with Amelia being able to save her. Meanwhile, Callie and Maggie treat an elderly, sexually-hyper woman. Maggie confides in Callie about her love life, and Callie suggests she should go out with the radiologist. Jackson and Ben work on a plastic surgery case, which allows Ben to talk about his sister's gender reassignment. Meredith learns from Jo that she is on a successful surgery streak ever since November, which is when Derek left. Meredith calls Derek to share her success, but begins to question Derek when another woman answers the phone. Absent: Patrick Dempsey as Derek Shepherd
| 236 | 16 | "Don't Dream It's Over" | Susan Vaill | Andy Reaser | March 19, 2015 | 1116 | 7.73 |
A patient with Alzheimer's is admitted to the hospital after having crashed into a house of a young pregnant couple, with the patient bringing memories to Richard regarding his late wife Adele. It is discovered that the man does not have Alzheimer's, but NPH, which caused his memory loss. Amelia offers to insert a shunt to prevent fluid from building up, but the patient declines, hoping to forget what he has done. The young mother suffers a massive intracranial hemorrhage, and dies on the OR table with the doctors being able to save the baby. Callie's new date leads Arizona to become jealous, but Arizona later reveals to Callie that the woman is a crazy ex-girlfriend. Richard tells Maggie about Ellis' fight with Alzheimer's; however, she reveals to already have been tested for the gene. April and Jackson struggle to move on with their life after the death of their baby. After not answering his phone all day, Derek shows up on Meredith's doorstep.
| 237 | 17 | "With or Without You" | Chandra Wilson | Elisabeth R. Finch | March 26, 2015 | 1117 | 8.18 |
With Derek back in town, Meredith tries to distract herself from the idea of her husband cheating on her. Alex asks for her opinion on one of his cases with Meredith suggesting a risky surgery. Owen's mother is admitted in the ER, and Owen learns about his mother's much younger boyfriend. This angers Owen, who then lashes out at Amelia. Later, however, Owen comes around and accepts his mother and her boyfriend's relationship. He then apologizes to Amelia, leading to them having sex. Jo's patient, admitted with nosebleeds, turns out to have a leech in her sinus cavities. Meredith's streak comes to an end when her and Alex's patient dies, and Alex comforts her. It is revealed that Derek did kiss his research fellow in Washington, D.C., but Derek proclaims his love for Meredith. Meredith confesses to having learned to live without Derek, but she confesses to not wanting to. Absent: Jessica Capshaw as Arizona Robbins
| 238 | 18 | "When I Grow Up" | Zetna Fuentes | Tia Napolitano | April 2, 2015 | 1118 | 6.64 |
A squad of police officers make their way to the hospital to support two of their own: brothers who were shot during the robbery. The suspect was a 15-year-old boy who is also undergoing surgery in need of a liver. It turns out that there's a match with one of the brothers he shot in the robbery. Meredith must discuss the process of organ donation with the mother of the two police officers who were killed, but before she can get the mother's permission, Bailey jumps in asking about the liver for the boy. The mother denies permission for organ donation when she learns who the boy is. Callie is working on the leg of the commanding officer who expresses concern for the young boy. Mistaken as wanting to get even, the officer tells Callie that the boy was a child they were able to get into foster care. With this new information, Meredith is able to convince the mother to save the suspect's life by allowing the liver transplant. Derek comes back to work under Amelia, who thinks he won't be able to work at the hospital without trying to steal surgeries from her. Eventually, Amelia realizes that her brother is being sincere and is happy to be back home with his family and his job as her fellow. With prodding from Jo, Stephanie falls for one of the chaperones on the field trip, but to her surprise, the guy is a high school student. Callie gets asked out by the commanding officer, but indirectly declines without explanation. Amelia confides in Derek that she is falling in love with Owen.
| 239 | 19 | "Crazy Love" | Paul McCrane | Elizabeth J.B. Klaviter | April 9, 2015 | 1119 | 7.42 |
A local chef has his penis cut off by his wife when she finds out that he was having an affair. April calls Catherine Avery for a consult about the chef, and Catherine becomes impressed with Stephanie for her quick thinking about the preservation of the penis, suggesting urology as a specialty. Amelia and Callie disagree on the approach for a surgery for a misaligned spine, leading Owen to weigh in on Amelia's approach. However, in surgery, Amelia's approach goes wrong leading Amelia to blame Owen for interfering. The woman the local chef had an affair with, cuts off the chef's penis again, but Stephanie manages to get the penis back and decides to not specialize in urology. Richard and Catherine proclaim their love for each other after having an argument over their careers. Derek leaves for D.C. to wrap things up, but Meredith gets a call from the White House saying Derek never showed up for the meeting.
| 240 | 20 | "One Flight Down" | David Greenspan | Austin Guzman | April 16, 2015 | 1120 | 7.60 |
A plane crash in Seattle brings old memories back to Meredith, Arizona, and Owen. After learning that Derek never showed up in D.C., Meredith begins to worry; however Bailey gives her a 5:00 p.m. time frame for freaking out. With the plane crash situation, Alex tries to make sure Arizona is okay, but he only begins to annoy her instead. Alex admits to Arizona that it was him instead of Callie who cut off her leg, with Callie admitting to Arizona that she wanted her to have Alex and just be mad at her. Amelia learns about Owen's involvement in the plane crash. Maggie learns from April and Alex about the plane crash that killed Lexie, while Stephanie tries her hardest to make her patient remember the pilot with whom she fell in love. Just when Meredith is about to call Derek at 5.00 p.m., a police car pulls up in her driveway. Absent: Jesse Williams as Jackson Avery.
| 241 | 21 | "How to Save a Life" | Rob Hardy | Shonda Rhimes | April 23, 2015 | 1121 | 9.55 |
On his way to the airport, Derek witnesses a car crash, leading him to try and help. He manages to help a girl with an exposed abdomen and a boy who has suffered a massive head trauma. Derek manages to alert help from the smoke of the car explosion. Just as Derek is about to drive away, he is hit by a semi-truck, and is rushed to the ER at the closest hospital. He is unable to speak as the doctors examine him, with him subconsciously telling the doctors to order a head CT. However, Derek is rushed into surgery, but by the time the doctors discover his blown pupil, the neurosurgeon arrives too late and Derek is declared brain-dead. After several hours, Meredith signs the papers to turn off life-support. She confronts one of the doctors, Penny, and advises her to learn from her mistake. Right before the nurse turns off the life-support, Meredith remembers her life with Derek and tells him she will be fine, and Derek takes his final breath. Absent: Justin Chambers as Alex Karev, Jessica Capshaw as Arizona Robbins, Jesse Williams as Jackson Avery, Camilla Luddington as Jo Wilson, Jerrika Hinton as Stephanie Edwards, and Kelly McCreary as Maggie Pierce.
| 242 | 22 | "She's Leaving Home" | Chris Hayden | Stacy McKee | April 30, 2015 | 1122 | 8.74 |
| 243 | 23 | "She's Leaving Home" | Chris Hayden | Stacy McKee | April 30, 2015 | 1123 | 8.74 |
Meredith reveals the news of Derek's death at the hospital, with everyone taking it hard except Amelia, who hides behind morbid jokes about her brother being dead. After the funeral, Meredith goes AWOL after leaving a note. Bailey and Ben discuss their different opinions about extraordinary measures if anything happens to them. Dan, Callie's chief of police one-time date, is admitted to the hospital after an accident. Owen and April go overseas for a planned three-month military surgical training program, but April keeps extending her leave despite Jackson's pleas for her to come home. Jackson and Jo work on a pair of burn victims who bond over their circumstances. After almost a year, Alex receives a call from Meredith saying that she and the kids are fine. It is revealed that Meredith is very pregnant with Derek's baby. Catherine rejects Richard's proposal before he can even ask her. Callie continues to work with Dan after she had to amputate his leg, and remembers when she and Derek created the robotic limbs. After not letting Derek's death affect her, Amelia has an emotional breakdown at the hospital, leading her to buy drugs. At Meredith and Derek's house, Owen manages to convince Amelia to not take the drugs, which leads Amelia to confront her feelings about Derek's death. On Valentine's Day, Ben reveals to Bailey about wanting to be unplugged like Bailey, but Bailey, now accepting Ben's wish to live at all costs, is disappointed with his decision. April returns from her military leave which happily surprises Jackson, and Catherine comes around and proposes to Richard, who happily accepts. Meredith begins to bleed from her uterus and Zola calls 911 saving Meredith's life, paralleling when Meredith saved Ellis' life. Meredith gives birth to a baby girl named Ellis, and Alex shows up to support her as he was her emergency contact person. Meredith finally returns to Seattle and decides to start over. Absent: Patrick Dempsey as Derek Shepherd.
| 244 | 24 | "Time Stops" | Kevin McKidd | Meg Marinis | May 7, 2015 | 1124 | 7.74 |
A collapse of a tunnel sends multiple victims to the hospital, and April, Maggie, Amelia, and Meredith are sent to the site to help rescue others. Richard, serving as interim Chief of Surgery since Owen resigned, gives his first-day speech to the new interns on the same day as his and Catherine's wedding day. However, Richard calls off the wedding after several fights between them. Amelia confronts Meredith about her decision to unplug Derek before consulting with her. Callie and Arizona work on Joan, a patient who goes into labor after the tunnel collapse, but one of the new interns loosens her collar, leading the neck to dislocate. Meredith asks Alex if she and the kids can move back in with him and Jo, Alex allows her to do so, but Meredith suggests that Alex should first ask Jo about that. However, Alex and Jo hit a rough spot due to Jo's wishes to join the army, so he tells Meredith that it won't be necesarry to ask her. Jackson struggles with the new changed April, and Maggie receives bad news from her mom. April brings one of the trapped patients, still in his car, to the hospital. Absent: Patrick Dempsey as Derek Shepherd
| 245 | 25 | "You're My Home" | Rob Corn | William Harper | May 14, 2015 | 1125 | 8.33 |
With only five minutes to get April's patient out of the car to the operating table, Stephanie's interns must help make a clear path. Alex asks Jo about Meredith and kids moving in, which Jo misunderstands, leading her to buy a fixer-upper apartment for her and Alex. Meredith tries to mend her relationship with Amelia by giving her Derek's last voicemail. Richard promises Bailey that she will be the next Chief of Surgery, but Catherine disagrees, leading them to argue about their careers. After Meredith tells them to work out their problems, they agree to each have one candidate for Chief of Surgery which the board will ultimately choose. Richard and Catherine get married and have their reception at Meredith and Derek's house. April tells Jackson about wanting to go to Jordan again, but he gives her an ultimatum about their marriage. Maggie consults Meredith about her parents' divorce, and Meredith suggests that they "dance-it-out".

== Cast and characters ==
=== Main ===
- Ellen Pompeo as Dr. Meredith Grey
- Justin Chambers as Dr. Alex Karev
- Chandra Wilson as Dr. Miranda Bailey
- James Pickens Jr. as Dr. Richard Webber
- Sara Ramirez as Dr. Callie Torres
- Kevin McKidd as Dr. Owen Hunt
- Jessica Capshaw as Dr. Arizona Robbins
- Sarah Drew as Dr. April Kepner
- Jesse Williams as Dr. Jackson Avery
- Caterina Scorsone as Dr. Amelia Shepherd
- Camilla Luddington as Dr. Jo Wilson
- Jerrika Hinton as Dr. Stephanie Edwards
- Kelly McCreary as Dr. Maggie Pierce
- Patrick Dempsey as Dr. Derek Shepherd

=== Recurring ===
- Jason George as Dr. Ben Warren
- Giacomo Gianniotti as Dr. Andrew DeLuca
- Geena Davis as Dr. Nicole Herman
- Debbie Allen as Dr. Catherine Avery
- Kate Burton as Dr. Ellis Grey
- Nicholas D'Agosto as Dr. Graham Maddox
- Sally Pressman as Young Ellis Grey
- Aria Leabu as Young Meredith Grey
- Connie Ray as Karen Kepner
- Kevin Alejandro as Dan Pruitt
- Nicole Cummins as Paramedic Nicole
- Heather Matarazzo as Joan Paulson
- Joe Adler as Dr. Isaac Cross
- Irene Keng as Dr. Audrey Shaw
- Joe Dinicol as Dr. Mitchell Spencer
- Samantha Sloyan as Dr. Penelope Blake

=== Notable guests ===
- J. August Richards as Young Richard Webber
- Patrick Fabian as Dr. Oliver Lebackes
- Rebecca Field as Sabine McNeil
- Debra Mooney as Evelyn Hunt
- Billy Malone as Jon McNeil
- Annet Mahendru as Ana
- Kiralee Hayashi as Tracey Mitchell
- Chad James Buchanan as Brian
- Taylor John Smith as Nick
- Ajiona Alexus as Marissa McKay
- Sydney Sweeney as Erin Weaver
- Nicole Sullivan as JJ
- Elizabeth Ann Bennett as Ann
- Millie Bobby Brown as Ruby

== Production ==
=== Development ===
Grey's Anatomy was renewed for an eleventh season by ABC on May 8, 2014. On May 13, 2014, ABC announced their new schedule, as well as a new timeslot for Grey's Anatomy. The show remained on Thursday night, but it was moved to 8:00 PM E.T. to make room for ShondaLand Production Company's new TV series, How to Get Away with Murder. Even though Paul Lee, the president of ABC, moved Grey's Anatomy to a new timeslot, he announced at ABC's 2014-15 upfront that the eleventh season would air in the same order as the previous season with 2 batches consisting of 12 interrupted episodes.

For the 2014–15 TV season, ABC programmed its entire Thursday primetime lineup with Shondaland dramas Grey's Anatomy, Scandal and How To Get Away With Murder, then branded the night as "Thank God It's Thursday" (or "TGIT"). This echoes ABC's former TGIF branding of its Friday night family sitcoms and even NBC's Must See TV promotion of formidable Thursday night television hits in the 1990s.

The remaining fall schedule for ABC was announced on October 30, 2014, where it was announced that Grey's Anatomy would be split into 2 batches. However, instead of the 12 and 12, there will be 8 episodes in the fall which will end with a winter finale on November 20, 2014, like the rest of ABC's primetime lineup "TGIT" Scandal and How To Get Away with Murder. The remaining 16 episodes will air after the winter break, beginning on January 29, 2015.

=== Writing ===
During an interview, Shonda Rhimes stated that "Season 11 is really a Meredith-centric season. She lost her 'person', her half-sister has shown up, her husband is chafing to go someplace else..." She went on to reveal that she's been wanting to do the "familial grenade" storyline for a long time, and at the end of Season 10, she knew it was the time to do it. Rhimes also claimed that Season 11 will pick up right where Season 10 left us, so there won't be much that the audience won't see. In another interview, Rhimes revealed that she and the writers were thinking about doing flashback periods to the younger days of Dr. Ellis Grey and Dr. Richard Webber. Sarah Drew's character Dr. April Kepner became pregnant at the end of the tenth season, which coincided with Drew's real-life pregnancy.

=== Casting ===
On August 13, 2013, Sandra Oh revealed that she would be leaving after Season 10 of Grey's Anatomy, making the eleventh season the first season in which Dr. Cristina Yang did not appear. It was announced on March 25, 2014, that Gaius Charles and Tessa Ferrer did not receive a contract renewal for the eleventh season, and left at the end of the tenth season. Jerrika Hinton and Camilla Luddington however, returned as residents for the eleventh season. On January 23, 2014, it was reported that Ellen Pompeo and Patrick Dempsey had renewed their contracts for another 3 seasons, as Meredith Grey and Derek Shepherd, respectively, meaning their characters would be staying on the medical drama for seasons 11 and 12. On May 2, 2014, the rest of the 6 original cast mates, Justin Chambers, Chandra Wilson and James Pickens Jr., excluding Sandra Oh, renewed their contracts for another 2 seasons (11 and 12) as Drs. Alex Karev, Miranda Bailey, and Richard Webber, respectively. Sara Ramirez also renewed her contract for another 2 seasons as Dr. Callie Torres.

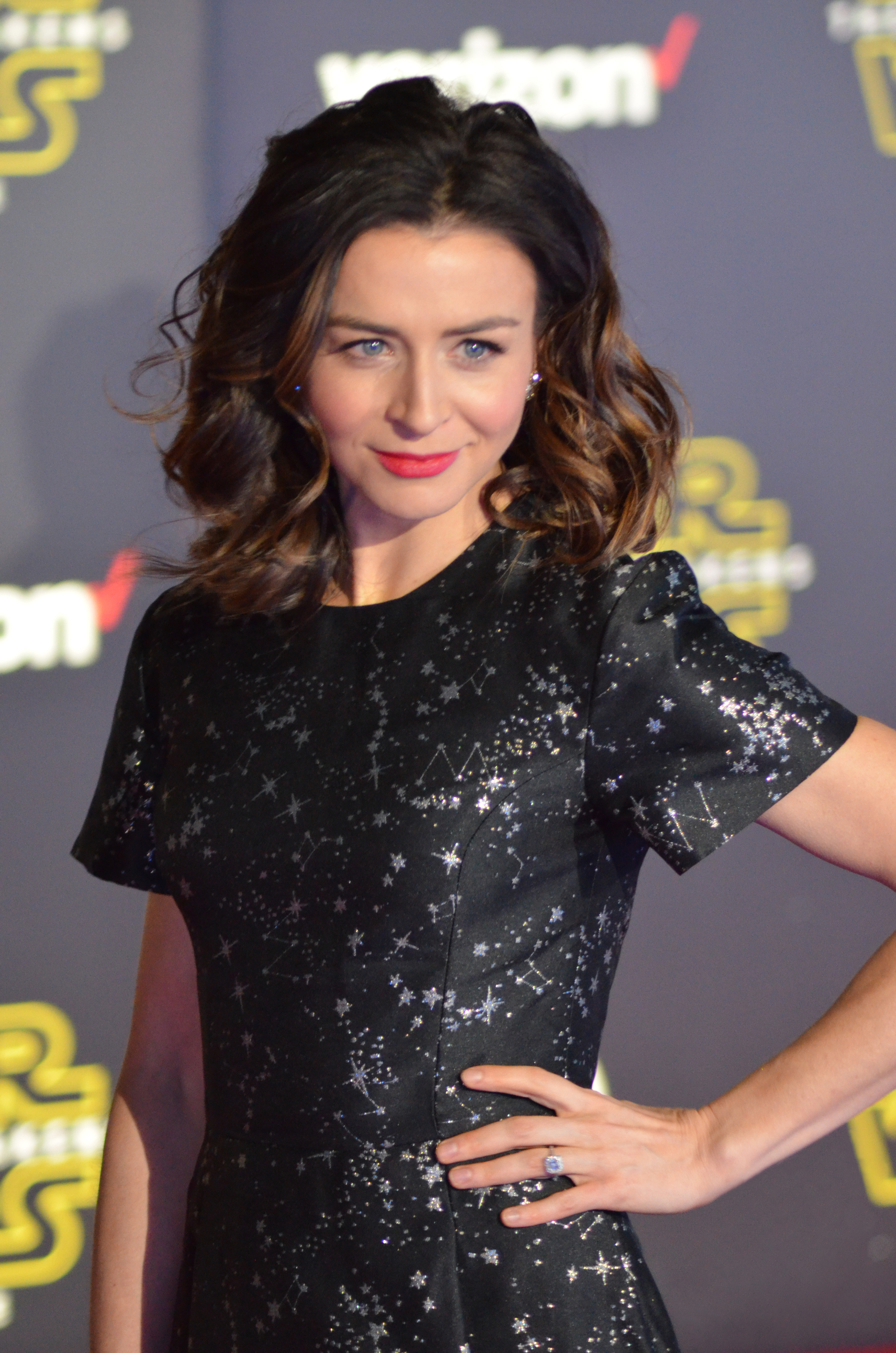
Caterina Scorsone was upgraded to a series regular and quickly became a fan and critics favorite.

E! News reported on June 23, 2014, that Caterina Scorsone was upgraded to a series-regular to continue her role as Dr. Amelia Shepherd, one of Dr. Derek Shepherd's 4 sisters. Scorsone had played the character since the seventh season as a recurring role, and played the character as a series-regular on the show's spin-off series, Private Practice. After speculations about who would portray the character Ellis Grey, either Kate Burton or Sarah Paulson, it was announced that Sally Pressman would replace Paulson as Ellis in flashbacks with J. August Richards reprising his role as a young Richard Webber in the same episode. On August 6, 2014, it was confirmed that Burton would return to portray Ellis in flashbacks.

Geena Davis was announced to appear in the season and would have a major guest arc as Dr. Nicole Herman, a fetal surgeon at Grey Sloan Memorial Hospital. On September 2, 2014, Annet Mahendru of The Americans was announced to guest star for 1 episode, and she played Ana, an undocumented immigrant whose daughter had an 8-pound tumor. It was announced on September 23, 2014, that Connie Ray, known from Space Jam and Stuart Little, would guest star as Dr. April Kepner's mother, Karen, and would appear in the sixth episode. On October 23, 2014, Kelly McCreary was promoted to a series-regular after being credited as guest-starring until the eleventh episode. On April 15, 2015, Reign alum Giacomo Gianniotti was announced to be cast on the show as a possible recurring role for Season 12. On April 28, 2015, it was announced that Joe Adler was cast for the show, and would appear in the final 2 episodes of the season.

Despite signing on for 2 more years after the tenth season, Patrick Dempsey decided that the eleventh season would be his last. The announcement was made on April 23, 2015, just a few hours before his final episode, "How to Save a Life", premiered. Showrunner Shonda Rhimes spoke out about the departure as she said "Derek Shepherd is and will always be an incredibly important character—for Meredith, for me and for the fans. I absolutely never imagined saying goodbye to our 'McDreamy.'"

=== Filming ===
Not even a week after the Season 10 finale episode aired, the Grey's Anatomy team of writers began collaborating on ideas for Season 11 storylines. Shonda Rhimes tweeted that they were hard at work in the writing room, but would have the month of June off before coming back in full swing to write actual episodes. After the 4th of July weekend, Rhimes tweeted that the writers' room was once again buzzing, as the team had returned from vacation to start writing new episodes for Season 11. Camilla Luddington confirmed that the filming for the eleventh season would begin on July 25, 2014.

== Reception ==
=== Ratings ===
Grey's Anatomy's eleventh season opened up to 10.14 million viewers with a 3.1/11 Nielsen rating/share in the 18–49 demographic. The premiere episode "I Must Have Lost it on the Wind", was the season's most-viewed episode. "When I Grow Up" was the season and series' least-viewed episode, with 6.64 million viewers and a 1.9/7 Nielsen rating/share in the 18–49 demographic. The season finale was the series lowest-watched season finale with 8.33 million viewers and 2.2/8 in the 18–49 rating demo.

Grey's Anatomy, in its eleventh season, ranked #36 overall in total viewers (11.08 million). This is much lower than Season 10, which was ranked #15. In the 18–49 key demographic, Grey's Anatomy ranked #13 (the lowest ranking in the series' history). The highest ranking for the 18–49 key demographic was #3 for seasons 3, 4, and 5. Last season, Grey's Anatomy was ranked #5. For the 2014–2015 primetime TV schedule, Grey's Anatomy was the #1 drama in the 18–49 key demographic.

==== Live + SD ratings ====
| No. in series | No. in season | Episode | Air date | Time slot (EST) | Rating/Share (18–49) | Viewers (m) | 18–49 Rank | Viewership rank | Drama rank |
|---|---|---|---|---|---|---|---|---|---|
| 221 | 1 | "I Must Have Lost It on the Wind" | September 25, 2014 | Thursdays; 8:00 p.m. | 3.1/11 | 9.81 | 18 | 22 | 7 |
| 222 | 2 | "Puzzle With a Piece Missing" | October 2, 2014 | Thursdays; 8:00 p.m. | 2.6/9 | 9.15 | 16 | —N/a | 8 |
| 223 | 3 | "Got to Be Real" | October 9, 2014 | Thursdays; 8:00 p.m. | 2.4/8 | 8.48 | 20 | —N/a | 9 |
| 224 | 4 | "Only Mama Knows" | October 16, 2014 | Thursdays; 8:00 p.m. | 2.4/8 | 8.43 | 22 | —N/a | 8 |
| 225 | 5 | "Bend & Break" | October 23, 2014 | Thursdays; 8:00 p.m. | 2.5/8 | 8.62 | 16 | —N/a | 4 |
| 226 | 6 | "Don't Let's Start" | November 6, 2014 | Thursdays; 8:00 p.m. | 2.4/7 | 8.08 | 13 | —N/a | 5 |
| 227 | 7 | "Could We Start Again, Please?" | November 13, 2014 | Thursdays; 8:00 p.m. | 2.4/7 | 8.36 | 18 | —N/a | 5 |
| 228 | 8 | "Risk" | November 20, 2014 | Thursdays; 8:00 p.m. | 2.4/7 | 8.33 | 15 | —N/a | 5 |
| 229 | 9 | "Where Do We Go From Here" | January 29, 2015 | Thursdays; 8:00 p.m. | 2.8/9 | 8.71 | 10 | 20 | 5 |
| 230 | 10 | "The Bed's Too Big Without You" | February 5, 2015 | Thursdays; 8:00 p.m. | 2.3/7 | 7.98 | 16 | —N/a | 6 |
| 231 | 11 | "All I Could Do Was Cry" | February 12, 2015 | Thursdays; 8:00 p.m. | 2.3/8 | 7.81 | 14 | —N/a | 7 |
| 232 | 12 | "The Great Pretender" | February 19, 2015 | Thursdays; 8:00 p.m. | 2.5/8 | 8.13 | 15 | —N/a | 5 |
| 233 | 13 | "Staring at the End" | February 26, 2015 | Thursdays; 8:00 p.m. | 2.2/7 | 7.56 | 17 | —N/a | 5 |
| 234 | 14 | "The Distance" | March 5, 2015 | Thursdays; 8:00 p.m. | 2.4/8 | 8.09 | 11 | —N/a | 3 |
| 235 | 15 | "I Feel the Earth Move" | March 12, 2015 | Thursdays; 8:00 p.m. | 2.1/7 | 7.40 | 18 | —N/a | 6 |
| 236 | 16 | "Dont Dream It's Over" | March 19, 2015 | Thursdays; 8:00 p.m. | 2.1/7 | 7.73 | 8 | 19 | 3 |
| 237 | 17 | "With or Without You" | March 26, 2015 | Thursdays; 8:00 p.m. | 2.2/9 | 8.18 | 10 | 16 | 3 |
| 238 | 18 | "When I Grow Up" | April 2, 2015 | Thursdays; 8:00 p.m. | 1.9/7 | 6.64 | 15 | 32 | 5 |
| 239 | 19 | "Crazy Love" | April 9, 2015 | Thursday 9:00 p.m. | 2.1/7 | 7.42 | 11 | 24 | 3 |
| 240 | 20 | "One Flight Down" | April 16, 2015 | Thursdays 8:00 p.m. | 2.1/8 | 7.60 | 12 | 20 | 3 |
| 241 | 21 | "How to Save a Life" | April 23, 2015 | Thursdays 8:00 p.m. | 2.8/10 | 9.55 | 4 | 14 | 1 |
| 242 | 22 | "She's Leaving Home (Part 1)" | April 30, 2015 | Thursdays 8:00 p.m. | 2.6/9 | 8.74 | 4 | 14 | 1 |
| 243 | 23 | "She's Leaving Home (Part 2)" | April 30, 2015 | Thursday 9:00 p.m. | 2.6/9 | 8.74 | 4 | 14 | 1 |
| 244 | 24 | "Time Stops" | May 7, 2015 | Thursdays 8:00 p.m. | 2.1/8 | 7.74 | 7 | 20 | 2 |
| 245 | 25 | "You're My Home" | May 14, 2015 | Thursdays 8:00 p.m. | 2.2/8 | 8.33 | 7 | 13 | 2 |

==== Live + 7 Day (DVR) ratings ====
| No. in series | No. in season | Episode | Air date | Time slot (EST) | 18–49 rating increase | Viewers (millions) increase | Total 18-49 | Total viewers (millions) | Ref |
|---|---|---|---|---|---|---|---|---|---|
| 221 | 1 | "I Must Have Lost on the Wind" | September 25, 2014 | Thursdays; 8:00 p.m. | 1.5 | 3.61 | 4.6 | 13.42 | |
| 222 | 2 | "Puzzle With a Piece Missing" | October 2, 2014 | Thursdays; 8:00 p.m. | 1.4 | 3.32 | 4.0 | 12.47 | |
| 223 | 3 | "Got to Be Real" | October 9, 2014 | Thursdays; 8:00 p.m. | 1.6 | 3.45 | 4.0 | 11.93 | |
| 224 | 4 | "Only Mama Knows" | October 16, 2014 | Thursdays; 8:00 p.m. | 1.6 | 3.48 | 4.0 | 11.91 | |
| 225 | 5 | "Bend & Break" | October 23, 2014 | Thursdays; 8:00 p.m. | 1.4 | 3.23 | 3.9 | 11.85 | |
| 226 | 6 | "Don't Let's Start" | November 6, 2014 | Thursdays; 8:00 p.m. | 1.7 | 3.73 | 4.1 | 11.81 | |
| 227 | 7 | "Could We Start Again, Please?" | November 13, 2014 | Thursdays; 8:00 p.m. | 1.5 | 3.50 | 3.9 | 11.86 | |
| 228 | 8 | "Risk" | November 20, 2014 | Thursdays; 8:00 p.m. | 1.3 | 3.14 | 3.7 | 11.47 | |
| 229 | 9 | "Where Do We Go From Here" | January 29, 2015 | Thursdays; 8:00 p.m. | 1.5 | 3.68 | 4.3 | 12.39 | |
| 230 | 10 | "The Bed's Too Big Without You" | February 5, 2015 | Thursdays; 8:00 p.m. | 1.5 | 3.28 | 3.8 | 11.26 | |
| 231 | 11 | "All I Could Do Was Cry" | February 12, 2015 | Thursdays; 8:00 p.m. | 1.5 | 3.47 | 3.8 | 11.28 | |
| 232 | 12 | "The Great Pretender" | February 19, 2015 | Thursdays; 8:00 p.m. | 1.6 | 3.60 | 4.1 | 11.73 | |
| 233 | 13 | "Staring at the End" | February 26, 2015 | Thursdays; 8:00 p.m. | 1.4 | 3.21 | 3.6 | 10.77 | |
| 234 | 14 | "The Distance" | March 5, 2015 | Thursdays; 8:00 p.m. | 1.3 | 3.02 | 3.7 | 11.11 | |
| 235 | 15 | "I Feel the Earth Move" | March 12, 2015 | Thursdays; 8:00 p.m. | 1.5 | 3.25 | 3.6 | 10.65 | |
| 236 | 16 | "Don't Dream It's Over" | March 19, 2015 | Thursdays; 8:00 p.m. | 1.4 | 3.30 | 3.5 | 11.03 | |
| 237 | 17 | "With or Without You" | March 26, 2015 | Thursdays; 8:00 p.m. | 1.6 | 3.27 | 3.8 | 11.45 | |
| 238 | 18 | "When I Grow Up" | April 2, 2015 | Thursdays; 8:00 p.m. | 1.5 | 3.41 | 3.4 | 10.05 | |
| 239 | 19 | "Crazy Love" | April 9, 2015 | Thursday 9:00 p.m. | —N/a | —N/a | —N/a | —N/a | |
| 240 | 20 | "One Flight Down" | April 16, 2015 | Thursdays 8:00 p.m. | 1.4 | 3.09 | 3.5 | 10.69 | |
| 241 | 21 | "How to Save a Life" | April 23, 2015 | Thursdays 8:00 p.m. | 1.6 | 3.65 | 4.4 | 13.20 | |
| 242 | 22 | "She's Leaving Home (Part 1)" | April 30, 2015 | Thursdays 8:00 p.m. | 1.4 | 3.14 | 4.0 | 11.88 | |
| 243 | 23 | "She's Leaving Home (Part 2)" | April 30, 2015 | Thursday 9:00 p.m. | 1.4 | 3.14 | 4.0 | 11.88 | |
| 244 | 24 | "Time Stops" | May 7, 2015 | Thursdays 8:00 p.m. | 1.5 | 3.37 | 3.6 | 11.11 | |
| 245 | 25 | "You're My Home" | May 14, 2015 | Thursdays 8:00 p.m. | 1.4 | 3.09 | 3.6 | 11.43 | |

=== Critical response ===
The first half of the season opened to critical acclaim with many calling it the best season in the past few years, the second-half, however, garnered mixed reviews. With Season 11 being the first in Grey's Anatomy history to be without Cristina Yang, TV.com wrote, "So, the question I had heading into Grey's Anatomy's Season 11 premiere was just how much Cristina's absence would be felt. And at the end, I have to say-while the lack of Yang was definitely noticeable, I think the show will be just fine with out her."

Perhaps the biggest storyline of Season 11 was the death of Derek Shepherd. After his last episode, "How to Save a Life" premiered, many fans were outraged with Shonda Rhimes for how the episode was written and vowed to never watch the show again. Samantha Highfill of Entertainment Weekly wrote: "Of all the ways he could've gone—dying while saving that family in a shocking but heroic moment, or dying at Grey Sloan and getting a chance to say goodbye to everyone—this felt cheap. And quite frankly, it felt a little rude to the man himself. He was called McDreamy for a reason, and he deserved better than this." Citing the storylines of Derek's death, Callie and Arizona splitting up, and April and Jackson losing their baby, The Hollywood Reporter wrote that Season 11 is one of the most depressing seasons of Grey's Anatomy.

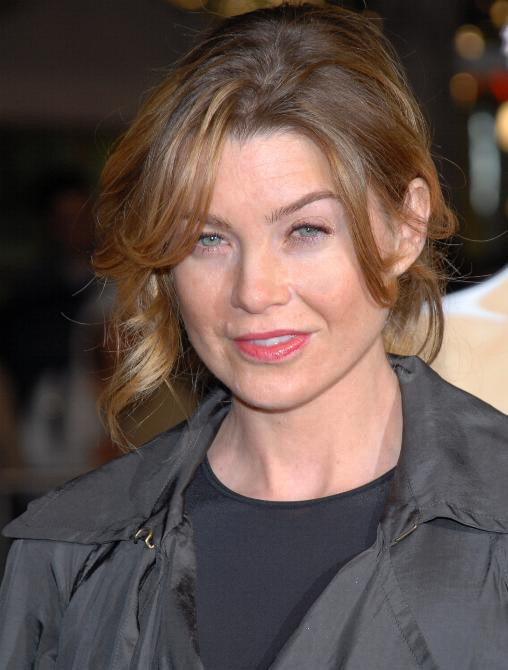
Ellen Pompeo garnered high critical acclaim more so towards the latter-half of the season for her portrayal of Meredith Grey.

Despite all that, the season garnered positive reviews. Entertainment Weekly wrote, "It's nice to see Grey's pull back on the throttle on its soap opera tendencies (and I hate using that word as pejorative) and aim for drama that feels a bit more grounded." TV Fanatic gave a hugely positive review stating, "The acting remains stellar, the drama is mixed with just the right amount of humor and darn it if I'm not now wrapped up in the future of MerDer." TV Equals stated that, "This season certainly had its strong points, the sad loss of April and Jackson's son was a tearjerker in all the right ways. It was great to see Amelia move past an uncomfortable incident with someone from her past and go on to save Dr. Herman's life. Maggie Pierce was a great addition to the show and the writers managed to revisit this premise in a way that felt fresh. The storyline was also well-paced and it's been great to watch Maggie become a larger part of Meredith's life and to watch her get fully integrated into Grey Sloan."

BuddyTV gave the finale a positive review, "'You're My Home' proved to be so bright and shiny. This is an episode that nearly could have served as a series finale, though we know that is not the case. Indeed, a few characters notwithstanding, most of our beloved surgeons are in a shockingly good place as season 11 draws to a close." adding, "I was very impressed tonight as Meredith, who can be very selfish but - in fairness - has suffered great personal loss in the death of Derek, stepped up to the plate on behalf of others. When one considers how this character has grown over 11 seasons, it really is amazing. Kudos to Ellen Pompeo for her fine work. She's actually done the impossible, because I actually care what happens to Meredith Grey in season 12." The episode "Only Mama Knows" received high critical acclaim with numerous critics calling it "one of the best of Grey's". Spoilertv lauded the episode and wrote, "Outstanding! It's been a very long time since an episode came along which truly lived and breathed the very core of Grey's Anatomy. It was faithfully and beautifully written, directed, edited and acted." Entertainment Weekly called the show a "great drama series" stating, "It was also throwing us back to the type of episode we expected from this show in the early seasons, the type of episode that gave you chills and reminded you why this show is so good at drama."

Ellen Pompeo garnered high critical acclaim towards the latter-half of the season for her portrayal of Meredith Grey. Rick Porter of Zap2it lauded Pompeo's performance in "How to Save a Life", may not be the ideal Emmy-submission episode for Ellen Pompeo, considering Meredith is off-screen for more than half of it. But it's among the best work she's ever done on the show." USA Today also lauded Pompeo's performance saying, " In some ways, the episode was even more of a showcase for Pompeo. She didn't play a prominent part until late in the hour, but she had some of the more memorable and well-played scenes, from her angry response to the doctor who tries to tell her what her choices are, to her resignation when she realizes she has to comfort and motivate the young doctor whose mistakes cost Derek his life." Reviewing the episode "She's Leaving Home", Matt Carter commended on the show's "shocking" longevity and that it "is still in a position where it makes sense." He also praised Pompeo's performance as "great throughout" and "overlooked".

== DVD release ==
Grey's Anatomy: The Complete Eleventh Season – Life Changes
| Set Details | | Special Features |
| 24 Episodes (1 double-length episode) (1 extended episode); 6-Disc Set; English (Dolby Digital 5.1 Surround); Subtitles: English SDH, Spanish & French; Runtime: 1077 minutes | | Extended Finale - "You're My Home"; Spotlight Cast Piece: Caterina Scorsone; How To Say Goodbye: Dr. Derek Shepherd; Deleted Scenes; In Stitches: Season 11 Outtakes |
Release Dates
| Region 1 | Region 2 | Region 4 |
| August 18, 2015 | October 5, 2015 | October 7, 2015 |
