= Maggie Pierce =

- Grey's Anatomy character
- The season thirteen promotional photograph of Kelly McCreary as Dr. Maggie Pierce
- First appearance: "Everything I Try to Do, Nothing Seems to Turn Out Right" (10.23); May 8, 2014 (as guest star) "All I Could Do Was Cry" (11.11); February 12, 2015 (as series regular)
- Last appearance: "Happily Ever After?" (19.20); May 18, 2023 (as series regular) "We Built This City" (22.02); October 16, 2025 (as guest star)
- Created by: Shonda Rhimes
- Portrayed by: Kelly McCreary

In-universe information
- Full name: Margaret Pierce
- Gender: Female
- Title(s): Co-Chief of Cardiothoracic Surgery; M.D. F.A.C.S.
- Occupation: Attending cardiothoracic surgeon at Grey Sloan Memorial Hospital
- Family: Bill Pierce (adoptive father); Diane Pierce (adoptive mother, deceased); Richard Webber (biological father); Ellis Grey (biological mother; deceased); Meredith Grey (half-sister); Derek Shepherd (Brother In Law; deceased); Zola Grey-Shepherd (Niece); Derek Bailey Shepherd (Nephew); Ellis Shepherd (Niece)
- Spouse: Winston Ndugu (m. 2021; div. 2024)
- Significant others: Dean (ex-fiancé); Andrew DeLuca (ex-boyfriend; deceased); Clive Johnson (ex-affair); Jackson Avery (ex-boyfriend); Ethan Boyd (ex-boyfriend)
- Nationality: American
- Born: 1983

Margaret "Maggie" Pierce, M.D., F.A.C.S., is a fictional character from the medical drama Grey's Anatomy, which airs on the American Broadcasting Company (ABC), portrayed by Kelly McCreary. Created by series producer Shonda Rhimes, Maggie first appeared in the penultimate episode of the show's tenth season and was promoted to a series regular by the eleventh season's eleventh episode. Her character is revealed to be the biological daughter of Richard Webber (James Pickens Jr.) and Ellis Grey (Kate Burton), making her the half-sister of series protagonist Meredith Grey (Ellen Pompeo).

Maggie is characterized as "perky" and "chatty" but also extremely focused on her academic career. She was a child prodigy, having graduated from medical school at the remarkably young age of 19, and by the time she is introduced in the series, she has become the head of the cardiothoracic surgery department at just 27 years old.

== Storylines ==
Maggie is introduced in the 23rd episode of the tenth season of Grey's Anatomy, during Cristina Yang’s search for her replacement as the head of Cardiothoracic Surgery. Maggie, a prodigy who finished high school and medical school by the age of 19, became the head of her department at 27. In the Season 10 finale, titled “Fear (Of the Unknown)”, it is revealed that Maggie’s biological mother is Ellis Grey, making her the half-sister of Meredith Grey. Richard Webber, who had an affair with Ellis, is stunned by the news, realizing that he is Maggie's biological father.

Throughout Season 11, Maggie navigates her new role at Grey Sloan Memorial Hospital while dealing with her complicated family history. When she discovers that Meredith is her half-sister, she attempts to bond with her, but Meredith initially resists. The revelation of their shared parentage causes friction between them, but eventually, Meredith and Maggie come to terms with their relationship. At the same time, Richard struggles to reconcile with the fact that he has a biological daughter he never knew about. Maggie, who had previously discovered Ellis’ identity while searching for her birth mother, is initially hurt and confused by Richard’s behavior but later forgives him for not being there for her growing up. The two gradually develop a father-daughter bond.

Maggie also develops friendships with her colleagues, including Meredith, Alex Karev, and Callie Torres. As Maggie integrates into her newfound family, she becomes a maternal figure to Meredith’s children after Derek’s death in season 11, and she, Meredith, and Amelia Shepherd form a “sisterhood” of sorts, sharing responsibilities in caring for the kids. Maggie helps mediate the frequent conflicts between Meredith and Amelia, further solidifying her role in the Grey family.

In Season 12, Maggie begins a relationship with intern Andrew DeLuca, but they keep it a secret to avoid complications at work. However, their relationship becomes strained due to the secrecy, and DeLuca eventually ends things. Maggie later develops feelings for Nathan Riggs, unaware that Meredith has already started a relationship with him. This causes tension between the two sisters, especially when Maggie confesses her feelings to Meredith, who hides the truth from her. The rift between Maggie and Meredith intensifies when Meredith continues to lie about her relationship with Riggs.

In Season 13, Maggie’s personal life is further challenged when her mother, Diane, comes to Seattle for treatment. Maggie is devastated to learn that her mother has terminal cancer. Diane’s death profoundly affects Maggie, who begins to reevaluate her life outside of work. Jackson Avery supports her through her grief, and the two grow closer, eventually developing romantic feelings for each other. In Season 14, Maggie and Jackson begin a relationship after initially trying to suppress their feelings.

In Season 16, after her breakup with Jackson, Maggie faces one of the biggest challenges of her career when her cousin, Sabi, dies during surgery. This tragedy causes Maggie to question her abilities as a surgeon, leading her to quit her job at Grey Sloan Memorial. Her depression worsens when Sabi's family sues her for medical malpractice, but with Richard’s support, Maggie settles out of court and eventually rejoins Grey Sloan.

In Season 17, Maggie reconnects with Winston Ndugu, a former colleague, at a medical conference, and they begin a long-distance relationship. As the COVID-19 pandemic hits, Winston surprises Maggie by traveling to Seattle to help at the hospital, and their relationship deepens. Winston proposes to Maggie, and they marry in the season 17 finale.

== Development ==
=== Casting and creation ===
McCreary on the role

When I auditioned, all they told me was that the character might recur a little bit into Season 11; they did not tell me it was Meredith's sister and there was long-term potential. I had no idea the scope of it in terms of how [she] fit into the mythology of the series. Her character ties into a lot of things that have already occurred in these people's lives.

— Benjamin Lindsay, Backstage 2015

Kelly McCreary was cast in Grey's Anatomy in a guest star role that debuted on May 8, 2014, and later revealed to be Meredith Grey's half-sister, Maggie Pierce. According to TVLine, McCreary, best known for her role on The CW's short lived medical drama Emily Owens, M.D., and her guest appearances on Scandal, was originally unaware of the significance of her character when she auditioned using dummy sides for a role named "Claudette". McCreary was told only that the character was adopted, would recur, and play an important role. It wasn’t until Shonda Rhimes personally informed her before the script reading for the season 10 finale that Maggie was the daughter of Ellis Grey and Richard Webber.

Initially, McCreary was guest-starring until the eleventh episode of Season 11, but on October 23, 2014, it was announced that she had been promoted to series regular. McCreary recalled that it wasn’t until she saw her castmates' reactions to Maggie’s identity reveal that she realized how significant her role was going to be.. The concept of Meredith having a half-sibling was first hinted at in the press in February 2009 by Michael Ausiello, and while initial speculation suggested Jesse Williams' character Jackson Avery might be the child of Ellis Grey and Richard Webber, those rumors were debunked. Shonda Rhimes later confirmed that Maggie’s character had been in the original plans for the show, although her introduction didn’t solidify until season 4.

=== Characterization ===
In an interview with BuddyTV, McCreary expressed her excitement and passion for portraying Maggie, emphasizing the character's complexity and dynamic nature. She said, "I just feel like it's a rare opportunity to be able to play somebody that is so complex and fully realized and smart and fierce and compassionate and awkward and the whole thing." McCreary highlighted Maggie's professional excellence, stating, "I think she's a really good doctor... She's obviously super-bright. She's very young to be as high in her field as she is." She further described Maggie as a "really great problem-solver" with the ability to remain "very compassionate" while maintaining a clear head and doing "the right thing medically all the time."

Maggie, who initially seemed "all business," later revealed her neurotic and existential side, adding layers to her character. McCreary relished in playing "Maggie's neurotic, existential, meltdown side," showing that Maggie "won't really back down from a fight" and is "very decisive" when faced with challenges.

=== Introduction ===
Kate Aurthur highlighted that until Maggie's introduction, Grey's Anatomy was not typically known for planting stories seasons in advance. The show's narrative didn't revolve around "twisty mythology" like other series. However, Maggie's storyline was an exception. Shonda Rhimes, the show's creator, revealed that Maggie's introduction had been a topic of discussion for years but the timing was never right. In season 3, when Grey's introduced Meredith's paternal half-sister Lexie Grey (Chyler Leigh), the idea of bringing in Maggie became more serious. However, after Lexie's death in the Season 8 finale, Rhimes still felt it was too soon for Maggie’s arrival. Rhimes even considered that the show might conclude without Maggie ever being introduced. But when the time was finally right, Rhimes said to the writers, "You guys, it's time".

When Maggie is revealed as Ellis Grey's child to Richard Webber, viewers are intrigued by her backstory. The second episode of the season, aptly titled "Puzzle With a Piece Missing", centers around Maggie’s lifelong struggle to find her place and her feeling that something has always been missing, despite being close to her adoptive parents. McCreary, who plays Maggie, commented on this "dark underbelly" of Maggie, contrasting with her seemingly put-together exterior. Despite her best intentions, Maggie initially struggles to fit in at Grey Sloan Memorial, sharing confidential information about Alex Karev (Justin Chambers) and unintentionally insulting the hospital board in an attempt to support Miranda Bailey (Chandra Wilson). She also serves as a mentor to Jo Wilson (Camilla Luddington). As Maggie's connection with Richard grows, it sets the stage for the revelation that he is her biological father.

McCreary explained that Maggie's story resonates with viewers who can relate to the "awkwardness of being the new kid". Despite Maggie’s strong professional background, the episode reveals her personal loneliness. Notably, this Maggie-centric episode also featured McCreary as the narrator, a role usually reserved for Meredith Grey (Ellen Pompeo) or other veteran cast members. McCreary described the experience of being the episode's focus as both "terrifying" and a privilege, noting that it was overwhelming but gratifying to be trusted with such a central role so early in her tenure . Learning Maggie's history through the script was a "huge gift" for McCreary, as it gave her a clear understanding of who Maggie is.

== Reception ==
Critics responded positively to the development of Pierce in her centric episode, "Puzzle with a Piece Missing". Fempop praised the episode, describing it as "a funny and insightful look both into this latest interloper and the established characters of Grey's." The review highlighted Pierce's distinct personality, stating, "Thankfully she's her own person, confident and happy to bring the thunder and put everyone, from interns to the chief of surgery, into their places."

Entertainment Weekly lauded the decision to focus on Maggie so soon after Cristina Yang's departure, noting that it helped the show navigate Yang's absence. The review commended how the episode made Maggie more relatable, adding, "This episode is about how Maggie is her own, very likable person."

TV Fanatic also acknowledged that the episode helped audiences get to know Maggie better, describing her as a "work in progress" and expressing optimism that she would eventually grow on the audience.

By Season 13, Maggie Fremont of Vulture spoke highly of the character’s growth, emphasizing how difficult it is for a long-running show to introduce a new character and immediately have them fit in. Fremont praised both the writing and McCreary's performance, stating that Maggie became endearing quickly, despite the initial challenge of filling the void left by Cristina Yang. "She is weird and neurotic and cheerful. She is nothing like Cristina, but she fills a void that Meredith needs filled in order to function. Can you really imagine Grey's without Maggie Pierce?"
