= Puzzle with a Piece Missing =

- Grey's Anatomy episode
- Episode no.: Season 11; Episode 2
- Directed by: Rob Corn
- Written by: William Harper
- Original air date: October 2, 2014
- Running time: 43 minutes

Episode chronology
← Previous "I Must Have Lost it on the Wind"	Next → "Got to Be Real"
- Grey's Anatomy season 11

"Puzzle with a Piece Missing" is the second episode of the eleventh season of the American television medical drama Grey's Anatomy, and is the 222nd episode overall. It aired on October 2, 2014, on ABC in the United States. The episode was written by William Harper and directed by Rob Corn. On its initial airing it was watched by 9.15 million viewers and was well received amongst critics.

== Plot ==
Maggie tries to get used to Grey Sloan Memorial Hospital, and learns the difficulty of connecting with others. Jo, trying to win over Maggie, tells her about Alex's dilemma involving Dr. Oliver Lebackes' private practice and his seat on the board. Maggie discloses this information during surgery with the two, which results in Alex being fired from the private practice.

After an extended argument, Callie decides that Arizona should do the fetal surgery fellowship and that they would work it out with having a second child. For Owen, this episode is about his ability to trust Maggie. When Maggie asks to look into the McNeill family—a.k.a. Yang's last patients before her exit—he instantly becomes defensive.

But before Richard can explain just how well he knew Ellis, Maggie is pulled to the ER by Amelia, who loves her simply for calling Derek “the other Shepherd.” Maggie finds herself beginning a friendship in Amelia and finds out that Meredith is not so bad to know. She expresses interest in Bailey's genome mapping project, and she uses it and Cristina's research with the McNeil family to solve their family's case; the children's cardiomyopathy was caused by a gene mutation.

Due to her conversation with Amelia, Maggie tells Meredith that Ellis Grey is her mother, too. Meredith does not believe her however, saying that at the age of five years she would have known if her mother was pregnant.

== Reviews ==
The episode was well received among critics with many praising Kelly McCreary's new character Maggie Pierce. Fempop gave a largely positive review writing, "Puzzle With a Piece Missing is a funny and insightful look both into this latest interloper and the established characters of Grey’s." praising the new addition, "Thankfully she’s (Pierce) her own person, confident and happy to bring the thunder and put everyone, from interns to the chief of surgery, into their places."

Entertainment Weekly lauded the episode stating, "Coming into the second week without Cristina Yang, Grey’s was smart to focus all of its attention on the newcomer. With most other main characters only making occasional cameos, it made it more difficult to feel Yang’s absence. And by showing Maggie’s side of the story, it made her more relatable. It was a win-win." adding on McCreary's character, " this episode is about how Maggie is her own, very likable person."

On her character TV Fanatic wrote, Overall, we got to know Maggie a little better and it's nice to see that she's made some friends. It was a fair episode that showed Maggie's basically a work in progress. Maybe she'll grow on us eventually."
