= Emily Owens, M.D. =

American medical drama TV series

- Genre: Medical drama
- Created by: Jennie Snyder Urman
- Starring: Mamie Gummer; Justin Hartley; Aja Naomi King; Kelly McCreary; Michael Rady; Necar Zadegan
- Narrated by: Mamie Gummer
- Composers: Transcenders; Jim Dooley
- Country of origin: United States
- Original language: English
- No. of seasons: 1
- No. of episodes: 13

Production
- Executive producers: Jennie Snyder Urman; Dan Jinks; Bharat Nalluri
- Producers: Jae Marchant; Paul Sciarrotta; Grace Gilroy (pilot only)
- Production location: Denver, U.S.
- Running time: 41–42 minutes
- Production companies: The Dan Jinks Company; Warner Bros. Television; CBS Television Studios

Original release
- Network: The CW
- Release: October 16, 2012 – February 5, 2013

Emily Owens, M.D. is an American medical drama television series created by Jennie Snyder Urman. It was picked up by The CW on May 11, 2012. It premiered on The CW on October 16, 2012, and aired on Tuesdays at 9:00 pm Eastern/8:00 pm Central.

On November 28, 2012, the series was canceled by The CW. The thirteenth and final episode aired on February 5, 2013.

== Plot ==
The series followed the life of Emily Owens (Mamie Gummer) when she finally feels like she is a grown-up. She can finally put her high school days as the geeky girl with flop-sweats behind her. She's graduated from medical school, and she's beginning an internship at Denver Memorial Hospital, where, not-so-coincidentally, her med-school crush Will Collins (Justin Hartley) is also an intern.

She soon finds out the hard way that her high school nemesis, the gorgeous, popular and manipulative Cassandra Kopelson (Aja Naomi King) is also a new intern at Denver Memorial. Another fellow intern, Tyra Dupre (Kelly McCreary) warns Emily that the cliques at the hospital are all too familiar: the jocks have become orthopedic surgeons; the mean girls are in plastics; the rebels are in the ER; the stoners and slackers are anesthesiologists; nerds and geeks are neurologists, and Tyra has her own awkward place as the principal's kid – her father, Dr. Tim Dupre (Harry Lennix) is the Chief of Medicine. Tyra latches onto Emily as a new friend, and immediately begins confiding in her – the fact that Tyra is a lesbian, that she is interested in dating a certain nurse – nothing is too personal for Tyra to share with Emily.

She may have made one new friend, but it doesn't take long for Emily to realize that the long-standing rivalry she had with Cassandra back in high school is only going to grow. Now, both Emily and Cassandra are competing to impress the brilliant but stern and intolerant Dr. Gina Bandari (Necar Zadegan), a world-famous cardiothoracic surgeon who has been an inspiration and role model to both of them for years. While Emily and Cassandra vie for Dr. Bandari's approval, they're also competing for Will's attention. Will and Emily were friends in med school, although his handsome face and charming personality left Emily hoping for more. Will has made it clear, however, that he likes their relationship the way it is. Emily struggles to convince herself that being friends with Will is enough, but she has to admit it bothers her just to see Will and Cassandra talking together.

Meanwhile, Emily is also getting to know the slightly needy, but smart and handsome resident Dr. Micah Barnes (Michael Rady). Micah is faced with serious medical issues within his own family, and Emily's compassion proves an invaluable help. Impressed with Emily's medical skills, and warm bedside manner, Micah brings her in on a delicate surgery and talks her through the procedure, boosting her confidence and bringing them closer-both professionally and personally.

Even with the long hours, the heavy workload, and no shortage of personal drama filling her first days as an intern, Emily still feels like she's the new geeky kid all over again, and it's just as awkward as high school. At Denver Memorial, Emily is just beginning to learn that although she may be an insecure and socially awkward geek, she may also grow to be a great doctor, flop sweats and all.

== Cast and characters ==
=== Main cast and characters ===
- Mamie Gummer as Emily Owens; the series' protagonist. A first-year surgical intern at Denver Memorial Hospital, who was ready to put her high-school days behind her. However, Emily quickly discovered that the hospital was just like high school and that it might be hard to shake her insecure, geeky-girl ways, especially in the presence of her high school nemesis and med-school crush.
- Justin Hartley as Will Collins; A handsome and charming first-year surgical intern at Denver Memorial Hospital, who was a former friend of Emily's from medical school and who is oblivious that she has a crush on him.
- Aja Naomi King as Cassandra Kopelson; the series' primary antagonist. The gorgeous and popular first-year surgical intern Cassandra Kopelson, who just happens to be Emily's high-school nemesis. Charming and charismatic in public, but cold and manipulative in private, and somewhat soulless, Cassandra is determined to take everything that Emily has and wants for herself as well as lie, cheat, steal, push and shove to further advance up the ranks of the hospital.
- Kelly McCreary as Tyra Dupre; A first-year surgical intern, who quickly befriends Emily and also had the misfortune of being the daughter of the chief of surgery. Her father doesn't know that she's a lesbian.
- Michael Rady as Micah Barnes; A smart and handsome resident, who was responsible for the interns and takes Emily under his wing.
- Necar Zadegan as Gina Bandari; The tough-as-nails world-famous cardiothoracic surgeon, the doctor who both inspires and intimidates all the interns.

=== Recurring cast and characters ===
- Julia Sarah Stone as Abbey
- J. R. Ramirez as Dr. A.J. Aquino
- Harry Lennix as Tim Dupre
- Mark Ghanimé as Dr. Jamie Albagetti
- Michelle Harrison as Jessica
- Catherine Barroll as Joyce Barnes
- Christine Willes as E.R. Nurse
- Brittany Ishibashi as Dr. Kelly Hamata
- Christian Tessier as Leo

== Development and production ==
In May 2012, The CW placed an order for the series under the original title First Cut. The pilot was available on CWTV.com, Facebook, Twitter, YouTube, Hulu, iTunes, and on Mobile App, about three weeks before its premiere on The CW, and on YouTube a week before the premiere. The series was shot in Vancouver, British Columbia, Canada, notably at Burnaby Central Secondary School and the University of British Columbia.

== Episodes ==
No.	Title	Directed by	Written by	Original release date	US viewers (millions)
1	"Pilot"	Bharat Nalluri	Jennie Snyder Urman	October 16, 2012	1.67
Emily Owens, an extremely neurotic, insecure and klutzy intern fresh out of med school, believes that her life is pretty much on track – until she gets to the hospital of her dreams, only to find out that her high school arch-enemy is also there and is bent on continuing to make Emily's life miserable. On Emily's first day, she gets a teenage patient who thinks her fainting was caused by a crush on a boy. However, she turns out to have cardiac tamponade, forcing Emily to perform an intense medical procedure on her first day. Afterward, Emily confesses her romantic feelings to her longtime crush, Will, only to be shut down. Later she finds out that he is interested in Cassandra, her nemesis, who has an agenda to push and shove to climb up the hospital ranks. Emily befriends fellow intern Tyra, who is the daughter of the chief of surgery, as well as her surgical resident Dr. Micah Barnes, but gets on the no-nonsense Dr. Gina Bandari's bad side after she loses her pager.
2	"Emily and... the Alan Zolman Incident"	Bharat Nalluri	Jennie Snyder Urman	October 23, 2012	1.11
Emily tries to get everything back to normal with Will, since she confessed her love to him. Emily is put on the case of a man who needs a heart transplant but with his medical condition it isn't possible. Emily begins to notice that the nurses may be mad at her because they put her on a case of a woman who has OCD, and needs her to always clean. Tyra tries to help Emily with the nurses hating her, while Emily tries to get Tyra's mind off Jessica, the nurse who's having an affair with her father. Micah's mom starts to question the chemotherapy treatments; Emily tells Will that she's okay with him not liking her 'that way' and he says that he's afraid to ruin their friendship. Emily continues to fight for her heart patient's rights when her patient with OCD tells her of laws that could help her, only to discover that the patient could have a brain tumor. Also, Dr. Bandari gets even angrier at Emily when she finds out that Emily went over her head to get the MRI, and Micah tells Emily about his mom's pancreatic cancer.
3	"Emily and... the Outbreak"	David Warren	Joanna Johnson	October 30, 2012	1.03
Emily decides that in order to get over Will she needs to focus on his flaws. During rounds Dr. Bandari starts by quizzing the interns, and Emily loses to Cassandra, winning Cassandra an assist on a gallbladder operation. In the ER, Emily and Tyra get the case of a girl who fell on her head. Tyra confesses when she knew she liked women. After treating a girl for an STD, Dr. Bandari instructs Emily to go to the local high school to teach the kids on safe sex. When talking to their patient, Emily and Tyra find out how she might've gotten whatever problem she has. At the ER, Emily finds out that the girls she spoke to beat up the boy that gave them all an STD. In the beginning of the surgery, Cassandra can't get the courage to make the first cut and freezes, thus making her look bad and Dr. Bandari to take over the surgery. Emily and Tara's patient starts to cough up blood, and find out that she breathed in fungus, and the treatment could stop her from doing gymnastics. Will and Emily are threatened by the mother of the boy with the STD, until she finds out what he has, and apologizes.
4	"Emily and... the Predator"	Bharat Nalluri	John C. Kelley	November 13, 2012	1.38
Emily's latest patient is an Indian woman who needs a kidney transplant, and while her newlywed husband is a match, their marriage is arranged and she is unsure she wants to stay married to him and does not want him to make such a sacrifice under the circumstances. A surrogate mother, carrying her sister's twins, is not allowed to make her own decisions regarding the fate of her unborn babies. Emily makes her first cut in the operating room.
5	"Emily and... the Tell-Tale Heart"	Howard Deutch	David Babcock	November 20, 2012	1.29
Though she is told not to attempt to treat the addiction, Emily tries to help a drug addict who is brought into the ER and then admitted. Micha treats a young boy who needs a liver transplant and while his sister is a match, tests reveal that the boy's biological father is not the father who has raised him. When Tyra's former boyfriend shows up at the hospital, Tyra asks Emily to pretend the man is still her boyfriend so she does not have to come out to her father. Micah refuses to tell his mother the truth about her pancreatic cancer progress for fear she will stop fighting.
6	"Emily and... the Question of Faith"	Jamie Babbit	Paul Sciarrotta	November 27, 2012	1.05
Emily gives Dr. Bandari constructive criticism on her attending evaluation, but tries to get it back after finding out that Dr. Bandari reads them all herself. Meanwhile, Will asks Cassandra to make an effort to be friends with Emily, and they both watch while Will makes his first cut on the operating table. Will admits to the woman he operated on that he once wanted to date Emily. Dr. Bandari's first heart patient comes in for another procedure however he must remain awake due to an allergic reaction to the anesthesia. While being operated on, he dies for a few minutes and Dr. Bandari brings him back to life, but once awake the man starts to question his faith in God. A young couple bring their son in for stomach pains and find out that he is intersex and they have to decide if they want him to remain a boy or switch genders. Tyra finds out about her father's affair and that Emily knew about it. Tyra then tells Cassandra that Emily asked Will not to date her. Emily tells Cassandra that she had feelings for Will and that it is tough for her to see them together. Will meets Cassandra outside of the locker room and tries to kiss her but she says they should keep their relationship professional when inside the hospital. This is really out of respect for Emily, who is standing nearby watching. Elsewhere, Tyra finally tells her father that she is gay and makes amends with Emily by returning the evaluation of Dr. Bandari that she wrote.
7	"Emily and... the Good and the Bad"	Elizabeth Allen	Caitlin Parrish	December 4, 2012	1.41
It's Cassandra and Emily's birthdays, but Emily doesn't want anybody to know. Will then invites everybody to a party at Emily's apartment to celebrate. Manuel, a man who works in the flower shop at the hospital, collapses and they find out he has a mass on his lung indicating cancer. Since the surgery would be too expensive for him, Emily asks the Chief if they can perform the surgery pro bono. Meanwhile, Will and Emily are put on a heart patient case who is a convict and needs to be restrained at all times. Also, Tyra and the Chief make up and he decides to tell his wife about the affair he had. Kelly asks Micah if he has feelings for Emily, as she saw them together laughing with his mother. At the birthday party, Will finds out that Emily plays the cello and she plays "Cello Suite No.1 in G Major" for everybody.
8	"Emily and... the Car and the Cards"	Stuart Gillard	Mo Masi & Jennie Snyder Urman	January 1, 2013	1.30
When a female car accident victim is brought into the ER with a spike through her torso, Emily and everyone else immediately blames her boyfriend for causing the accident. She makes it through surgery, but the doctors find that she may be paralyzed. Later, they discover that the boyfriend has lupus, which could be to blame for the accident. The case brings up painful memories for Will. Meanwhile, Emily deals with a model with jaw cancer who refuses to undergo surgery. Also, Emily and Cassandra compete for Will's attention as they all prepare for the in-service exam.
9	"Emily and... the Love of Larping"	Arlene Sanford	Ben Zaretsky	January 8, 2013	1.09
A man gets admitted in a costume and claims to be King Paravel from the Elvish nation. The man later goes blind which leads Will to believe he is suffering from conversion disorder, a psychiatric problem. Emily refuses to jump to conclusion so quickly. Another patient is a woman diagnosed with cancer who later passes away due to an unexpected cardiac arrest. Her upset daughter sues Micah for medical malpractice. In an attempt to prove that she is not predictable, Emily agrees to let Tyra dress her up for a blind date arranged by Cassandra. Emily shows up to the date looking stunning which later causes Will to act jealous. Micah realizes his true feelings for Emily. Also, Dr. Bandari realizes she has been putting career before life and attempts to change it.
10	"Emily and... the Social Experiment"	Bharat Nalluri	John C. Kelley	January 15, 2013	1.02
Emily conducts an experiment to prove that Will is jealous and likes her. At first, she fails when flirting with a gay co-worker. After, Tyra gives her some tips on how to flirt, which Emily practices on the playboy doctor, who constantly follows her afterwards, asking for a date. Will saves her when he asks her what she is doing for the night by going over to her place to help her build a bookshelf. Unfortunately, he falls asleep while she goes out to buy beer.
11	"Emily and... the Teapot"	Anton Cropper	Joanna Johnson	January 22, 2013	1.36
Emily helps a gay male adrenaline junkie express his love for his male friend who's straight. Meanwhile, she, Cassandra and Will are the finalists chosen by Dr. Bandari to become her research assistant. Bandari interviews each, asking them the pros and cons they see in each other. Will angers Cassandra by saying she is too self-centered, and she adds something about Will that causes Bandari to eliminate him. He says Emily gets too personally involved with her patients, from which Dr. Bandari bases the decision to choose Emily as her assistant. Both Cassandra and Will angrily storm off at the decision, much to the disappointment of Emily and Tyra. Drs. Aquino and Bandari are later seen flirting. Emily tells Micah over a bottle of wine that she is over Will, and that she wishes to be chosen first. Just as Micah is about express his feelings for her, Tyra interrupts to tell Emily she has been rejected.
12	"Emily and... the Perfect Storm"	Larry Shaw	David Babcock	January 29, 2013	1.33
A winter storm causes a bus wreck and the ER becomes a triage site, which Emily oversees. She also must perform emergency surgery on a war-hero Marine who collapses. Meanwhile, although Tyra believes her father gives her no respect as a doctor, they perform an emergency C-section together on a pregnant woman. Also, Cassandra feels threatened over Will's and Emily's friendship and finally breaks up with him. After the chaos at the hospital, Micah kisses Emily outside a bar, before Will announces the breakup to her and Tyra, yet again, interrupts them.
13	"Emily and... the Leap"	Jann Turner	Paul Sciarrotta	February 5, 2013	1.50
Emily and Micah talk about the events of the previous night and they come to a conclusion. Meanwhile, Micah's sister comes to visit upon hearing that her mom has cancer and may soon die since she is refusing treatment. At the same time, Emily deals with an ill-tempered elderly woman who is brought to the hospital suffering from an unknown viral skin infection, and Emily must find a diagnosis before the woman drives Emily more crazy with her belligerent attitude. Elsewhere, Will wrongly diagnoses a patient when he is distracted by Cassandra's cold behavior towards him since their breakup which results in the patient's death. Will decides to tell the truth about his error to the medical board over Cassandra's objections that it might open him and the entire hospital to a malpractice lawsuit. At the end, Emily finally decides between Micah and Will. The series ends with Emily and Will having sex for the first time in her apartment.

=== Ratings ===
#	Title	Original air date	Rating/Share (18–49)	Viewers (millions)
1	"Pilot"	October 16, 2012	0.5/1	1.67
2	"Emily and... the Alan Zolman Incident"	October 23, 2012	0.3/1	1.11
3	"Emily and... the Outbreak"	October 30, 2012	0.3/1	1.03
4	"Emily and... the Predator"	November 13, 2012	0.4/1	1.38
5	"Emily and... the Tell-Tale Heart"	November 20, 2012	0.4/1	1.29
6	"Emily and... the Question of Faith"	November 27, 2012	0.3/1	1.05
7	"Emily and... the Good and the Bad"	December 4, 2012	0.4/1	1.41
8	"Emily and... the Car and the Cards"	January 1, 2013	0.4/1	1.30
9	"Emily and... the Love of Larping"	January 8, 2013	0.3/1	1.09
10	"Emily and... the Social Experiment"	January 15, 2013	0.3/1	1.02
11	"Emily and... the Teapot"	January 22, 2013	0.4/1	1.36
12	"Emily and... the Perfect Storm"	January 29, 2013	0.4/1	1.33
13	"Emily and... the Leap"	February 5, 2013	0.4/1	1.50

== Reception ==
E! Online described it as a mix between Grey's Anatomy and Mean Girls. On the review aggregator website Metacritic, the show scored 47/100. Three years after the show was cancelled, the CW president Mark Pedowitz stated that the failure of the show helped the network realise what type of show their audience wanted, which enabled them to start ordering more shows that were like that. The realization would ultimately help improve overall ratings and critical reception for the network.

=== Awards and nominations ===
At the 34th Young Artist Awards the show won the award for "Best Performance in a TV Series – Guest Starring Young Actor Ten and Under" for Bruce Salomon.

== International broadcasts ==
The series was picked up in Canada by CTV Two and aired in simulcast. Network Ten planned to air the series in Australia. ETC aired the series in the Philippines.

In Hong Kong and the Netherlands, the series aired on TVB Pearl and Net5, respectively. In the United Kingdom, it will be shown weekly on Really from August 19, 2013 onwards. In Italy, it was shown daily on Rai 3 from August 11 to August 23, 2013. In France, TF6 broadcast the show on March 6, 2014 and M6 broadcast the show on March 24, 2014.
