= Richard Webber =

Fictional character

- Grey's Anatomy, Private Practice, and Station 19 character
- The season nine promotional photograph of James Pickens, Jr. as Dr. Richard Webber
- First appearance: "A Hard Day's Night" (1.01); March 27, 2005
- Created by: Shonda Rhimes
- Portrayed by: James Pickens, Jr.

In-universe information
- Title(s): M.D. FACS
- Occupation: Attending General Surgeon; Chief Medical Officer; Board Member (Former); Chief of Surgery (Former); Director of the Residency Program (Former)
- Family: Charles Webber (father; deceased); Gail Webber (mother; deceased); Chris Webber (brother); Unnamed sister; Jackson Avery (stepson)
- Spouses: Adele Webber (m. 1979; died 2012) Catherine Fox (m. 2016)
- Significant others: Ellis Grey (ex-affair; deceased)
- Children: Miscarriage (with Adele); Maggie Pierce
- Relatives: Sabrina "Sabi" Webber (niece; deceased)
- Born: 1954

Richard Webber, MD, PhD, FACS, is a fictional character from the ABC medical drama television series Grey's Anatomy. The character was created by Shonda Rhimes and is portrayed by actor James Pickens Jr. since the series' inception in 2005. Webber serves as the Chief of Surgery at Seattle Grace Mercy West Hospital (initially Seattle Grace) for 12 years, playing a significant role in shaping the hospital's dynamics. In season 6, Webber is forced to resign from his position due to his struggles with alcoholism and is temporarily replaced by Derek Shepherd (Patrick Dempsey). He later reclaims the role of chief in Season 7 but resigns again in Season 8 to protect Meredith Grey (Ellen Pompeo) from the consequences of a major clinical trial violation. Despite stepping down, Webber continues as a General Surgery attending, where his experience and legacy still earn him the respectful title of "Chief" from his colleagues.

Richard's character arc includes becoming the head of the residency program, where he mentors aspiring surgeons. His wisdom and guidance shape the next generation of doctors at the hospital. In Season 17, Richard ascends to the prestigious position of Chief of Chiefs of the Catherine Fox Foundation, further solidifying his leadership role within the medical community.

One of Webber's most significant character struggles is his battle with alcoholism, which has been explored throughout the series, especially in seasons 6 and 15. His addiction affects his professional life and his relationships, particularly with his wife Adele (Loretta Devine). Webber's complicated personal life is further impacted by a long-standing affair with Ellis Grey (Kate Burton), Meredith's mother, which happened before the series began. This affair has lasting consequences, including the discovery that Maggie Pierce (Kelly McCreary), a surgeon at the hospital, is his biological daughter. His relationships with Adele, Meredith, and Maggie become central to his emotional and professional journey throughout the series.

== Background ==
Richard Webber was born in 1954, the eldest of three children. His siblings include his brother Chris Webber, a former hardware store owner, and an unnamed younger sister. Chris is the father of Richard's niece, Sabrina, who has since died. Richard's mother, Gail Webber, was a music teacher and former receptionist who played the cello. Gail was born in 1918 and died from colon cancer at the age of 46 when Richard was only ten years old, around 1964.

Richard's relationship with his siblings is strained, as they believe he looks down on them due to his career as a doctor. While the exact motivation for Richard's decision to pursue a career in medicine has never been fully explored, it is heavily implied that his mother's diagnosis and death from colon cancer had a significant influence on his choice to become a doctor and surgeon.

== Surgical Career and Marriage ==
Richard married his wife, Adele (Loretta Devine), on Valentine's Day. During the residency at Seattle Grace, Richard had an affair with Ellis Grey (Kate Burton), Meredith Grey's (Ellen Pompeo) mother, despite both being married to other people at the time. Although Ellis left her husband in hopes of being with Richard, he ultimately could not bring himself to leave Adele. Decades later, Richard discovered that Adele had known about the affair all along but chose to stay with him. He later confessed that he ended the affair because he felt Ellis deserved better and that he carried too much emotional baggage. However, in Season 11, Richard admitted to Meredith that his ego and jealousy of Ellis' success as a surgeon played a significant role in the affair's end.

After completing his residency at Seattle Grace, Richard left to complete his fellowship. However, the show has continuity errors regarding where Richard built his career. At one point, Richard claims that, aside from his fellowship, he spent his entire career at Seattle Grace. Yet it is also established that he taught and befriended Derek Shepherd and Addison Montgomery, which suggests that a significant part of his career was spent in New York, possibly at Manhattan-based hospitals. The majority of references in the show, as well as external sources, imply that Richard spent a good portion of his professional life in Manhattan before returning to Seattle Grace. Additionally, it is shown that Richard graduated from Northwestern University, as evidenced by the degree displayed in his office.

== Storylines ==
The enigmatic Chief of Surgery at Seattle Grace is a leading figure in the show. Always vigilant, seeking and trying new things, his ambition is to see Seattle Grace as the top surgical program in the country. This sometimes leads him to make daring decisions. In Season 1, the surgical program is presented as one of the best in the United States. Later in the series, his wife Adele (Loretta Devine) asks him to retire, forcing him to choose between his career and their marriage. He tries to skirt around it, but Adele, tired of waiting, makes her choice and leaves him. He moves out and sleeps in his office for a short time. Since he learned of Ellis Grey's (Kate Burton) Alzheimer's diagnosis, Richard began visiting her regularly, but upon deciding to attempt a reconciliation with Adele, he realizes that he can no longer continue his emotional affair with Ellis. He attempts to patch things up with his wife, but is stunned to find out that she has apparently moved on to someone else. In the meantime, Richard makes plans to retire and must name his successor. He first thought of recommending Dr. Preston Burke (Isaiah Washington) as his successor, but after the secret of Burke's tremor and cover-up came out, that plan is put on hold. Nevertheless, he tells the hospital board of his retirement but has yet to name his successor; Dr. Derek Shepherd (Patrick Dempsey), Preston, Dr. Addison Montgomery (Kate Walsh) and Dr. Mark Sloan (Eric Dane) are all eagerly clamoring for the post. Richard eventually chooses Derek, but Derek tells Richard that he should remain chief.

Near the end of Season 3, Adele is admitted to the hospital and is discovered to be pregnant (at 52 years old). Though he believes the father to be the man Adele insinuated to be seeing months earlier, Richard stays by Adele's side as she is treated. However, due to complications, she loses the baby. Adele later admits to Richard that the baby, which was a boy, was actually his. At the conclusion of Season 3, Richard and Adele decide to give their marriage another try.

At the beginning of Season 4, Richard and Adele declare that his work is the reason that their marriage has failed and separate. He consequently moves in with Derek in his trailer home and tries to repair his life as a divorcée for the remainder of the season until, by the end, he reasserts his good reputation to his wife and wins her back.

At the start of Season 5, Richard starts to deal with the fact that Seattle Grace's surgical program ranking has been suffering. Determined to repair his hospital's reputation, he has become determined to enforce a new tougher series of hospital rules. Adding to his new behavior, he seems to becoming more and more agitated by Meredith Grey's (Ellen Pompeo) presence in his life as she is a reminder to him of every mistake he has made over the years. Over the course of the season, he becomes resentful of his mentee in General Surgery, Dr. Miranda Bailey (Chandra Wilson)'s decision to leave the General Surgery program to embark upon a fellowship in Pediatric surgery and attempts to prevent it in any way possible; he gives her an uninspiring letter of recommendation and buys a surgical robot for General Surgery to "lure" Bailey back to the program. However, as he finally comes to terms with Bailey's choice, she confides to the Chief that her husband has left her with an ultimatum - if she takes the fellowship in Pediatrics, he will divorce her. Bailey tells the Chief that she has decided that she will leave her husband herself, but that she still cannot take the Pediatrics fellowship, because she will now be a single mother.

In Season 6, he has been under a lot of stress. In the episode "New History" many of his colleagues believe he is having an affair due to his odd decisions and mistakes lately, but it is revealed at the end of the episode that the chief has gone back to drinking again. At first, he tells Meredith, who he has taken under his wing to help out learning new skills, that he wasn't an alcoholic, but rather in a state of depression, and he promised that his eggnog at Christmas would be his last drink. However Meredith discovers him at the bar very drunk, showing that he has indeed relapsed. He was given the choice by Derek and the board, to retire early or enter a rehab program where he would receive help for his drinking, and possibly gain his job back. Richard contemplated throwing away his career, which caused him and Derek to get in a shouting match. He later handed Derek the papers agreeing to enter rehab. After rehab, Richard returns as a General Surgery attending and performs awake surgery on Harper Avery. On the day of the shooting, he enters the hospital against police orders and presumably convinces Gary Clark (Michael O'Neill) to shoot himself.

Following the shooting, Derek impulsively quits as Chief and Richard is re-instated. It appears that Adele is starting to show early symptoms of Alzheimer's and he starts a diabetes clinical trial based on Ellis' diaries. When he asks Meredith to be a part of his trial, she declines and joins Derek's trial on Alzheimer's instead. Adele later receives a spot on Derek's trial. During the trial, Meredith tampers with the drugs so that Adele does not receive the placebo. After the truth is revealed, which causes Meredith to lose her job, Richard takes the blame and steps down as chief of surgery to protect her, being replaced by Dr. Owen Hunt (Kevin McKidd). As Adele's condition deteriorates, Richard is forced to have her placed at Rose Ridge Home for Extended Care. Catherine Avery (Debbie Allen) comes to Seattle and develops an interest in Richard but he refuses her advances because he is a married man. However, discovering that Adele, who does not recognize him anymore, has started a relationship with a new man at Rose Ridge, he lets her go.

In Season 8, Richard and Catherine run into each other in the hotel where they are staying while in San Francisco to serve as examiners for the boards and have a one-night stand. However, Catherine's son Jackson (Jesse Williams), who was also there to take his boards and worked under Richard at Seattle Grace Mercy West, is horrified after finding out about the relationship.

While on the way to Bailey's wedding, Richard gets a phone call alerting him that Adele has been rushed to the hospital. Bailey and Meredith perform emergency surgery, which was successful. However, it is revealed that Adele died of a heart attack while recovering in the ICU. He later embarks on a relationship with Catherine.

A superstorm hits the hospital and creates a power outage. After operating on a former case of Bailey's, he goes in the electrical room and finds the man who was in charge of the generators lying on the ground. He sends him to an OR and stays in the room to restore the power but is seemingly electrocuted. In the Season 10 premiere, when Richard gets electrocuted, he says that his parents were there at his white coat ceremony, but seasons later, he explains how his mom died when he was younger.

Richard slowly recovers from his electrical injuries after putting Meredith as his POA. Richard returns to work and is given a retirement package from Hunt on his birthday. Richard accepts an offer to become the head of the residency program mentoring the residents. He continues his relationship with Catherine and plans to propose. Richard chats with Dr. Maggie Pierce (Kelly McCreary) after her first day at Grey Sloan Memorial who says that it was surreal to work at a place that shares a name with Ellis Grey, her birth mother. Maggie bears a striking resemblance to Richard, suggesting that he is her father.

As Season 11 progresses, it is revealed through moments of flashbacks from Meredith that Maggie is in fact Richard's daughter, and that Ellis gave her up out of shame and suffering from depression. Upon finding out the truth, Richard doesn't tell Maggie the news straight away out of fear Maggie will reject and blame him for giving her up. This causes Richard to act strangely around her, causing Bailey to wonder if he is sleeping with her, Richard correcting her on this mistake causes other members of staff to find out the truth before Maggie. After the truth is revealed, Maggie is angry with Richard and ignores and rebuffs him for some time. Later on in the season, the pair are seen to have bonded and are now friends, with Richard and Meredith sharing stories with Maggie about Ellis.

In the Season 13 episode "The Room Where It Happens", when a male patient is wheeled into the OR, where Meredith, Hunt, and Stephanie Edwards (Jerrika Hinton) are waiting, Webber shows up to help having napped all day. Webber wants the patient to be given a name, he picks Gail, a cello player and music teacher. During the episode, each of the doctors has a flashback to a tragic incident from their past. We learn near the end of the episode, Gail was Webber's mother, who had advanced pancreatic cancer and died when he was ten.

Webber again fell ill in Season 16, but received treatment and returned in the first episode of Season 17 consequently being thrown back in to work in the middle of the COVID-19 pandemic. Meredith gives Webber her power of attorney after contracting the virus, and in the winter finale of Season 17, he makes the decision to put her on a ventilator.
