= Sally Pressman =

American actress and dancer

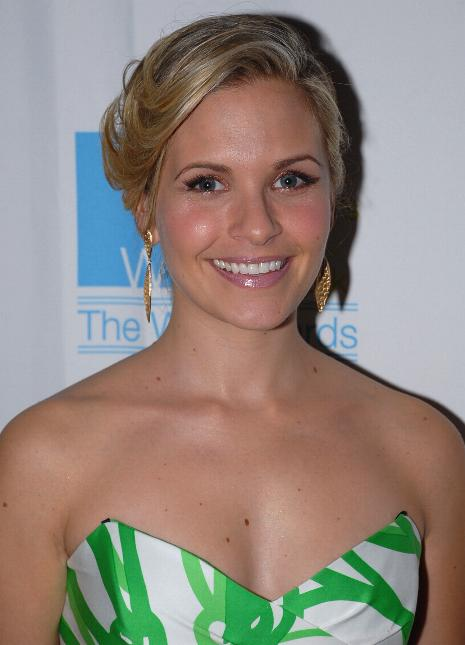
- At the Women's Image Network Awards in 2007.
- Born: Sally Pressman Bernstein; New York City, U.S.
- Occupations: Actress, dancer
- Years active: 2003–present
- Spouse: David Clayton Rogers (m. 2011)
- Children: 2

Sally Pressman Bernstein is an American actress and dancer. She is perhaps best known for her role as Roxy LeBlanc on the Lifetime television series Army Wives (2007–2013).

== Early life ==
Pressman was born Sally Pressman Bernstein in New York City. She is the daughter of Penny Ann Pressman and Jonathan Bernstein. Pressman has a brother, Benjamin Rhodes Bernstein. Her maternal grandparents were Rhoda and William Manny Pressman. William Pressman, as Executive Vice President of Hasbro Toys, is credited for creating the G.I. Joe action figure, an armed forces doll. Her maternal great-uncle was Jack Pressman, the founder of Pressman Toy Corporation.

As a child, she attended Spence School for girls in New York. She was classically trained in ballet and was a member of the Manhattan Ballet Company. She graduated with a Bachelor of Arts degree in theater studies from Yale University, where she also participated in such productions as The Merchant of Venice, The Dining Room, Freedomland and Sylvia. In London, she played in the West End premiere of Burleigh Grime$ in the role of Mrs. Grimes (2004).

== Career ==
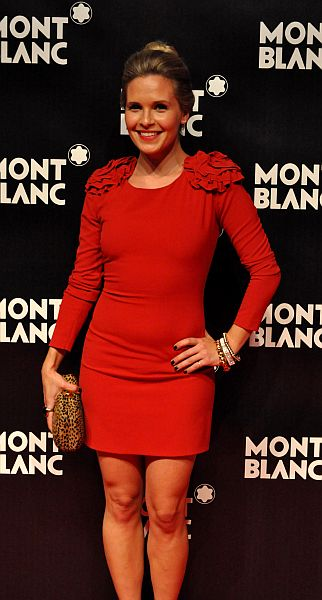
Pressman in September 2010

Apart from a minor role in the film Swordswallowers and Thin Men, shot at Yale while she was still a student, her film career effectively began in 2006 with the independent horror film, Last Rites of the Dead. She also appeared in another independent horror film, The Dread, released in 2007. In 2006, she appeared on the pilot episode of CBS series Shark, and later guest-starred in Criminal Minds.

Pressman is best known for her role as Roxy LeBlanc on the Lifetime Television drama series Army Wives. She was regular cast member in the first six seasons (2007 to 2012). In 2013 she appeared in two episodes of season 7. With other members of the Army Wives cast, she joined the picket line on November 13, 2007 in support of striking writers. She also played the lead role in Lifetime movie Love Sick: Secrets of a Sex Addict, and guest-starred on CBS sitcom The New Adventures of Old Christine in 2008. In 2013, she landed a lead role in an NBC comedy pilot Joe, Joe and Jane.

In 2013, Pressman was cast in recurring role as Candace Marcus, a daughter of Lisa Kudrow's character, in the third season of Shonda Rhimes drama series Scandal. In 2014 she guest-starred in the episode of CBS series Person of Interest. She also co-starred alongside Brandon Routh and Dane Cook in the sci-fi thriller film, 400 Days. In September, 2014 she was cast of the fourth season in the ABC series, Once Upon a Time, and appeared in Shonda Rhimes' Grey's Anatomy as Young Ellis Grey in flashbacks. This role previously played Sarah Paulson in Season 6. In 2016, she guest starred in two episodes of The Catch, another Rhimes' drama. Later that year, she was cast in a recurring role as Debi Mazar"s character's love interest on Younger. From 2018 to 2021, she had a recurring role in the NBC series Good Girls. Pressman also starred in an episode titled "My Monster" of Disney+ anthology series Just Beyond in 2021.

== Personal life ==
On October 19, 2010, Pressman became engaged to her longtime boyfriend David Clayton Rogers. The couple met at Lesly Kahn's Acting Studio. They married September 17, 2011, and have a son, Josh, and a daughter, Chloe.

== Filmography ==
=== Film ===
Year	Title	Role	Notes
2003	Swordswallowers and Thin Men	Monica	
2006	Last Rites of the Dead	Angela's Boss	
2007	Life Unkind	Amelia	Short film
2007	The Dread	Teri	
2008	Love Sick: Secrets of a Sex Addict	Sue Silverman	Television film
2008	My Best Friend's Girl	Courtney	
2013	The Barter System	Jenna	Short film
2013	Speed Queen	Jenna	Short film
2014	Ladies on Top	Cassie Bieber	Also writer and producer
2015	400 Days	Darla	

=== Television ===
Year	Title	Role	Notes
2006	Shark	Deena Brock	Episode: "Pilot"
2007	Criminal Minds	Chrissy Wilkinson	Episode: "Birthright"
2007–2012, 2013	Army Wives	Roxy LeBlanc	Series regular (season 1-6), Special Guest Star (season 7), 105 episodes
2008	The New Adventures of Old Christine	Melanie	Episode: "Between a Rock and a Hard Place"
2011	Man Up	Kelly	Episode: "Camping"
2013	Joe, Joe & Jane	Jane Waxman	TV pilot
2013	Scandal	Candace Marcus	Recurring role, 3 episodes
2014	Person of Interest	Holly	Episode: "4C"
2014	Grey's Anatomy	Young Ellis Grey	Episodes: "I Must Have Lost It on the Wind" and "Only Mama Knows"
2014	Once Upon a Time	Helga	Episode: "The Snow Queen"
2015	Major Crimes	Gretchen Tucker	Episode: "Wish You Were Here"
2016	Girls	Coco	Episode: "Queen for Two Days"
2016	The Catch	Stephanie Duncan	Episodes: "The Happy Couple" and "The Wedding"
2016	Pure Genius	Suzie	Episode: "You Must Remember This"
2017	9JKL	Christina	Episode: "Pilot"
2017	iZombie	Tori Sutcliffe	Episode: "Zombie Knows Best"
2018	Reverie	Holly Maxwell	Episode: “Pas De Deux”
2018	13 Reasons Why	Chloe's mother	Episode: “Bryce and Chloe”
2016, 2018	Younger	Malkie	Recurring role, 6 episodes
2018-2021	Good Girls	Nancy	Recurring role seasons 1-2; guest role seasons 3-4, 10 episodes
2020	One Day at a Time	Nurse Sasha	Episode: "Checking Boxes"
2021	I Think You Should Leave with Tim Robinson	Janeane	Episode: "Everyone just needs to be more in the moment."
2021	Acapulco	Mrs. Bennett	Episode: "Pilot"
2021	Just Beyond	Brook	Episode: "My Monster"
