= James Pickens Jr. =

American actor (born 1954)

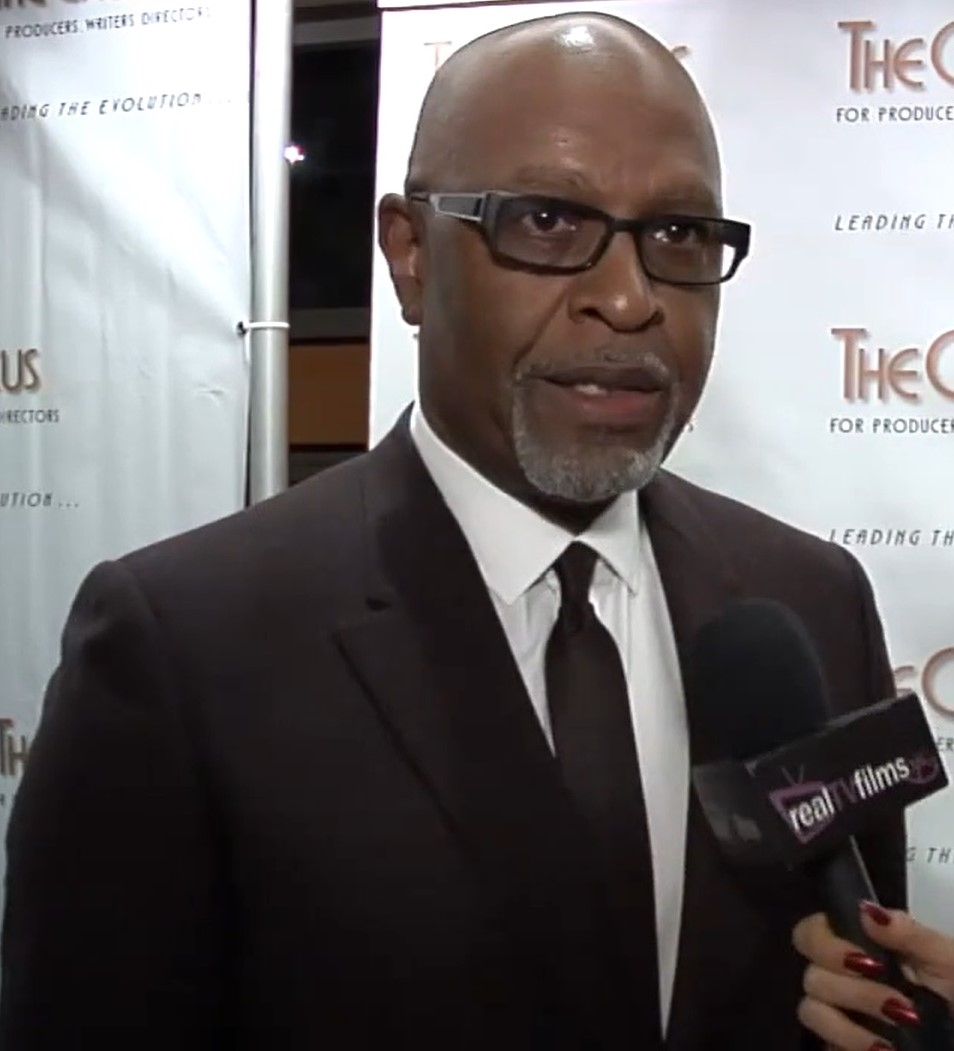
- Pickens interviewed by RealTVFilms in 2016
- Born: October 26, 1954 (age 71); Cleveland, Ohio, U.S.
- Occupation: Actor
- Years active: 1981–present
- Spouse: Gina Taylor (m. 1984)
- Children: 2

James Pickens Jr. (born October 26, 1954) is an American actor. He is best known for his starring role as Dr. Richard Webber on the ABC medical drama television series Grey's Anatomy (since 2005), and for his supporting roles as Deputy Director Alvin Kersh on later seasons of the Fox Network science fiction series The X-Files and Chuck Mitchell on Roseanne (1990–96; 2018) and The Conners (2018–22).

== Early life and education ==
Pickens was born in Cleveland, Ohio. He began acting as a student at Bowling Green State University. His first acting role was in a campus production of Matters of Choice by Chuck Gordone. Pickens earned his Bachelor of Fine Arts degree from BGSU in 1976.

== Career ==
Pickens started his professional acting career at the Roundabout Theatre in New York City playing Walter Lee in A Raisin in the Sun. In 1981, Pickens performed in the Negro Ensemble Company's production of A Soldier's Play, starring alongside Denzel Washington and Samuel L. Jackson.

In 1986, Pickens began his TV career playing Zack Edwards on the soap opera Another World from 1986 to 1990. He went on to have recurring roles on The X-Files as Deputy Director Kersh, Curb Your Enthusiasm, The West Wing, Roseanne, Beverly Hills, 90210, JAG, and Six Feet Under. He also served a role in 42. In 1997, Pickens played the role of Stevens, head of NASA, in Disney’s comedy Rocket Man.

In 2002, Pickens had a cameo appearance as the male zoo doctor in the film Red Dragon.

In 2005, Pickens was chosen to play Dr. Richard Webber on the ABC medical drama Grey's Anatomy.

In the February 28, 2007 all-star benefit reading of "The Gift of Peace" at UCLA's Freud Playhouse, he portrayed a man whose life experiences led him to volunteer in the peace movement. He played alongside actors Ed Asner, Barbara Bain, Amy Brenneman, George Coe, and Wendie Malick. The play was an open appeal and fundraiser for passage of U.S. House Resolution 808, which sought to establish a Cabinet-level "Department of Peace" in the U.S. government, to be funded by a two-percent diversion of the Pentagon's annual budget.

In 2018, Pickens has reprised his role as Chuckie Mitchell in two episodes of the tenth season revival of Roseanne. In 2019, he was inducted into the National Multicultural Western Heritage Museum.

== Personal life ==
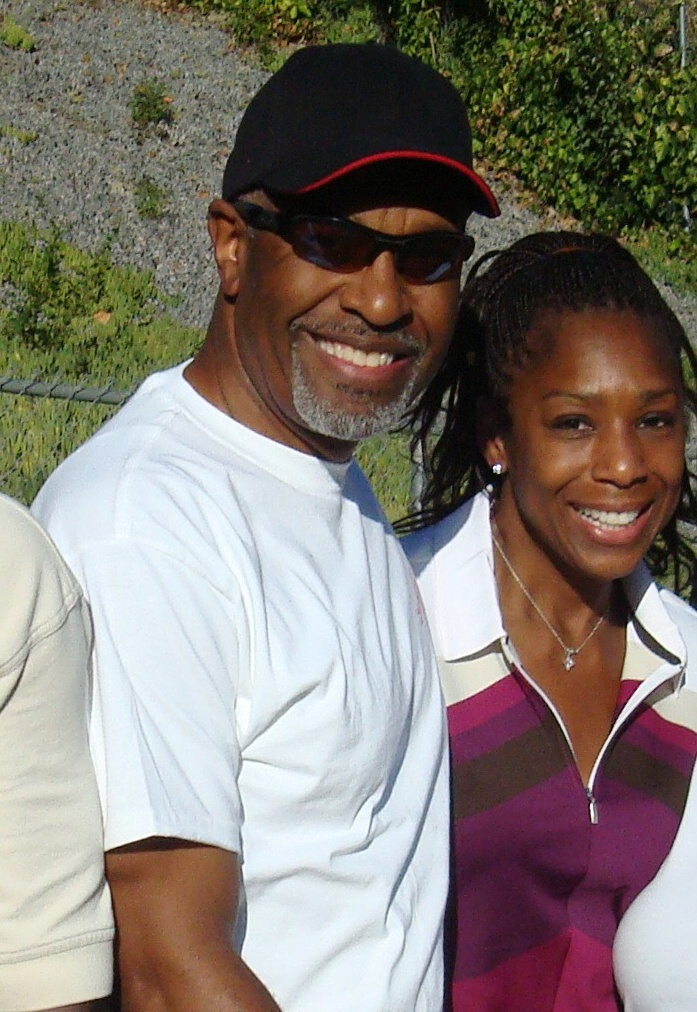
Pickens (left) in 2007

Pickens married Gina Taylor, a former member of Musique, on May 27, 1984 and has two children. In his spare time Pickens can be found horseback riding and roping cattle. He is a member of the United States Team Roping Championship and competes in roping events across the country. He owns an American Quarter Horse named Smokey.

James's two children, Carl Pickens and Gavyn Pickens, are both pursuing careers in show business. His son Carl is working on a Hip-Hop career and can be seen in various television appearances, including Hangin' with Mr. Cooper where he appeared alongside his long-time friend Omar Gooding. His father James Pickens Sr. worked for the City of Cleveland.

In November 2025, Pickens announced he was diagnosed with prostate cancer. Later that same month, he announced he was cancer-free.

== Filmography ==
=== Film ===
Year	Title	Role	Notes
1986	F/X	Ambulance Driver	
1987	Hotshot	James Pickens	
1992	Trespass	Police Officer Reese	
1993	Boiling Point	Prison Officer	
1993	Menace II Society	Man	
1994	Hostile Intentions	Capt. Connor	
1994	Jimmy Hollywood	Cook	
1995	Dead Presidents	Mr. Curtis	
1995	Nixon	Black Orator	
1996	Power 98	Det. Wilkinson	
1996	Sleepers	Guard Marlboro	
1996	Ghosts of Mississippi	Medgar Evers	
1997	Gridlock'd	Supervisor	
1997	RocketMan	Ben Stevens	
1998	Sphere	O.S.S.A. Instructor	
1998	Bulworth	Uncle David	
1998	How Stella Got Her Groove Back	Walter Payne	
1999	Liberty Heights	Sylvia's Father	
2000	Traffic	Ben Williams	
2002	Red Dragon	Male Zoo Doctor	Uncredited
2002	Home Room	Principal Robbins	
2003	White Rush	Denny	
2005	Venom	Sheriff	
2008	Ball Don't Lie	Roberto	
2010	Just Wright	Lloyd Wright	
2013	42	Mr. Brock	

=== Television ===
Year	Title	Role	Notes
1983-1984	Saturday Night Live	Texxon commercial guy unemployed Vietnam veteran in Texxon Oil commercial (uncredited)	2 episodes
1986–1990	Another World	Zack Edwards	112 episodes
1990–1996; 2018	Roseanne	Chuck Mitchell	21 episodes
1991–1992	Beverly Hills, 90210	Henry Thomas	10 episodes
1992	Blossom	Vinnie	Episode: "The Letter"
1992	Parker Lewis Can't Lose	Fred	Episode: "Hungry Heart"
1992	L.A. Law	Joseph Russell	Episode: "Zo Long"
1992	Doogie Howser, M.D.	Bert	Episode: "Roommate with a View"
1992	Exclusive	Jonathan Heglin	Television film
1993	NYPD Blue	Nathan	Episode: "Personal Foul"
1993	Murder, She Wrote	Sonny Greene	Episode: "The Survivor"
1994	Renegade	Lieutenant Pete Calloway	Episode: "Hostage"
1994	Coach	Rick Williams	Episode: "Blue Chip Blues"
1994	Me and the Boys	Coach Brown	Episode: "Black Dads Can't Jump"
1994	Sodbusters	Isaac	Television film
1994	A Child's Cry for Help	Brad Currie	Television film
1994	Lily in Winter	Chick	Television film
1995	Trail by Fire		Television film
1995	Sharon's Secret	Ashmore	Television film
1995	Touched by an Angel	George	Episode: "The Driver"
1996	In the House	Russell	Episode: "My Crazy Valentine"
1996	The Lazarus Man	Eliah Robinson	Episode: "The Conspirator"
1996	One West Waikiki	Tom Breason	Episode: "Allergic to Golf"
1996	Dangerous Minds	Coach Butch Kelly	Episode: "Moonstruck"
1996	Bloodhounds	Agent John DeGraf	Television film
1996–1997	Something So Right	Jim	5 episodes
1997	Pacific Palisades	Josh Smith	Episode: "Past & Present Danger"
1997	Walker, Texas Ranger	Staff Sergeant Luther Parrish	Episode: "The Fighting McLains"
1997–1998	Brooklyn South	Detective	4 episodes
1997–2000	The Practice	Detective Mike McKrew	15 episodes
1998	The Pretender	Clark Thomas	Episode: "Crash"
1998	Seinfeld	Detective Hudson	Episode: "The Finale"
1998	Little Girl Fly Away	Detective Walter Engelhart	Television film
1998–2000	Any Day Now	Judge Lucius Pearl	3 episodes
1998–2002; 2018	The X-Files	FBI Assistant / Deputy Director Alvin Kersh	20 episodes Nominated—Screen Actors Guild Award for Outstanding Performance by an Ensemble in a Drama Series
1999	Vengeance Unlimited	Mr. Hobbs	Episode: "Friends"
1999	JAG	Commander Wallace Burke	2 episodes
1999	A Slight Case of Murder	Det. Larry Gray	Television film
2000	City of Angels	Wilson Patterson	3 episodes
2000	Daddio	Doug Grayson	Episode: "The Premium Also Rises"
2000	The District	Mr. Lane	Episode: "The Real Terrorist"
2000	Family Law	—N/a	Episode: "Family Values"
2000	NYPD Blue	Lt. Joe Abner	3 episodes
2001	Semper Fi	Mr. Maddox	Television film
2001–2002	Philly	Clyde Coleman	7 episodes
2002	Strong Medicine	Dr. Everett Sloane	Episode: "Outcomes"
2002	Crossing Jordan	Agent Hawkins	Episode: "Bombs Away"
2002	MDs	Mr. Farrell	Episode: "Cruel and Unusual"
2002–2003	Six Feet Under	Roderick Charles	2 episodes
2002–2003	Becker	Cliff Bennett	2 episodes
2003	CSI: Miami	Prison Warden	Episode: "Body Count"
2003	The Lyon's Den	Terrance Christianson	3 episodes
2004	Line of Fire	Kenneth Stevens	Episode: "The Senator"
2004	The West Wing	Mayor	Episode: "Full Disclosure"
2004	Jack & Bobby	Marcus Ride	Episode: "Pilot"
2005	Curb Your Enthusiasm	Doctor	2 episodes
2005–present	Grey's Anatomy	Dr. Richard Webber	450 episodes NAACP Image Award for Outstanding Supporting Actor in a Drama Series; Satellite Award for Best Cast – Television Series; Screen Actors Guild Award for Outstanding Performance by an Ensemble in a Drama Series; Nominated—Golden Nymph Award for Outstanding Actor in a Drama Series; Nominated—NAACP Image Award for Outstanding Actor in a Drama Series; Nominated—NAACP Image Award for Outstanding Supporting Actor in a Drama Series (2006–11); Nominated—Screen Actors Guild Award for Outstanding Performance by an Ensemble in a Drama Series (2006, 2008)
2020–2024	Station 19	Dr. Richard Webber	6 episodes
2007–2009	Private Practice	Dr. Richard Webber	2 episodes
2010	Seattle Grace: Message of Hope	Dr. Richard Webber	6 episodes
2018	Grey's Anatomy: B-Team	Dr. Richard Webber	1 episode
2018	Yellowstone	Old Cowboy	Episode: "The Unravelling, Pt. 2"
2018–2022	The Conners	Chuck Mitchell	9 episodes
2022–2023	The Proud Family: Louder and Prouder	Charles (voice)	2 episodes

=== Video games ===
Year	Title	Role	Notes
2004	The X-Files: Resist or Serve	Deputy Director Alvin Kersh	
