= Kelly McCreary =

American actress

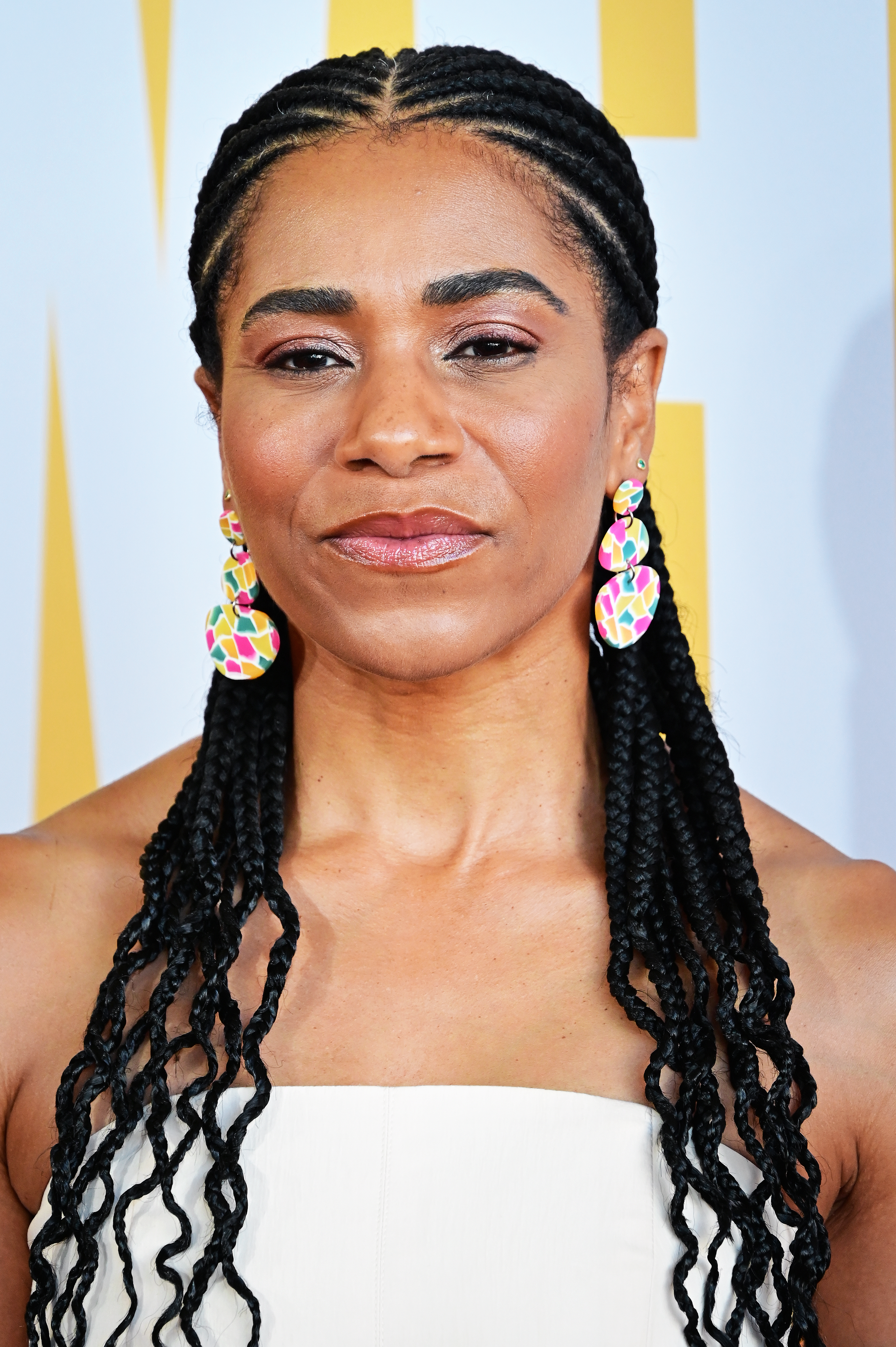
- McCreary in 2026
- Born: Kelly McCreary; September 29, 1981 (age 45); Milwaukee, Wisconsin, U.S.
- Education: Barnard College
- Occupation: Actress
- Years active: 2004–present
- Spouse: Pete Chatmon (m. 2019)
- Children: 1

Kelly J. McCreary (born September 29, 1981) is an American actress, best known for her role on the ABC drama series Grey's Anatomy as Dr. Maggie Pierce, the half-sister of series protagonist Meredith Grey. She joined the series as a guest at the end of the tenth season, becoming a series regular in the eleventh season. She has reprised her role on the spin-off series Station 19.

McCreary began her career acting in theatre, eventually making it to Broadway, and has performed in a number of productions by playwright Dominique Morisseau. She made her screen debut doing voice work for several animated children's educational programs, and later made guest appearances on the television series Rubicon, I Just Want My Pants Back, and Castle, with multi-episode arcs on White Collar and Scandal. She has appeared in the films Being Flynn (2011) and Life (2015). McCreary was a series regular on The CW's short-lived medical drama Emily Owens, M.D. as Tyra Dupre.

== Early life and education ==
McCreary was born in Milwaukee, Wisconsin on September 29, 1981, to Mary and Geoffrey McCreary. She has two sisters and one brother. She became interested in acting and theatre in the fourth grade and attended middle and high schools for the arts. McCreary first appeared on stage in a sixth-grade musical. At age 17, she moved to New York City to study acting at Barnard College, a women's college of Columbia University. She appeared in several productions at the Minor Latham Playhouse, and worked on Columbia's Varsity Show during her junior year. She also spent a semester at the British American Drama Academy in London and appeared in numerous commercials before graduating from Barnard in 2003. McCreary has also trained at the Chautauqua Conservatory Theatre Company and The Actor's Center in New York.

== Career ==
Following her graduation from Barnard College, McCreary lived in Harlem and worked part-time at Barnard's alumnae affairs office while she continued to go on auditions and perform in plays. Frustrated with a lack of success in television and film at that point, as well as disappointment with her stage work, McCreary effectively quit acting and moved to Spain, where she worked on a farm. However, she returned to performing when Dominique Morisseau's play Follow Me to Nellie's, which McCreary had previously workshopped, scored a production. McCreary later reflected, "In that tough time, before I quit acting, that was one of the few creative things that had made me really happy. And then it was getting a production. So I was, like, I will totally go back to do this. I may never do anything again after it. But I know I'm going to have a great time: I love these people, and I love this play." McCreary played the role of Na Rose.

In 2005, McCreary made her screen debut on the PBS animated series Cyberchase, and later appeared on another animated PBS series, The Electric Company. She made her Broadway debut in the 2008 musical Passing Strange. McCreary also had a recurring role on the USA Network series White Collar. In 2010, she landed a starring role in the Off-Broadway musical comedy Perfect Harmony. She made her film debut with a small role in the 2011 feature Being Flynn as Inez. In 2012, she was cast in the first major role of her career, on The CW medical series Emily Owens, M.D., opposite Mamie Gummer and Aja Naomi King, playing the role of Tyra Dupre, a first-year surgical intern who is also a lesbian. However, the series was cancelled after one season. McCreary has additionally appeared on the television series Castle, I Just Want My Pants Back, and Rubicon. She played the role of Eartha Kitt in the indie film Life opposite Dane DeHaan and Robert Pattinson, and also had roles in the films Baby Baby Baby and How to Follow Strangers. Her other stage credits include Secret Order with the Merrimack Repertory Theater, and A Midsummer Night's Dream and Eurydice with the Williamstown Theatre Festival.

In 2014, after guest-starring in two episodes of the Shonda Rhimes political drama Scandal as Clare Tucker, McCreary joined Rhimes' other ABC drama series, Grey's Anatomy. McCreary debuted in the penultimate episode of the medical drama's tenth season titled "Everything I Try to Do, Nothing Seems to Turn Out Right" in the role of Dr. Maggie Pierce, the half-sister of series protagonist Meredith Grey (Ellen Pompeo). She continued to recur on the series and after appearing in four episodes of the series' eleventh season, McCreary was promoted to series regular status on October 23, 2014. McCreary has reprised her role in the spin-off series Station 19, appearing in the crossover episodes "Under the Surface" and "Always Ready" from the second season, "I'll Be Seeing You" from the third season, and "We Build Then We Break" from the sixth season.

During her Grey's Anatomy hiatus in 2017, McCreary played Esther Mills in a production of the play Intimate Apparel. In 2018, McCreary booked one of the lead roles in the Netflix animated series Harvey Street Kids, where she voices the character Dot. The series premiered on June 29, 2018. A second season retitled Harvey Girls Forever! was released on May 10, 2019. In 2018, McCreary also produced a short film titled A Cohort of Guests featuring several of her co-stars from Grey's Anatomy and Station 19, and reunited with Morisseau to star as Shanita in the Geffen Playhouse production of the playwright's Skeleton Crew.

On March 17, 2023, it was reported McCreary, who joined Grey's Anatomy in the tenth series as Dr. Maggie Pierce, would be departing as a series regular following the fourteenth episode of the nineteenth season, "Shadow of Your Love", airing on April 13, 2023. It was also announced she would be appearing in the final episode of the season, similar to Pompeo, with this marking her last appearance as a series regular.

== Personal life ==
McCreary resides in Los Angeles, California.

While living in New York City, McCreary co-founded the Jaradoa Theater Company, an organization committed to community outreach. She is an associate member of IAMA Theater in Los Angeles and an associate artist with The Civilians, a theater company that "creates new work based on creative investigation into vital questions of the present." In 2015, she became a member of the Equal Justice Society Board of Directors.

In 2018, McCreary participated in former First Lady Michelle Obama's When We All Vote campaign, serving as an ambassador. The campaign aimed to increase voter turnout in the United States by encouraging citizens to register to vote in preparation for the upcoming midterm elections.

In January 2019, McCreary revealed that she and director Pete Chatmon were engaged after meeting on the set of Grey's Anatomy two years prior. They married on May 4, 2019. On August 16, 2021, McCreary and Chatmon announced that they are expecting their first child. She gave birth to her daughter several weeks later on October 3, 2021.

== Filmography ==
=== Film ===
Year	Title	Role	Notes
2012	Being Flynn	Inez	
2013	How to Follow Strangers	Claire	
2015	Life	Eartha Kitt	
2015	Baby, Baby, Baby	Jo	
2017	The Middlegame	Eva	Short
2019	A Cohort of Guests	Jasmine	Short
2022	88	Veronica Verton	

=== Television ===
Year	Title	Role	Notes
2004–2010	Cyberchase	Kelly	Recurring cast: seasons 3-8
2009	The Electric Company	Bride	Episode: "Scrambled Brains"
2009–2011	White Collar	Yvonne	Recurring cast: season 2, guest: season 3
2010	The Onion News Network	Alex Heyward	Episode: "Obama Caught Lip-Syncing Speech"
2010	Rubicon	Judith	Episode: "A Good Day's Work"
2012	I Just Want My Pants Back	Kerry	Episode: "Baby Monkeys"
2012	My America	The Witness	Episode: "Hit and Run"
2012–2013	Emily Owens, M.D.	Tyra Dupre	Main cast
2013–2014	Scandal	Clare Tucker	Episode: "YOLO" & "The Fluffer"
2014	Castle	Kelly Jane	Episode: "Limelight"
2014–2025	Grey's Anatomy	Dr. Maggie Pierce	Guest role (seasons 10, 20 and 22); Main cast (seasons 11-19); 195 episodes
2018–2020	Harvey Street Kids	Dot (voice)	Main cast
2018–2023	Station 19	Dr. Maggie Pierce	Guest cast: seasons 2, 3 & 6;
