= Sledgehammer (Grey's Anatomy) =

- Grey's Anatomy episode
- Meredith Grey (Ellen Pompeo) discovering Amelia Shepherd (Caterina Scorsone) breaking down the wall with a sledgehammer.
- Episode no.: Season 12; Episode 1
- Directed by: Kevin McKidd
- Written by: Stacy McKee
- Original air date: September 24, 2015
- Running time: 43 minutes

Guest appearances
- Joey Lauren Adams as Dr. Tracy McConnell; Eric Lange as Steven Tanner; Maz Jobrani as Dakhir Hamed; Jenny Cooper as Bethany Tanner; Mandalynn Carlson as Jessica Tanner; Debbie Allen as Dr. Catherine Avery

Episode chronology
← Previous "You're My Home"	Next → "Walking Tall"
- Grey's Anatomy season 12

"Sledgehammer" is the first episode and the season premiere of the twelfth season of the American television medical drama Grey's Anatomy, and the 246th episode overall. Written by Stacy McKee and directed by Kevin McKidd, the episode aired on the American Broadcasting Company (ABC) in the United States on September 24, 2015.

The episode focuses on Meredith Grey (Ellen Pompeo) adjusting to her new life after the death of her husband Derek Shepherd (Patrick Dempsey), now living with her half-sister, Maggie Pierce (Kelly McCreary), and sister-in-law, Amelia Shepherd (Caterina Scorsone). Other storylines include Miranda Bailey (Chandra Wilson) vying for the position of Chief of Surgery with the support of Richard Webber (James Pickens Jr.), and Arizona Robbins (Jessica Capshaw) searching for a new roommate after her split from Callie Torres (Sara Ramirez). Additionally, relationship tensions rise for couples Alex Karev (Justin Chambers) and Jo Wilson (Camilla Luddington), as well as Jackson Avery (Jesse Williams) and April Kepner (Sarah Drew).

Upon its initial broadcast, "Sledgehammer" was watched by 9.55 million viewers in the United States, receiving a 2.8/10 Nielsen rating in the 18–49 demographic, ranking #22 in overall viewership and #14 in the key demographic. It was the 4th most-watched drama of the night. The episode received positive reviews, with critics praising its return to familiar themes from earlier seasons.

== Plot ==
The episode opens with a voice-over narration from Meredith Grey (Ellen Pompeo) about letting go of the past and embracing a fresh perspective on the familiar.

Three months have passed since the wedding of Richard Webber (James Pickens Jr.) and Catherine Avery (Debbie Allen).

Meredith Grey (Ellen Pompeo) moves back into her old home and must adjust to living with her half-sister Maggie Pierce (Kelly McCreary) and sister-in-law Amelia Shepherd (Caterina Scorsone). Amelia begins tearing down a wall with a sledgehammer, sparking tension between her and Meredith, while Maggie finds herself caught in the middle, attempting to mediate between the two.

At Grey-Sloan Memorial, two teenage girls who were injured in a train accident reveal their romantic relationship, despite their parents' disapproval. Callie Torres (Sara Ramirez) advocates for the girls, while Maggie becomes involved in the conflict by punching one of the mothers during a heated exchange. As the girls recover, their fathers bond and come to accept their daughters' relationship, with one threatening to divorce his wife if she doesn’t learn to accept their daughter’s relationship.

Alex Karev (Justin Chambers) and Maggie bond over stories of being bullied, with Jo Wilson (Camilla Luddington) and Callie respectively, Arizona Robbins (Jessica Capshaw), following her separation from Callie, tries to rent out part of her house. After learning from Stephanie Edwards (Jerrika Hinton) why no one wants to live with her, she reluctantly agrees to take in intern Andrew DeLuca (Giacomo Gianniotti) as her roommate.

Miranda Bailey (Chandra Wilson) competes for the position of Chief of Surgery against Tracy McConnell (Joey Lauren Adams). Initially discouraged by McConnell's impressive resume, Bailey is convinced by her husband Ben Warren (Jason George) to remain in the race. She eventually wins the position after delivering a compelling mid-surgery presentation to the hospital board. April Kepner (Sarah Drew) returns from a three-month deployment in Jordan, but her reunion with her husband, Jackson Avery (Jesse Williams), is cold and distant.

Meredith takes up teaching a new anatomy class and instructs the interns to forget everything they know about "anatomy" and approach their education with a fresh perspective. They all make the first incisions on the cadavers under her supervision.

Owen Hunt (Kevin McKidd) drops Amelia off at Meredith's place, kissing her just before Maggie pulls her inside. Maggie encourages Meredith and Amelia to reconcile, and with her support, they symbolically bring down the wall in their home, signifying a new chapter in their lives.

== Production ==
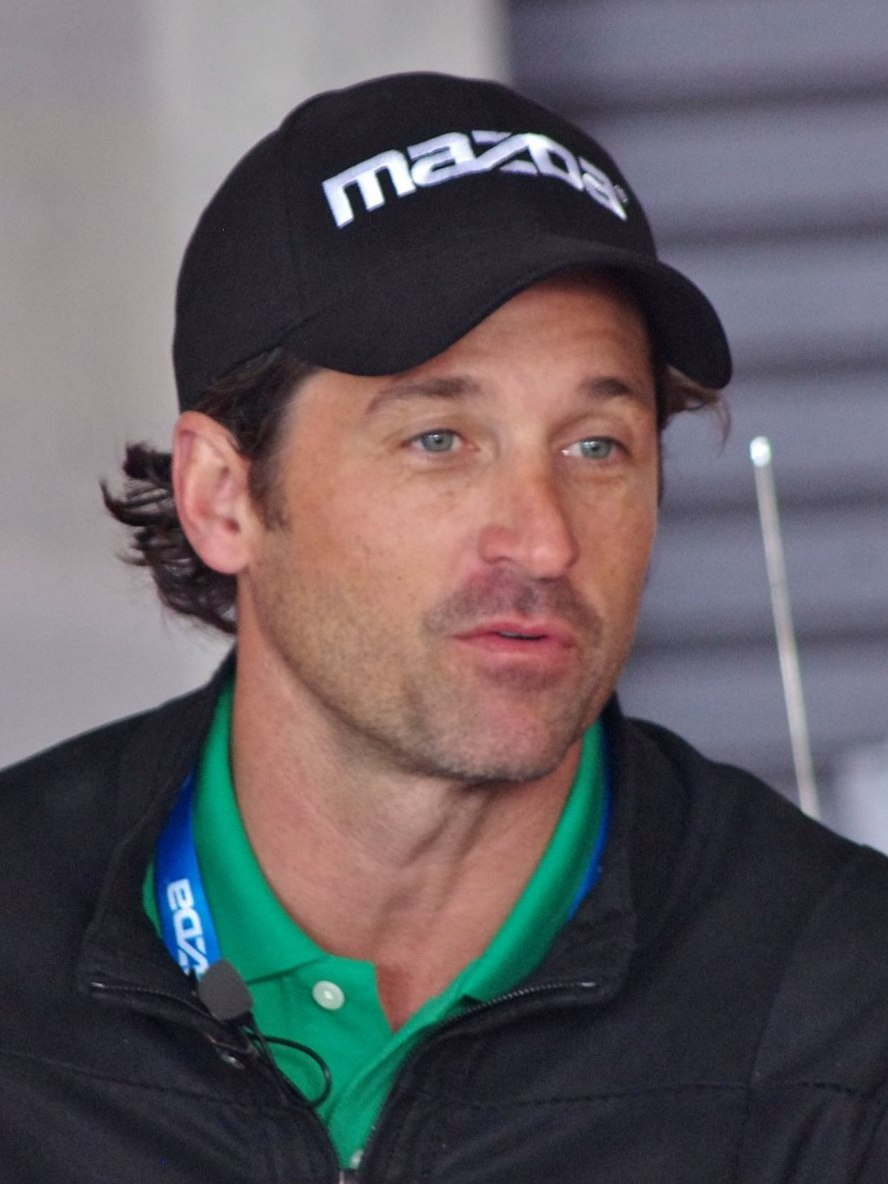
The season was the first to air without Patrick Dempsey as Derek Shepherd, following the death of his character in the previous season

The twelfth-season premiere of Grey's Anatomy marked the first episode not feature Patrick Dempsey as a series regular post his departure in Season 11. Series creator Shonda Rhimes addressed Dempsey's absence in an interview, commenting on the audience's response: “It was interesting for me to discover that audiences, especially women, are so conditioned to believe that there's a singular fairy tale, that nobody stops to think that that might not be the definition of happiness." Rhimes elaborated, saying that Meredith Grey (Ellen Pompeo) had already realized this, particularly when she said, "I can live without you, but I don't want to," a statement Rhimes described as powerful for any woman: "You complement me, but you don't complete me."

The American Broadcasting Company (ABC) also reimagined the series without its iconic character, "Derek "McDreamy" Shepherd", with the network's president expressing hope that the show could continue for many more years after Dempsey's departure. In an interview with Entertainment Weekly, Pompeo echoed similar sentiments about the future of the show without Dempsey. She stated that Grey's Anatomy would succeed and that Meredith didn't need a partner to be a compelling lead. Comparing Meredith to other strong female leads in Shondaland series, such as Scandal's Olivia Pope and How to Get Away with Murder's Annalise Keating, Pompeo questioned why Meredith couldn't lead the show on her own, asking, "Why can't I be on that poster by myself?"

It was also revealed that Joey Lauren Adams would guest star in the upcoming season, competing with Miranda Bailey (Chandra Wilson) for the role of Chief of Surgery. This storyline was set up in the Season 11 finale, where it was disclosed that Catherine Avery (Debbie Allen) had selected a candidate to challenge Bailey. Adams' casting was announced by ABC through Entertainment Weekly. Additionally, Eric Lange, Maz Jobrani and Jenny Cooper co-starred in a patient storyline involving two young girls who attempt suicide.

== Release ==
"Sledgehammer" was originally broadcast on September 24, 2015, in the United States on the American Broadcasting Company (ABC). Upon its initial release, the episode was watched by a total of 9.55 million viewers, a slight decline from the previous season premiere, "I Must Have Lost it on the Wind", which was watched by 9.81 million viewers. However, it marked an increase from the preceding episode, "You're My Home", which garnered 8.33 million viewers. In the key 18–49 demographic, the episode scored a 2.8/10 in Nielsen ratings, ranking 22nd in overall viewership and 14th in the 18–49 demographics. The premiere episode was also ranked as the 4th most-watched drama of the night.

== Reception ==
"Sledgehammer" received positive reviews from television critics upon telecast, with many praising the show's return to form and noting that it recaptured the tone and style of the earlier seasons. Critics appreciated the direction the show had taken, emphasizing its familiar elements while introducing fresh dynamics.

Ashley Bissette Sumerel from TV Fanatic awarded the episode a 4.5/5.0, praising it for returning to the show's roots. Sumerel particularly highlighted the storyline about two girls falling in love, noting, "This is the sort of thing that makes Grey's Anatomy great. It doesn't hold back when it tackles subjects like bullying and homophobia".

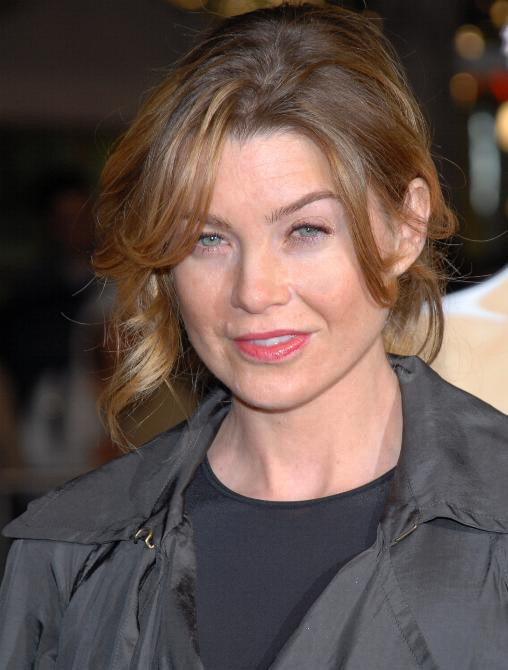
Critics including Alex Hawkins of Western Gazette highlighted Ellen Pompeo's (Meredith Grey) due for an Primetime Emmy Award.

Western Gazette also commended the episode, stating, "Within the first few minutes of the new episode, it's clear that Grey's Anatomy is returning to its roots. Overall, the first episode was a pleasant surprise and it was refreshing to see Rhimes head in a new direction." The review added that without Derek, Meredith finally received the spotlight she deserved. The site noted, "It's time for Ellen Pompeo (Meredith Grey) to finally win an Emmy".

Entertainment Weekly offered further praise, stating, "Take a deep breath. Just kidding, you don't really need to, because that episode was fun." They praised the tackling of bullying and applauded the relevance of the storyline. Additionally, the publication celebrated Pompeo's performance, particularly noting Meredith's humorous line: "That sounds like something tequila would say." The absence of Patrick Dempsey (Derek Shepherd) was addressed with optimism, saying, "This episode proved that, like Meredith said, we can live without him. Life continues on death, and so does television. So welcome back, Grey's, and thanks for reminding us that life does indeed go on".

TVEquals described the episode as a "tear-jerker", stating, "Overall, this was a great start to Season 12. I actually feel a bit on edge, as I wonder who among this group will have to endure heartache this season." The site praised Grey's Anatomy for embracing diversity and telling important LGBTQ stories.

Zap2it also highlighted the emotional power of the love story between the two young girls, while TVOM praised Pompeo's character, remarking, "The show's titular heroine had to learn to move forward with her life, and based on the season premiere, we would be wise to stick around for the journey." They concluded by noting the show's "strong, steady pulse" despite Derek's absence.

Nad's Reviews provided a mixed-to-positive review, describing the episode as "fun, goofy material" that "managed to force a smile" but felt "old" and predictable. The site also praised Pompeo, though it commented that Meredith no longer seems to drive the show. Positive notes were also made about Debbie Allen (Catherine Avery) and Chandra Wilson's (Miranda Bailey) performances.
