= Things We Lost in the Fire (Grey's Anatomy) =

- Grey's Anatomy episode
- Episode no.: Season 12; Episode 8
- Directed by: Rob Corn
- Written by: Tia Napolitano
- Original air date: November 19, 2015
- Running time: 43 minutes

Guest appearance
- Samantha Sloyan as Dr. Penelope Blake

Episode chronology
← Previous "Something Against You"	Next → "The Sound of Silence"
- Grey's Anatomy season 12

"Things We Lost in the Fire" is the eighth episode of the twelfth season of the American television medical drama Grey's Anatomy, and the 253rd episode overall. Written by Tia Napolitano and directed by Rob Corn, the episode aired on the ABC in the United States on November 19, 2015.

The episode focuses on the aftermath of a massive wildfire, as several firefighters with life-threatening injuries are admitted to Grey Sloan Memorial Hospital. Tensions rise between Owen Hunt (Kevin McKidd) and Nathan Riggs (Martin Henderson), as their mysterious past begins to surface. Meanwhile, Meredith Grey (Ellen Pompeo) continues to navigate her new role as Head of General Surgery, while dealing with professional challenges and personal dilemmas. Jo Wilson (Camilla Luddington) faces relationship issues with Alex Karev (Justin Chambers), as the couple struggles with their differing views on their future.

Upon its initial airing, "Things We Lost in the Fire" was watched by 8.50 million viewers, and garnered positive reviews from television critics, with praise for the performances of McKidd and Henderson.

== Plot ==
The episode opens with a voice-over narration from Meredith Grey (Ellen Pompeo), reflecting on the unpredictability of controlling dangerous situations.

As rumors spread about Owen Hunt's (Kevin McKidd) connection to Nathan Riggs (Martin Henderson), a massive wildfire send a wave of patients to Grey Sloan Memorial, including Owen's mother, Evelyn (Debra Mooney)'s boyfriend, John Finch (Drew Rausch). Meredith and Amelia Shepherd (Caterina Scorsone) continue to clash when Amelia learns that Owen has been confiding in Meredith instead of her. Their fight escalates until Meredith demands that Amelia move out of her house. Meanwhile, Alex Karev (Justin Chambers) and Jo Wilson (Camilla Luddington) hit a rough patch as Jo feels that Alex is prioritizing Meredith over her, only to discover that Alex has been planning a marriage proposal with Meredith's help. Jo also reconciles with Stephanie Edwards (Jerrika Hinton), and they renew their friendship.

At the same time, Andrew DeLuca (Giacomo Gianniotti) expresses his feelings for Maggie Pierce (Kelly McCreary) but struggles with her overly professional behavior toward him at work. After an intimate encounter, Jackson Avery (Jesse Williams) and April Kepner (Sarah Drew) find themselves drifting further apart, eventually facing the inevitable breakdown of their relationship. Arizona Robbins (Jessica Capshaw) continues to navigate the challenges of dating.

Following another heated argument with Owen, Nathan heads to Joe's Bar, where he encounters a distraught Amelia. Unaware of her history with addiction, Nathan offers to buy her a drink, and she accepts. Meanwhile, Meredith has a conversation with Evelyn and uncovers a surprising revelation about Owen: he once had a sister.

== Release ==
"Things We Lost in the Fire" was originally broadcast on October 8, 2015, in the United States on the American Broadcasting Company (ABC), and was viewed by 8.50 million viewers.

== Reception ==
"Things We Lost in the Fire" received positive reviews from television critics upon telecast, with praise for the performances of Kevin McKidd (Owen Hunt) and Martin Henderson (Nathan Riggs).
