= Something Against You (Grey's Anatomy) =

- Grey's Anatomy episode
- Episode no.: Season 12; Episode 7
- Directed by: Geary McLeod
- Written by: Andy Reaser
- Original air date: November 12, 2015
- Running time: 43 minutes

Guest appearances
- Giacomo Gianniotti as Dr. Andrew DeLuca; Samantha Sloyan as Dr. Penelope Blake

Episode chronology
← Previous "The Me Nobody Knows"	Next → "Things We Lost in the Fire"
- Grey's Anatomy season 12

"Something Against You" is the seventh episode of the twelfth season of the American television medical drama Grey's Anatomy, and the 252nd episode overall. Written by Andy Reaser and directed by Geary McLeod, the episode aired on the American Broadcasting Company (ABC) in the United States on November 12, 2015.

The episode centers on Meredith Grey (Ellen Pompeo) and Jo Wilson (Camilla Luddington) as they struggle to assist a long-term patient in need of a transplant. Tensions rise between Callie Torres (Sara Ramirez) and Meredith, as Callie's professional judgment becomes clouded by her personal feelings for Penelope "Penny" Blake (Samantha Sloyan). Meanwhile, Jackson Avery (Jesse Williams) and April Kepner (Sarah Drew) attempt to repair their fractured marriage, and Maggie Pierce (Kelly McCreary) faces difficulties working with new cardiothoracic attending Nathan Riggs (Martin Henderson). Additionally, Alex Karev (Justin Chambers) teaches the interns about “doc-knockers”, while Arizona Robbins (Jessica Capshaw) considers re-entering the dating scene. Owen Hunt (Kevin McKidd) grapples with a resurfacing trauma from his past, leading to a PTSD relapse.

Upon its initial airing, "Something Against You" drew an audience of 8.02 million viewers, ranked #7 in viewership, and earned a 2.2/7 rating in the 18–49 demographic. It received mixed reviews from television critics, with praise for the performances of Pompeo, McKidd and James Pickens Jr. (Richard Webber).

== Plot ==
The episode opens with a voice-over narration from Meredith Grey (Ellen Pompeo), emphasizing that vulnerability is not a weakness but an essential part of strength and growth.

Meredith takes Richard Webber’s (James Pickens Jr.) advice about working with Penelope "Penny" Blake (Samantha Sloyan), but she begins going too easy on Penny when a longtime elderly patient arrives for a kidney transplant. During the patient's evaluation, a large osteosarcoma is discovered on his skull, which puts the transplant on hold. However, Jo Wilson (Camilla Luddington) realizes that the kidney donor can also donate part of his skull, effectively removing the cancerous tumor and solving both issues.

Meanwhile, Miranda Bailey (Chandra Wilson) and Ben Warren (Jason George) start arguing over Jackson Avery (Jesse Williams) still living with them. Bailey withholds sex to pressure Ben into kicking Jackson out of their home. Elsewhere, Maggie Pierce (Kelly McCreary) becomes upset upon learning that Bailey hired Nathan Riggs (Martin Henderson), a new cardiothoracic attending, without consulting her. Owen Hunt (Kevin McKidd) is also angered by Riggs' arrival, hinting at a shared and troubled past between the two.

Callie Torres (Sara Ramirez) attempts to confront Meredith about neglecting her responsibility to properly teach Penny, but Penny steps up for herself, asking Callie to let her fight her own battles. She also insists that Meredith be tough on her, so she can learn and grow as a surgeon.

Meanwhile, Alex Karev (Justin Chambers) teaches the interns about “doc-knockers”, and Arizona Robbins (Jessica Capshaw), eager to get back into dating, enlists Richard as her wingman during a trivia night.

== Release ==
"Something Against You" was originally broadcast on November 12, 2015, in the United States on the American Broadcasting Company (ABC). Upon its initial release, the episode was watched by a total of 8.02 million viewers and scored a 2.2/7 in the key 18–49 demographic in the Nielsen ratings, reflecting a decrease from the previous episode, "The Me Nobody Knows", which was viewed by 8.50 million viewers and received a 2.3/8 ratings/share.

== Reception ==
"Something Against You" received mixed reviews from television critics upon telecast, with praise for the performances of Ellen Pompeo (Meredith Grey), Kevin McKidd (Owen Hunt) and James Pickens Jr. (Richard Webber).
