= Time Stops =

- Grey's Anatomy episode
- Episode no.: Season 11; Episode 24
- Directed by: Kevin McKidd
- Written by: Meg Marinis
- Original air date: May 7, 2015
- Running time: 43 minutes

Episode chronology
← Previous "She's Leaving Home"	Next → "You're My Home"
- Grey's Anatomy season 11

"Time Stops" is the 24th episode in the eleventh season of the American television medical drama Grey's Anatomy, and the show's 244th episode overall. Written by Meg Marinis and directed by Kevin McKidd, the episode aired on the American Broadcasting Company (ABC) in the United States on May 7, 2015.

In the episode, a new group of surgical interns joins the hospital's internship program. Meanwhile, it's the wedding day of Richard Webber (James Pickens Jr.) and Catherine Avery (Debbie Allen). Owen Hunt (Kevin McKidd) announces that he has served as Chief of Surgery long enough, prompting Richard to recommend Miranda Bailey (Chandra Wilson) for the position. At the same time, Jackson Avery (Jesse Williams) and April Kepner (Sarah Drew) work on reconciling their marriage while dealing with the crisis of a collapsed tunnel.

Upon its original broadcast, "Time Stops" was watched by 7.74 million viewers, a decrease from the previous episode. In the key 18–49 demographic, it earned a 2.1/8 Nielsen rating, reflecting a 9% and 15% drop from the previous two episodes, respectively. The episode received positive reviews from television critics, with praise directed towards the performances of Drew, Ellen Pompeo (Meredith Grey) and Justin Chambers (Alex Karev).

== Plot ==
The episode opens with a voice-over narration from Meredith Grey (Ellen Pompeo) about facing the fear of stepping out of comfort zones and stepping into an uncertain, challenging world.

As Jackson Avery (Jesse Williams) listens to his mother, Catherine Avery (Debbie Allen), explain how April Kepner (Sarah Drew) has changed since her time in combat, news of a tunnel collapse sends shockwaves through Grey Sloan Memorial Hospital. Multiple victims are rushed in, prompting April, Maggie Pierce (Kelly McCreary), Amelia Shepherd (Caterina Scorsone), and Meredith Grey (Ellen Pompeo) to head to the site to assist in the rescue efforts.

Meanwhile, Richard Webber (James Pickens Jr.), now serving as interim Chief of Surgery after Owen Hunt's (Kevin McKidd) resignation, delivers his famous first-day speech to the new round of interns. However, his personal life takes a hit as his wedding day with Catherine, which starts out promising, quickly descends into chaos when they begin to argue.

At the collapse site, Meredith decides that a critically injured patient cannot be saved, prompting Amelia to confront her about when she knows it's time to give up. Amelia continues to berate Meredith, accusing her of letting Derek Shepherd (Patrick Dempsey) die without calling her for help.

Back at home, Meredith feels unable to stay in the house that Derek built for their family. She asks Alex Karev (Justin Chambers) if she and her children can move in with him and Jo Wilson (Camilla Luddington). Meanwhile, Richard postpones his wedding to Catherine, and Jackson confides in Owen that he and April are struggling to connect since her return from overseas. Alex and Jo hit a rough patch in their relationship, and Maggie receives distressing news from her mother.

In a show of her new resilience, April brings one of the trapped patients, still inside their car, directly to the hospital.

== Release ==
"Time Stops" was originally broadcast on May 7, 2015, at 9:00 PM ET on the American Broadcasting Company (ABC), and was watched by 7.74 million viewers, according to Nielsen ratings. This episode saw a decline in viewership compared to the previous installment, down by 9% and 15% from the two prior episodes, respectively. It scored a 2.1/8 rating in the 18–49 demographic and ranked lower in viewership compared to earlier episodes in the season.

== Reception ==
"Time Stops" received positive reviews from television critics, with praise directed towards the performances of Sarah Drew (April Kepner), Ellen Pompeo (Meredith Grey) and Justin Chambers (Alex Karev).

Wetpaint gave a favorable review, stating, "Fingers crossed we're done crying at Grey's Anatomy, right? Fortunately, tonight's episode was a little more lighthearted than what Shonda Rhimes & Co. have been giving us lately, although the dark stuff will definitely be there." TV Fanatic also praised the episode, remarking, "As sad as I am that Derek Shepherd (Patrick Dempsey) is gone, I have to say, I like where this is heading. The idea of Meredith being back in her house, with her friends, in a community is just what she needs, and it also seems to be the way she thrives." The transformation of April was lauded, with the site calling her a "rockstar" and highlighting a particular scene, "April is a rock star. I hate to see her having problems with Jackson, but I love the change she's going through. She looked like a freakin' superhero bringing in the car with that trapped patient the other doctors left behind."

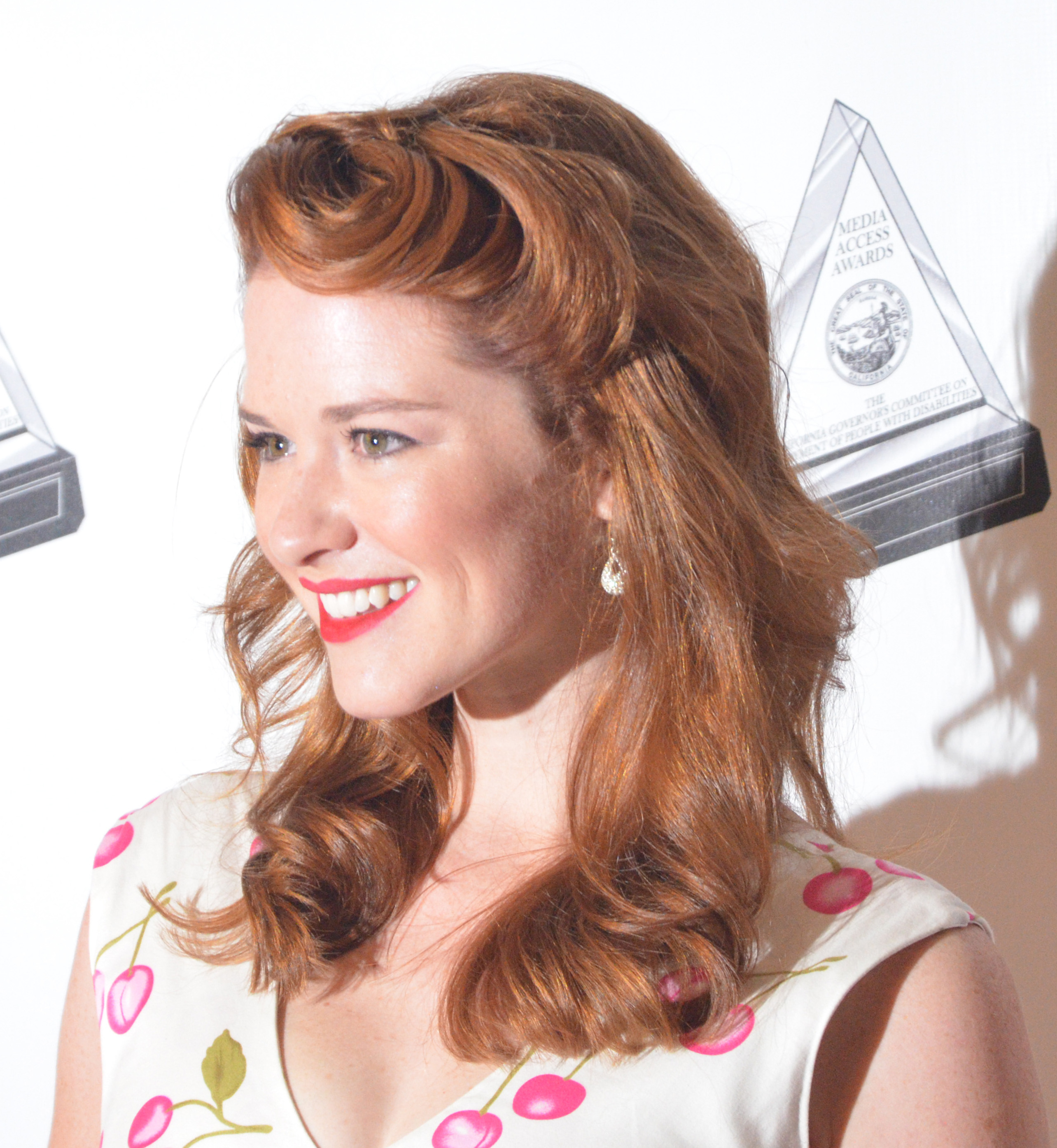
The critics highly praised the development of April Kepner's character played by Sarah Drew.

TV Equals also praised April's development, writing, "After spending the whole episode being a total downer about pretty much every patient, April took a page out of Owen Hunt's (Kevin McKidd) book and was spectacularly innovative. The team had decided that Keith wouldn't survive being extracted from the car because he was too far from the hospital. So April had the entire car towed to the hospital. You GO, Kepner!" They added, "I'm kind of digging this darker, grittier April." Regarding the tension between Amelia Shepherd (Caterina Scorsone) and Meredith, the site commented, "Amelia lost her brother, but Meredith lost her husband and the father of her children. I found the total disregard for that to be completely off-putting. I know I'm supposed to feel badly for Amelia, yet she is so self-absorbed about it all that I'm on Team Meredith for this one."

Entertainment Weekly offered a mixed review, stating, "[This] episode was a return to Grey's of episodes past—and while the normalcy was welcome, the hour was mostly disappointing." The publication did, however, praise the growing friendship between Alex and Meredith, noting, "Although I'm all-around down on the show at this point, I am intrigued by Alex and Meredith's growing friendship. It's sweet to see him attached to something, and especially sweet knowing that Meredith is part of that attachment. Hooray for loyalty!"

Guardianlv gave a positive review, stating, "Overall, the Grey's Anatomy episode was quite light. It was back to what it always did best; telling the medical story." TV Overmind praised Chambers' portrayal of Alex, highlighting his growth since the first season: "As a first-year intern, Alex was a cocky, rude man-whore. He had nothing but ambition and no time for emotional attachments, other than the dysfunctional ones he had with his family. Since then, he has put down solid roots with an esteemed career, a healthy relationship, and good friends." They also commented on the wedding of Richard Webber (James Pickens Jr.) and Catherine Avery (Debbie Allen), writing, "Catherine proves she really is made for Richard because she just happily switches gears and comes to the hospital to help with the onslaught of patients. However, Catherine teeters on the edge of self-sabotage, bossing Richard around by the end of the day."
