= You're My Home =

You're My Home may refer to:

- "You're My Home" (song), a 1973 song by Billy Joel
- You're My Home (TV series), a 2015 Philippine TV series
- "You're My Home" (Grey's Anatomy), an episode of the American TV series Grey's Anatomy
