= Grey's Anatomy season 12 =

Season of television series

Grey's Anatomy
- Season 12
- DVD cover art for the twelfth season of Grey's Anatomy
- Showrunners: William Harper; Stacy McKee; Shonda Rhimes
- Starring: Ellen Pompeo; Justin Chambers; Chandra Wilson; James Pickens Jr.; Sara Ramirez; Kevin McKidd; Jessica Capshaw; Sarah Drew; Jesse Williams; Caterina Scorsone; Camilla Luddington; Jerrika Hinton; Kelly McCreary; Jason George; Martin Henderson; Giacomo Gianniotti
- No. of episodes: 24

Release
- Original network: ABC
- Original release: September 24, 2015 – May 19, 2016

Season chronology
- ← Previous; Season 11 Next → Season 13

The twelfth season of the American television medical drama Grey's Anatomy was ordered on May 7, 2015, by ABC. It premiered on September 24, 2015, in the United States on ABC. The twelfth season includes the show's 250th episode, "Guess Who's Coming to Dinner", which is the fifth episode of the season. The season is produced by ABC Studios, in association with Shondaland Production Company and The Mark Gordon Company; the showrunners being Stacy McKee and William Harper. The season commenced airing with the premiere episode "Sledgehammer" and concluded with the finale episode "Family Affair".

This season was the first not to feature Patrick Dempsey as Dr. Derek Shepherd following the death of the character at the end of the eleventh season. On June 5, 2015 ABC announced that Jason George has been promoted to series-regular status after having performed a recurring role as Dr. Ben Warren since the sixth season of the medical drama. Part way into the season, Martin Henderson was introduced as new regular character, Dr. Nathan Riggs. In the tenth episode of the season, Giacomo Gianniotti was also promoted to series-regular status as intern Andrew DeLuca.

The season garnered 11.21 million average viewers and was ranked #21 overall in total viewers which is 15 spots higher than the previous season. TV critics and analysts noted the renewed interest in viewership with Rich Kissell of Variety calling it a 'renaissance.' Grey's Anatomy finished the 2015–16 television season as ABC's highest-rated drama in the 18-49 demographics and also ranked among the top 5 dramas on all of broadcast, averaging a 3.9 rating in the demo, an unprecedented accomplishment for a show in its 12th season. On March 3, 2016, the network renewed Grey's Anatomy for a thirteenth season.

The website Screen Rant ranked the season #9 on their 2023 ranking of the 19 Grey's Anatomy seasons.

== Episodes ==
The number in the "No. overall" column refers to the episode's number within the overall series, whereas the number in the "No. in season" column refers to the episode's number within this particular season. "U.S. viewers in millions" refers to the number of Americans in millions who watched the episodes live. Each episode of this season is named after a song.

No. overall	No. in season	Title	Directed by	Written by	Original release date	Prod. code	U.S. viewers (millions)
246	1	"Sledgehammer"	Kevin McKidd	Stacy McKee	September 24, 2015	1201	9.55
Three months after hosting Richard and Catherine’s wedding, Meredith has moved back into her old house and is adjusting to life with Amelia and Maggie, in which a fight over a wall begins. At the hospital, after being run over by a train, two fifteen-year old girls admit their love for each other, much to their parents' dismay. Callie steps in to advocate for one of the girls, which outrages the girl's mother. The fathers bond and learn to accept their daughters for who they are. Meanwhile, Arizona looks for a new roommate, but after discovering from Stephanie why no one will live with her, Arizona agrees to have an intern, Andrew, as her roommate. Bailey is introduced to Dr. Tracy McConnell, Catherine’s candidate for Chief of Surgery. Discouraged by how great Tracy is, Bailey withdraws from the race, but Ben manages to convince her to fight for the position. After giving her speech mid-surgery, Bailey is elected Chief of Surgery. April returns to Seattle after three months in Jordan only to find Jackson less than warm and welcoming. Meredith makes up with Amelia and tears down the wall in her house.
247	2	"Walking Tall"	Debbie Allen	Meg Marinis	October 1, 2015	1202	8.58
The pressure is on for Bailey as it's her first day as Chief of Surgery, and she wants it to be perfect. However, her behavior comes off too strong when she makes a very tall woman the priority patient for all the attendings, giving them only four hours to prep for her surgery. Meanwhile, April is sealed in a bubble for the day after discovering that she has an unidentifiable rash, leading her to deal with everyone's problems as they visit her, without managing to fix her own with Jackson since he's avoiding her. In surgery, the doctors are able to operate on the tall woman's pituitary gland tumor and her fractured vertebrae. Richard gives Bailey words of advice about being Chief, which leads Bailey to congratulating the doctors on saving the woman’s life and promising to be a better Chief. Bailey appoints Meredith Chief of General Surgery after telling her she needs her to be her Bailey.
248	3	"I Choose You"	Rob Corn	William Harper	October 8, 2015	1203	8.12
Jo finds evidence of Alex and his ex-wife, Dr. Izzie Stevens (Katherine Heigl)’s frozen embryos, which raises questions about what Alex thinks of his future with her. Meanwhile at the hospital, Alex is faced with a terribly difficult decision after newborn twins, Emma and Daniel, need liver transplants; however, only one of the parents is a match, and no other donors can be found. Alex must decide which baby receives the transplant. He saves Emma’s life, but despite his best efforts, Daniel does not make it through surgery. Meredith gets her new contract in the mail, but her fellow colleagues are thrown off by how little she’ll be making. She finally works up the nerve to stand up for herself, which is the lesson Bailey wanted to teach Meredith. Maggie gets an invitation to her ex-boyfriend's wedding, which drives her crazy and leads to kissing Andrew at Joe's. April and Jackson’s relationship continues to deteriorate to the point of Jackson moving out of their home and into Bailey and Ben’s. Absent: Kevin McKidd as Owen Hunt.
249	4	"Old Time Rock and Roll"	Nicole Rubio	Austin Guzman	October 15, 2015	1204	8.25
A "silver-flood" of elderly patients is brought to the ER, and with everything going on, Meredith, Maggie and Amelia forget about the dinner they are hosting. Arizona connects with one of the elderly patients, who inspires her to find love again. Maggie admits to Meredith that she regrets having sex with Andrew. Owen decides to give a crash course to the interns on how to deliver bad news to families of a deceased patient, leading Meredith to share her experience of hearing about Derek's death. Stephanie must help a patient recover from brain surgery, which brings back bad memories from her childhood of when she was a sickle-cell experiment participant. Jo accuses Stephanie of lying about her disease, and tries to get Stephanie in trouble with Amelia. After avoiding each other all day, Maggie and Andrew talk about the previous night, leading them to have sex again. At the dinner party, Callie arrives with her new girlfriend, Penny, who turns out to be the physician whose mistake caused Derek's death.
250	5	"Guess Who's Coming to Dinner"	Debbie Allen	Mark Driscoll	October 22, 2015	1205	8.96
Meredith tries to cope with Penny’s presence at the dinner party by avoiding her. Maggie fears that a possible UTI could actually be an STD contracted from having sex with Andrew, so she gets tested at the hospital. Arizona struggles with accepting Callie's new relationship, and April avoids Jackson. While gathered around the dinner table, Bailey states that Penny is going to be a new transfer resident at the hospital, which pushes Meredith to tell everyone the truth about Penny. Tension quickly arises as Amelia demands to hear how Penny killed Derek, leading her to kick Penny out of the house. Owen and Amelia later bond over their imperfect lives, Alex continues to be Meredith's person, and Jo and Stephanie fail to mend their friendship. When everyone has left, Penny apologizes to Meredith one more time, and Meredith says she'll see her on Monday. Absent: James Pickens Jr. as Dr. Richard Webber and Jason George as Dr. Benjamin Warren
251	6	"The Me Nobody Knows"	Jeannot Szwarc	Karin Gist	November 5, 2015	1206	8.50
On her first day at the hospital, Penny finds herself on Meredith’s service. Against Amelia’s wishes, Meredith tries to rise above and teach Penny; however, Callie calls Meredith out for bullying Penny instead of teaching her. April tricks Jackson into working on a young patient she met in Jordan by omitting the most recent scans of the patient’s hands, but he eventually agrees to perform reconstructive surgery. Maggie learns more about Richard when an old college friend of Richard’s and his daughter make their way into the emergency room. After talking to Richard, Meredith decides to put aside her personal problems, just as Richard did with Meredith, and continue to work with Penny.
252	7	"Something Against You"	Geary McLeod	Andy Reaser	November 12, 2015	1207	8.02
Meredith takes Richard’s advice about working with Penny, but she starts taking it too easy on Penny when a longtime elderly patient comes in for a kidney transplant. A large osteosarcoma is found on his skull, which halts the transplant until Jo realizes that the kidney donor can essentially remove the cancerous tumor by also donating a skull. Bailey and Ben begin to squabble about Jackson still living with them, so Bailey withholds sex until Ben kicks him out. Maggie learns that Bailey hired Dr. Nathan Riggs, a new cardio attending, without consulting her first, which angers her and also Owen, who seems to have a past with him. Callie keeps trying to talk to Meredith about neglecting her responsibility to teach Penny; however, Penny stands up for herself to both Callie and Meredith. Alex teaches the interns about “doc knockers”, and Arizona winds up with Richard as her wingman in the dating bar.
253	8	"Things We Lost in the Fire"	Rob Corn	Tia Napolitano	November 19, 2015	1208	8.50
Rumors begins to spread around the hospital about Owen’s connection to Nathan. Meanwhile, wildfires send a multitude of patients to the hospital, including Owen’s mother’s boyfriend. Meredith and Amelia continue to fight when Amelia finds out that Owen has been talking to Meredith and not her; the fight escalates until Meredith says she wants Amelia out of the house. Alex and Jo fall on hard times when she feels like Alex is choosing Meredith over her, but it turns out that Alex was planning a marriage proposal with Meredith’s help. In the meantime, Jo patches things up with Stephanie, and they become friends again. After having sex, Jackson and April drift further apart and eventually face the inevitable; Arizona continues to struggle with finding a date, and Meredith talks to Owen’s mother about Nathan and learns that Owen once had a sister.
254	9	"The Sound of Silence"	Denzel Washington	Stacy McKee	February 11, 2016	1209	8.28
All the doctors rally around Meredith after she is violently attacked by her seizure patient, except Amelia who blames herself for not answering Meredith's page. Jackson must break her jaw in order to fix her injuries after everyone notices that Meredith can't hear. While recovering from her injuries with her jaw wired shut, Meredith begins to become more isolated and angry. She has a panic-attack when her kids won't see her, leading Penny to cut her jaw wire allowing her to breathe. Meredith struggles with moving on until Richard talks to her about the power of forgiveness, leading her to meet and forgive the patient that attacked her. Amelia tries to make amends with Meredith; however, she isn’t ready to forgive her. Once she’s home, Meredith tells Alex to go declare his love for Jo, which he does.
255	10	"All I Want Is You"	Kevin Sullivan	Elisabeth R. Finch	February 18, 2016	1210	7.82
As part of her recovery, Meredith attends counseling where she comes to the realization that she’s at a point in her life where she can do anything she wants. Owen confesses to Amelia that Nathan was with his sister when she died, which he can’t forgive. Even though the two come together to work on a patient injured by an ambulance explosion, they quickly return to yelling at each other. A fifteen-year-old patient with cancer seeks out Alex to be her doctor, but when his treatment plan disappoints her, she fires him and pages Maggie and Callie. Callie and Penny finally make-up, as do Jo and Alex. After talking to Andrew about his secret romance, Richard finds out that it's Maggie who Andrew's dating.
256	11	"Unbreak My Heart"	Rob Corn	Elizabeth J.B. Klaviter	February 25, 2016	1211	7.23
When Jackson presents April with divorce papers, April remembers her past with Jackson - from returning from Jordan to their very first day at Mercy West Hospital. Despite all the fights and makeup sex, April and Jackson can’t work out their differences. After the signing of the divorce papers, Arizona brings the booze to April, but April reveals that she’s pregnant again. Absent: Jerrika Hinton as Dr. Stephanie Edwards, Giacomo Gianniotti as Andrew DeLuca.
257	12	"My Next Life"	Chandra Wilson	William Harper	March 3, 2016	1212	7.67
Meredith is taken back to her first day as an intern when her very first patient, Katie Bryce, finds herself back at the hospital with another brain aneurysm. Despite her requests to stay on Katie’s case, Amelia won’t have her. Richard makes Andrew his scut monkey, piling on menial tasks to punish him for being with Maggie. Meredith, who gets stuck working on a cancer patient, isn’t able to be there for Katie’s surgery, but she meets up with her afterwards to make sure she’s fine. Jo tells Alex to keep the engagement ring in the drawer, and Alex realizes April is pregnant.
258	13	"All Eyez on Me"	Charlotte Brandström	Austin Guzman	March 10, 2016	1213	7.53
The “dream team” of doctors, Bailey, Callie, Meredith, and Jackson, with resident Jo are sent to a military hospital to perform surgery on a cancer patient. However, a hesitant and stubborn doctor causes problems when he doesn’t show confidence in the plan. The doctors back at Grey Sloan Memorial Hospital must work with a group of high school cheerleaders when a stunt goes horribly wrong. Richard must teach Ben a lesson, when he goes rogue and opens up a patient in the psych ward using the clip from a clipboard and his bare hands. Meredith is flirted with by the doctor at the military hospital, and she returns the favor.
259	14	"Odd Man Out"	Kevin McKidd	Meg Marinis	March 17, 2016	1214	7.83
Richard shakes up the teams of attendings and residents, thus taking everyone out of their comfort zone. Amelia has to work together with Penny, whom she still resents for Derek's death, but Nathan helps her realize Penny is an excellent resident with a talent for neurosurgery. Amelia contemplates teaching her. Meredith works with Jo, and Jo uses the opportunity to confront Meredith about the horrible way she feels Meredith treats her. Meredith admits she's just looking out for Alex and can treat Jo personally a little bit better. Will visits Meredith to ask her out on a date because she never returned his calls. Much to her dismay, Stephanie ends up on peds, where it's puppy day. Arizona and Alex try to convince a hesitant April to tell Jackson about the pregnancy. Ben is faced with the difference in income between him and Bailey.
260	15	"I Am Not Waiting Anymore"	Nicole Rubio	Mark Driscoll	March 24, 2016	1215	7.91
Meredith tries getting back into the dating game, but despite receiving support from her colleagues, she tries cancelling her plans. While performing a triple organ transplant on a young girl, Alex and Maggie try to talk her out of it. However, Will shows up at the hospital, offers to take Meredith home, and they end up getting dinner. Once Arizona breaks April’s news to Jackson, the couple argue over raising the baby together versus separately. Arizona deals with the consequences of betraying April’s trust. Richard talks to Jackson after he tells April to do what she wants and raise the baby by herself. This leads to Jackson trying to reconcile their differences, but he fails. Owen, April, and Nathan operate on a woman whose parents and boyfriend are at odds about what’s best for her, which leads to Owen and Nathan revisiting their disdain for each other. Absent: Jason George as Dr. Benjamin Warren
261	16	"When It Hurts So Bad"	Eric Laneuville	Andy Reaser	March 31, 2016	1216	7.77
Will spends the night at Meredith’s, but when she wakes up, she has a nervous breakdown and kicks him out. To get over her guilt, she starts to clean the house from top to bottom recruiting Amelia and Maggie’s help. Sofia ends up in the ER with a head laceration and Penny is assigned to her case. Callie panics about Sofia meeting Penny so quickly, and she displaces her discomfort onto Arizona. Bailey reassures Callie about the appropriate time to introduce children to a new relationship, and Callie invites Penny to get ice cream with her and Sofia. After Andrew starts to ignore Maggie, Maggie confronts him and breaks it off. Amelia ditches Owen after she found him drinking in his trailer, knowing that she would need his support to stay sober. Catherine talks to April about her pregnancy, and finds enough evidence of fraud to go after custody rights of the baby. Will shows up on Meredith’s doorstep, and she lets him know that he’s the first guy since Derek, and that’s why she freaked out. He agrees to back off for a while, because he thinks she’s worth waiting for.
262	17	"I Wear the Face"	Chandra Wilson	Karin Gist	April 7, 2016	1217	7.35
The residents find themselves pitted against each other in a competition for the Preminger Grant. Unbeknownst to Stephanie and Jo, Penny has also applied despite the cards being stacked against her. Stuck in a traffic jam, Meredith finds herself in the middle of Owen and Nathan’s argument when Owen finds out that Nathan bought Amelia drinks. Arizona and April try to help a 14-year-old girl hide her pregnancy from her mother, until she needs surgery to save her life. Richard and Catherine face off in the wake of the news that Catherine wants Jackson to sue for custody of his baby. April accidentally hears them so, believing that Jackson knows and agrees with this, files a restraining order against him; but just as he receives the order, she comes home and finds a crib with a note saying that he is willing to let her decide how to raise the baby because he doesn't want to fight. Penny is named the winner of the grant, which shocks Callie and upsets Stephanie, who thought Amelia was in her corner. Absent: Giacomo Gianniotti as Andrew DeLuca.
263	18	"There's a Fine, Fine Line"	Jeannot Szwarc	Jen Klein	April 14, 2016	1218	7.97
Ben finds himself in trouble once again, when a Code Pink sends the hospital into lockdown mode. With all the entrances secured and the elevators shut down, Ben and Andrew must do an emergency C-section, while trapped in the hallway, on a mother who was involved in a five-car pileup. Bailey goes on a scavenger hunt to put together all the pieces of the puzzle to dole out due punishment. When the baby and the mother die, Bailey is conflicted, due to her roles as Ben’s wife and boss, as to what his punishment should be. She seeks assistance from Richard, who tells her that as Chief of Surgery, it’s her job to make the right decision. Claiming he didn’t have a choice but to go through with the C-section, Bailey resorts to security cameras to show that the elevator doors opened before he even made the first cut.
264	19	"It's Alright, Ma (I'm Only Bleeding)"	Chris Hayden	Austin Guzman	April 14, 2016	1219	7.97
After Ben blows up at Bailey for not taking his side, Bailey assembles an advisory panel to sort out the facts of Ben’s case. A post-surgical tumor case pairs Jackson and April together, who are still at odds over the custody of their baby. April starts panicking when she has a certain feeling, but Arizona assures her that the feeling is just the baby moving, something Samuel never did. Callie and Penny begin to discuss how they can make their relationship work long distance, now that Penny will be heading to New York for a year. The circumstances of Ben’s situation becomes graver when the husband crashes and Bailey shocks him back to life—after his mother signed DNR papers. The beef between Nathan and Owen, who serves on the advisory panel, prevents them from making a quick decision; however, they ultimately decide that Ben is innocent of any wrongdoing. Bailey, who isn’t satisfied with their decision, dishes out a 6 month banishment from the surgical resident program. Arizona seeks legal counsel about filing for custody when she realizes the potential threat of Callie taking Sofia with her and Penny to New York.
265	20	"Trigger Happy"	Zetna Fuentes	Zoanne Clack	April 21, 2016	1220	7.65
The doctors find themselves going through a rollercoaster of emotions after two 8-year-old boys end up in the ER due to a gunshot wound caused by playing with a gun. Alex gets upset when Jo reveals that she keeps a gun underneath their bed, and Maggie gets scared thinking about being responsible for watching Meredith’s kids. Meredith teases Stephanie about her new love interest, Kyle, after Stephanie accidentally sends Meredith an explicit text meant for him. Callie tries talking to Arizona about Sofia and the new living arrangement, but Arizona won’t have it. Despite Bailey’s ultimatum, Ben finds his way back into the OR by returning to his old job as an anesthesiologist. Owen finally opens up to Amelia about why he's still upset about the disappearance of his sister. Absent: Giacomo Gianniotti as Andrew DeLuca.
266	21	"You're Gonna Need Someone on Your Side"	Debbie Allen	Lauren Barnett	April 28, 2016	1221	7.91
Callie and Arizona must prepare for court by trying to get their friends to side with them, which proves to be difficult. While Alex denies both of them, Callie is able to get Owen and Meredith to side with her. Arizona attempts to reach out to April and Jackson, but a false positive (via ultrasound) for a birth defect sends April into a panic attack. She blames Arizona for not catching it earlier, but Arizona decides to hand the case over to another OB, so they can remain friends. Stephanie is kicked off Kyle’s case when Amelia finds out that they’re a couple. Not being able to operate leads to Stephanie breaking up with Kyle. Meredith is caught in the middle of a love triangle of two older men, one of whom has been married to his wife for 51 years. Amelia and Owen confess to each other their fears of moving forward with their relationship.
267	22	"Mama Tried"	Kevin McKidd	Tia Napolitano	May 5, 2016	1222	7.66
With Callie and Arizona unable to agree on shared custody of Sofia, their case finally goes to court to decide who gets sole custody. With their friends and co-workers testifying on their behalf several issues are raised, such as Arizona's irregular work schedule and sex life and Callie's desire to move Sofia away from her established home life to live in New York with Penny. April and Jackson tentatively begin negotiating shared custody of their unborn child. Stephanie thinks breaking up with Kyle was a mistake and almost calls him while drunk. Arizona ends up having to leave court in the middle of her testimony to save an unborn baby from an unnecessary caesarean section. Stephanie learns Kyle is back in the hospital with suspected Meningitis, chose not to tell her and angrily refuses to let her be involved. Callie assures Arizona she will always be Sofia's mom no matter what the judge decides. With the court case over, sole custody of Sofia is given to Arizona leaving Callie heartbroken and devastated.
268	23	"At Last"	Rob Corn	Stacy McKee	May 12, 2016	1223	7.77
Meredith gets upset when she finds out that Amelia and Owen are talking about marriage, moving in together and having babies. She eventually confronts Amelia about it and tells her to get her own life. Dealing with the fallout of the custody battle, Callie and Penny break it off since Callie is no longer moving to New York; Arizona calls out Callie when she tries to arrange too many nights of visitation. Stephanie is able to work her way back into Kyle’s good graces, but it’s all for naught when Amelia isn’t able to save his life during a risky surgery. Alex tells Jo that he needs an answer to his proposal because he’s ready to get married, but she doesn’t give him the answer he’s looking for. Amelia proposes to Owen and he accepts. Nathan confronts Meredith about her issues with Amelia, and the intensity of their argument leads to them making out in the hospital parking lot.
269	24	"Family Affair"	Debbie Allen	William Harper	May 19, 2016	1224	8.19
On Owen and Amelia’s wedding day, Amelia has doubts about the marriage after Meredith talks to Owen about Cristina. Meredith confides with Amelia, leading them to run away with Maggie. April is serving as Owen’s best man, but when she forgets the ring, she and Ben run back to Meredith’s house to get it. As her contractions get closer together, Ben must step up and deliver the baby with an emergency C-section. Alex and Jo fight over Jo not wanting to marry him, leading him to storm out, and her getting drunk at Joe's bar. Andrew takes her home where she reveals to already being married, but is afraid of the guy. Alex walks in on Andrew helping Jo (who is drunk and causes him to fall on her by mistake), in which he misunderstands and punches Andrew. Amelia makes it back to the wedding and marries Owen. Ben is able to save both April and her daughter's lives, while Arizona makes amends with Callie and allows her to move with Penny and share custody of Sofia. As Nathan is looking at Meredith, Maggie confides with her that she really likes Nathan, which shocks Meredith.

== Cast and characters ==
=== Main ===
- Ellen Pompeo as Dr. Meredith Grey
- Justin Chambers as Dr. Alex Karev
- Chandra Wilson as Dr. Miranda Bailey
- James Pickens Jr. as Dr. Richard Webber
- Sara Ramirez as Dr. Callie Torres
- Kevin McKidd as Dr. Owen Hunt
- Jessica Capshaw as Dr. Arizona Robbins
- Sarah Drew as Dr. April Kepner
- Jesse Williams as Dr. Jackson Avery
- Caterina Scorsone as Dr. Amelia Shepherd
- Camilla Luddington as Dr. Jo Wilson
- Jerrika Hinton as Dr. Stephanie Edwards
- Kelly McCreary as Dr. Maggie Pierce
- Jason George as Dr. Ben Warren
- Martin Henderson as Dr. Nathan Riggs
- Giacomo Gianniotti as Dr. Andrew DeLuca

=== Recurring ===
- Joe Adler as Dr. Isaac Cross
- Samantha Sloyan as Dr. Penelope Blake
- Joe Dinicol as Dr. Mitchell Spencer
- Debbie Allen as Dr. Catherine Avery
- Nicole Cummins as Paramedic Nicole
- Vivian Nixon as Dr. Hannah Brody
- Scott Elrod as Dr. Major Will Thorpe
- Wilmer Valderrama as Kyle Diaz
- Vanessa Bell Calloway as Lucinda Gamble
- Rebecca McFarland as Tara Parker
- Morgan Lily as Jennifer Parker

=== Notable guests ===
- Joey Lauren Adams as Dr. Tracy McConnell
- Mandalynn Carlson as Jessica Tanner
- Lindsay Kay Hayward as Jade Bell
- Maya Stojan as Tatiana Flauto
- Debra Mooney as Evelyn Hunt
- Drew Rausch as John Finch
- Bill Smitrovich as Therapist
- Skyler Shaye as Katie Bryce
- Casey Wilson as Courtney Hall
- Rita Moreno as Gayle McColl
- Robert Baker as Dr. Charles Percy
- Gwendoline Yeo as Michelle Carpio

== Production ==
=== Development ===
On May 7, 2015, ABC renewed Grey's Anatomy for a twelfth season for the 2015-16 television season. ABC president Paul Lee confirmed that the twelfth season would not be the final season, as he said "I would like to see it run for many, many years to come. It is powerful, vibrant brand with incredibly passionate audiences" Debbie Allen was promoted to executive producer for the twelfth season, and directed multiple episodes for the season while still recurring on camera as Dr. Catherine Avery. Production began on May 21, 2015, when Rhimes announced on Twitter that the writers were in full swing mapping the twelfth season. A promotional poster was released on September 16, 2015.

The season included the 250th episode named "Guess Who's Coming to Dinner", being the fifth episode. The cast of Grey's Anatomy had a special celebration for the 250th episode of the show with several actors sharing the celebration on Twitter on September 15, 2015. Jessica Capshaw revealed that the episode included her favorite scene so far in the season. Because of the annual Halloween television special It's the Great Pumpkin, Charlie Brown, the twelfth season had a hiatus on October 29, 2015 following the 250th episode.

The remaining fall schedule for ABC was announced on November 16, 2015 where it was announced that Grey's Anatomy would air 8 episodes in the fall with the fall finale to air on November 19, 2015, just like the rest of ABC's primetime lineup "TGIT" Scandal and How to Get Away with Murder, which was the same last year. The remaining 16 episodes will air after the winter break, beginning on February 11, 2016, and ending on May 19, 2016, as a result of ABC airing the television miniseries Madoff over 2 nights on February 3–4, 2016 in the same time-slot as Grey's Anatomy and Scandal. On March 3, 2016, ABC announced that Grey's Anatomy was renewed for a 13th season.

=== Writing ===
Regarding the death of Dr. Derek Shepherd, showrunner Shonda Rhimes commented on how future seasons would be affected by the death as she said: "Now, Meredith and the entire Grey’s Anatomy family are about to enter uncharted territory as we head into this new chapter of her life. The possibilities for what may come are endless. As Ellis Grey would say: the carousel never stops turning."

During an interview with TVLine, Shonda Rhimes said that the twelfth season will take "a much lighter tone" in the wake of Derek's death. She continued talking about Meredith's evolvement as she said "Meredith is single, and she is living this life that she’s never thought she’d be living again. She’s living in a house with her sisters. She’s surrounded by women who are dating and having a whole life, and she’s not interested in all that. [Meredith is] starting to wonder is there a second life here or are your best years behind you? I guess the theme [of Season 12] is rebirth. That evolution for that character is beautiful".

=== Casting ===
On January 23, 2014, it was reported that Ellen Pompeo and Patrick Dempsey had renewed their contracts for another 2 seasons, as Drs. Meredith Grey and Derek Shepherd, respectively, meaning their characters would be staying on the medical drama for seasons 11 and 12. On April 24, 2015, Patrick Dempsey revealed that he would be leaving Grey's Anatomy after the eleventh season despite having a contract through another season. Thus, this was the first season in which Dr. Derek Shepherd, portrayed by Patrick Dempsey, is not included in the main cast of characters. Dempsey's character Dr. Derek Shepherd was killed off towards the end of the eleventh season in the episode "How to Save a Life", meaning he would not return for the twelfth season as previously thought. ABC put out a statement claiming Dempsey wanted to pursue other interests.

On May 2, 2014, the rest of the 6 original cast mates, Justin Chambers, Chandra Wilson and James Pickens Jr., excluding Sandra Oh, renewed their contracts for another two seasons (11 and 12) as Drs. Alex Karev, Miranda Bailey, and Richard Webber, respectively. Sara Ramirez also renewed her contract for another 2 seasons as Dr. Callie Torres, which will run out after the twelfth season. However, it was later announced on May 20, 2016 that Sara Ramirez, who portrayed Callie Torres for 10 seasons, would leave Grey's. Chambers announced on March 11, 2016, on Twitter that he will return as Dr. Alex Karev for the 13th season.

On June 5, 2015, it was announced that after several seasons of being a recurring role, Jason George was upgraded to a series-regular. It was announced on June 15, 2015, that Martin Henderson, who played a doctor on the ShondaLand produced show Off the Map, would be added as a series-regular for the twelfth season. He will make his debut in the middle of the season, according to Rhimes. On June 28, 2015, it was announced that Jessica Capshaw, whose contract expired after Season 11, had renewed her contract for another 3 seasons as Dr. Arizona Robbins. This means that her character will be staying on the show through seasons 12 as well as possible seasons 13 and 14.

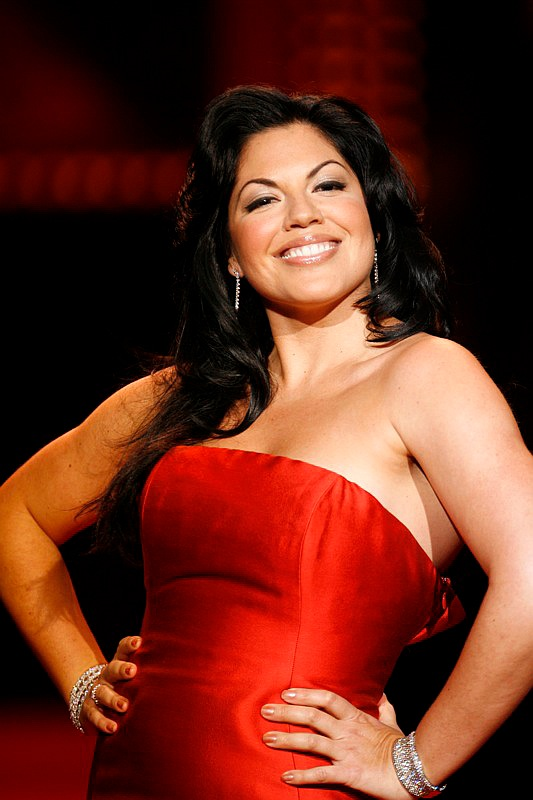
Sara Ramirez made her final appearance as Dr. Callie Torres in the season finale.

It was announced on September 11, 2015 that Chasing Amy actress Joey Lauren Adams would guest star as Dr. Tracy McConnell, Dr. Bailey's opponent for Chief of Surgery, and appeared in the season premiere. TV veteran Bill Smitrovich was announced on November 12, 2015, to guest star as a therapist in the tenth episode of the season. After appearing as Dr. Andrew DeLuca as a guest-star in the first eight episodes, Giacomo Gianniotti was upgraded to a series-regular on January 8, 2016. It was announced on January 8, 2016 that Maya Stojan will appear in 1 episode as a guest-star which later turned out to be Jackson's patient Tatiana whom he treated over several years. On February 26, 2016, it was announced that Casey Wilson and Rita Moreno would both guest star in episode 14 of the season. Variety announced on March 8, 2016, that Wilmer Valderrama was cast as Kyle Diaz, a recurring role which he will play in a multi-episode arc.

The season marked the last appearance for long-time cast member Sara Ramirez who played Dr. Callie Torres on the series since 2006. Her character was involved in a custody battle with ex-wife Dr. Arizona Robbins, played by Jessica Capshaw, which led to the former's move to New York from Seattle. On May 19, in a note posted on Twitter after the season finale, Ramirez wrote that she was “taking some welcome time off.” Rhimes replied to the tweet by saying, “I will miss Callie tremendously, but am excited for what the future holds for Sara. She will always have a home at Shondaland.” Later, speaking at the Vulture Festival in New York City on May 22, Rhimes, told that she didn't know that Ramirez was leaving until they had shot the finale. She addressed Callie's send-off and said, “This one was different because it wasn’t a big planned thing, I had a different plan going and when Sara came in and said, ‘I really need to take this break,’ I was lucky that we’d shot the end of the season with her going to New York.”

=== Filming ===
Prepping for the season began on July 13, 2015. The table read for the premiere was on July 15, 2015. Filming began on July 22, 2015. Two-time Academy Awards winner Denzel Washington was announced by TVLine to direct the ninth episode of the season, which will be Washington's first go at directing television. He previously directed the films Antwone Fisher and The Great Debaters .

== Reception ==
=== Ratings ===
==== Live + SD ratings ====
No. in series	No. in season	Episode	Air date	Time slot (EST)	Rating/Share (18–49)	Viewers (m)	18–49 Rank	Viewership rank	Drama rank
246	1	"Sledgehammer"	September 24, 2015	Thursdays; 8:00 p.m.	2.8/10	9.55	14	21	4
247	2	"Walking Tall"	October 1, 2015	Thursdays; 8:00 p.m.	2.3/8	8.58	16	25	4
248	3	"I Choose You"	October 8, 2015	Thursdays; 8:00 p.m.	2.2/8	8.12	12	23	5
249	4	"Old Time Rock and Roll"	October 15, 2015	Thursdays; 8:00 p.m.	2.3/8	8.25	12	19	4
250	5	"Guess Who's Coming to Dinner"	October 22, 2015	Thursdays; 8:00 p.m.	2.4/8	8.96	12	17	3
251	6	"The Me Nobody Knows"	November 5, 2015	Thursdays; 8:00 p.m.	2.3/8	8.50	11	19	2
252	7	"Something Against You"	November 12, 2015	Thursdays; 8:00 p.m.	2.2/7	8.02	12	24	3
253	8	"Things We Lost in the Fire"	November 19, 2015	Thursdays; 8:00 p.m.	2.5/8	8.50	10	19	2
254	9	"The Sound of Silence"	February 11, 2016	Thursdays; 8:00 p.m.	2.4/8	8.28	6	17	3
255	10	"All I Want Is You"	February 18, 2016	Thursdays; 8:00 p.m.	2.2/7	7.82	5	15	2
256	11	"Unbreak My Heart"	February 25, 2016	Thursdays; 8:00 p.m.	2.1/7	7.23	10	24	3
257	12	"My Next Life"	March 3, 2016	Thursdays; 8:00 p.m.	2.2/8	7.67	5	17	1
258	13	"All Eyez on Me"	March 10, 2016	Thursdays; 8:00 p.m.	2.1/7	7.53	7	17	1
259	14	"Odd Man Out"	March 17, 2016	Thursdays; 8:00 p.m.	2.1/7	7.83	7	18	1
260	15	"I Am Not Waiting Anymore"	March 24, 2016	Thursdays; 8:00 p.m.	2.1/7	7.91	9	15	2
261	16	"When It Hurts So Bad"	March 31, 2016	Thursdays; 8:00 p.m.	2.2/8	7.77	6	20	2
262	17	"I Wear the Face"	April 7, 2016	Thursdays; 8:00 p.m.	2.1/8	7.35	7	19	2
263	18	"There's a Fine, Fine Line"	April 14, 2016	Thursdays; 8:00 p.m.	2.2/8	7.97	4	20	2
264	19	"It's Alright, Ma (I'm Only Bleeding)"	April 14, 2016	Thursday; 9:00 p.m.	2.2/8	7.97	4	20	2
265	20	"Trigger Happy"	April 21, 2016	Thursdays; 8:00 p.m.	2.0/8	7.65	4	21	2
266	21	"You're Gonna Need Someone on Your Side"	April 28, 2016	Thursdays; 8:00 p.m.	2.0/7	7.91	4	20	2
267	22	"Mama Tried"	May 5, 2016	Thursdays; 8:00 p.m.	2.0/8	7.66	6	19	2
268	23	"At Last"	May 12, 2016	Thursdays; 8:00 p.m.	2.1/8	7.77	3	18	2
269	24	"Family Affair"	May 19, 2016	Thursdays; 8:00 p.m.	2.3/9	8.19	4	12	3

==== Live + 7 Day (DVR) ratings ====
No. in series	No. in season	Episode	Air date	Time slot (EST)	18–49 rating increase	Viewers (millions) increase	Total 18-49	Total viewers (millions)	Ref
246	1	"Sledgehammer"	September 24, 2015	Thursdays; 8:00 p.m.	1.6	3.36	4.4	12.91	
247	2	"Walking Tall"	October 1, 2015	Thursdays; 8:00 p.m.	1.8	3.66	4.1	12.24	
248	3	"I Choose You"	October 8, 2015	Thursdays; 8:00 p.m.	1.5	3.40	3.7	11.53	
249	4	"Old Time Rock and Roll"	October 15, 2015	Thursdays; 8:00 p.m.	1.5	3.38	3.8	11.62	
250	5	"Guess Who's Coming to Dinner"	October 22, 2015	Thursdays; 8:00 p.m.	1.5	3.25	3.9	12.21	
251	6	"The Me Nobody Knows"	November 5, 2015	Thursdays; 8:00 p.m.	1.6	3.57	3.9	12.08	
252	7	"Something Against You"	November 12, 2015	Thursdays; 8:00 p.m.	1.6	3.46	3.8	11.48	
253	8	"Things We Lost in the Fire"	November 19, 2015	Thursdays; 8:00 p.m.	1.4	3.27	3.9	11.77	
254	9	"The Sound of Silence"	February 11, 2016	Thursdays; 8:00 p.m.	1.3	3.44	3.7	11.73	
255	10	"All I Want Is You"	February 18, 2016	Thursdays; 8:00 p.m.	1.5	3.59	3.7	11.41	
256	11	"Unbreak My Heart"	February 25, 2016	Thursdays; 8:00 p.m.	1.5	3.40	3.6	10.60	
257	12	"My Next Life"	March 3, 2016	Thursdays; 8:00 p.m.	1.7	3.70	3.9	11.36	
258	13	"All Eyez on Me"	March 10, 2016	Thursdays; 8:00 p.m.	1.6	3.63	3.7	11.16	
259	14	"Odd Man Out"	March 17, 2016	Thursdays; 8:00 p.m.	1.6	3.52	3.7	11.35	
260	15	"I Am Not Waiting Anymore"	March 24, 2016	Thursdays; 8:00 p.m.	1.5	3.54	3.6	11.45	
261	16	"When It Hurts So Bad"	March 31, 2016	Thursdays; 8:00 p.m.	1.5	3.54	3.7	11.17	
262	17	"I Wear the Face"	April 7, 2016	Thursdays; 8:00 p.m.	1.5	3.47	3.6	10.82	
263	18	"There's a Fine, Fine Line"	April 14, 2016	Thursdays; 8:00 p.m.	1.5	3.41	3.7	11.40	
264	19	"It's Alright, Ma (I'm Only Bleeding)"	April 14, 2016	Thursday; 9:00 p.m.	1.5	3.41	3.7	11.40	
265	20	"Trigger Happy"	April 21, 2016	Thursdays; 8:00 p.m.	1.5	3.22	3.5	10.89	
266	21	"You're Gonna Need Someone on Your Side"	April 28, 2016	Thursdays; 8:00 p.m.	1.7	3.57	3.7	11.47	
267	22	"Mama Tried"	May 5, 2016	Thursdays; 8:00 p.m.	1.5	3.39	3.5	11.05	
268	23	"At Last"	May 12, 2016	Thursdays; 8:00 p.m.	1.5	3.57	3.6	11.32	
269	24	"Family Affair"	May 19, 2016	Thursdays; 8:00 p.m.	1.5	3.32	3.8	11.51	

=== Critical response ===
NPR listed Grey's Anatomy as #7 on their list of the best television of 2015. A.V. Club's Caroline Siede described the twelfth season of Grey's Anatomy as "phenomenal", stating that the series underwent a "powerful renaissance this year". A final grade of A− was given to the season.

=== Accolades ===
Award	Category	Nominee	Result
People's Choice Award	Favorite TV Show	Grey's Anatomy	Nominated
People's Choice Award	Favorite TV Drama	Grey's Anatomy	Won
People's Choice Award	Favorite Dramatic TV Actor	Justin Chambers	Nominated
People's Choice Award	Favorite Dramatic TV Actor	Jesse Williams	Nominated
People's Choice Award	Favorite Dramatic TV Actress	Ellen Pompeo	Won
People's Choice Award	Favorite Dramatic TV Actress	Sara Ramirez	Nominated
GLAAD Media Awards	Outstanding Drama Series	Grey's Anatomy	Nominated

== DVD release ==
Grey's Anatomy: The Complete Twelfth Season - Let the Sun Shine
Set Details		Special Features
24 Episodes; 6-Disc Set; English (Dolby Digital 5.1 Surround); Subtitles: English SDH, Spanish & French; Runtime: 1028 minutes		In Stitches — Check Out The Cast Cutting Up, Both In And Out Of the OR; Deleted Scenes
Release Dates
Region 1	Region 2	Region 4
August 30, 2016	October 3, 2016	August 26, 2016
