= You're My Home (Grey's Anatomy) =

- Grey's Anatomy episode
- Derek's final phone call to Meredith is shown.
- Episode no.: Season 11; Episode 25
- Directed by: Rob Corn
- Written by: William Harper
- Original air date: May 14, 2015
- Running time: 43 minutes

Episode chronology
← Previous "Time Stops"	Next → "Sledgehammer"
- Grey's Anatomy season 11

"You're My Home" is the twenty-fifth episode and the season finale of the eleventh season of the American television medical drama Grey's Anatomy, and the 245th episode overall. It aired on May 14, 2015, on ABC in the United States. The episode was written by William Harper and directed by Rob Corn. On its initial airing, the episode received positive reviews from television critics and was watched by 8.33 million viewers.

This episode marked the final regular appearance of Patrick Dempsey as Derek Shepherd.

== Plot ==
With only having five minutes to get April's patient out of the car to the operating table, Stephanie's interns have to help make a clear path. Alex asks Jo if it's okay if Meredith and the kids move in, which Jo misunderstands as Alex wanting to plant roots and have a family with Meredith. Alex clarifies his question, so Jo goes out to buy a fixer-upper for just her and Alex.

Meredith tries to repair the damage between Amelia and her by allowing Amelia to hear the last voice mail that Derek left on Meredith's phone. April tells Jackson that she wants to go back overseas, but he gives her an ultimatum: she can go, but if she does, he won't be there when she gets back.

Richard tells Bailey that she will be the next chief of surgery, but Catherine won't have it. The couple begin to argue again, so Meredith plays the “my husband is dead” card, and she tells them to work out whatever it is that's causing their separation. Richard and Catherine compromise their differences; one of which is Bailey having to run against an outside candidate of Catherine's choice. By working out their differences, Richard and Catherine get married in the hospital's chapel, and they have their reception at Meredith and Derek's house.

During the party, Maggie tells Meredith that her parents are getting divorced, and that the reason why she didn't tell her before was because her problems seemed so trivial to Meredith's. Meredith comforts Maggie by saying she can always talk to her, and she, Maggie, and Amelia "dance-it-out."

== Reception ==
=== Rating ===
"You're My Home" was originally broadcast on May 14, 2015, in the United States on the American Broadcasting Company (ABC). The episode was watched by a total of 8.83 million viewers a raise from the previous episode's 7.74. In the key 18-49 demographic, the episode scored a 2.1/8 in Nielsen ratings

=== Reviews ===
The episode received positive reviews from critics.

TVFanatic gave a positive review to the episode, "It's a satisfying ending that would actually work well for a series finale, if you don't count that last strange black-and-white shot of Meredith dancing. The point is, there aren't any cliffhangers. We didn't end with a need for extra tissues. The doctors all working together for a perfect plan, all based on perfect timing, is intense and powerful."

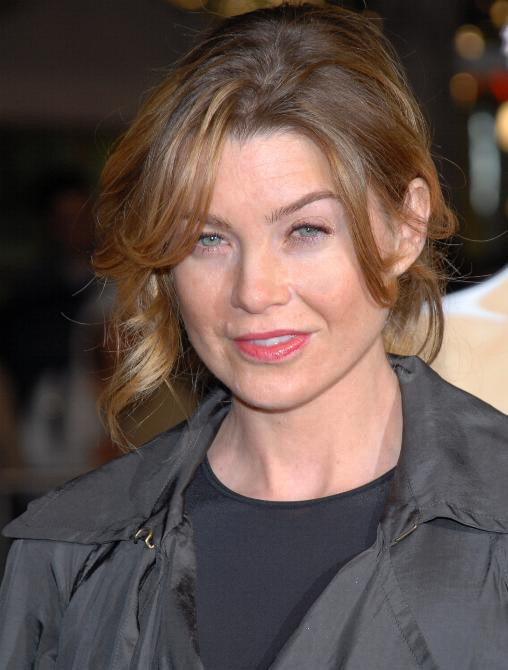
The season was praised for bringing the focus back on the central character Meredith Grey portrayed by Ellen Pompeo.

The A.V. Club wrote, "when it comes to creating disasters and accidents and catastrophes to weave her cast around, no one does it better than Shonda Rhimes. The compelling medical maladies and advancements offer a ready framework for the doctors’ soapy emotional situations to cling to." TwoCentsTV gave a dull review calling the episode "unmemorable", "Odds are you don’t think of the one where Meredith fudged the Alzheimer’s trial, took Zola home, and Derek wouldn’t return her calls. Sadly, this finale, will probably be solely remembered as “there were episodes after Derek died that year?”. BuddyTV gave the finale a positive review, "'You're My Home', proved to be so bright and shiny. This is an episode that nearly could have served as a series finale, though we know that is not the case. Indeed, a few characters notwithstanding, most of our beloved surgeons are in a shockingly good place as season 11 draws to a close." adding, "I was very impressed tonight as Meredith, who can be very selfish but - in fairness - has suffered great personal loss in the death of Derek, stepped up to the plate on behalf of others. When one considers how this character has grown over eleven seasons, it really is amazing. Kudos to Ellen Pompeo for her fine work. She's actually done the impossible, because I actually care what happens to Meredith Grey in season 12."

TV Equals wrote, "I’m not exactly a fan of doctors breaking out in tears in the operating room, but I liked how Amelia and Maggie’s respective conflicts culminated in a nice moment of sisterly bonding and dancing it off with Meredith at the end of the episode. If I continue with Grey’s Anatomy next season, it will largely be because of my interest in seeing what the writers do with Amelia and Maggie and by extension, Meredith." Entertainment Weekly gave a mixed-to-positive review to the episode stating, "This (the episode) felt like… well, a regular old episode. And that’s not what I expect out of a Grey’s season finale. This isn’t to say it was bad, because it wasn’t. The episode focused on romance more than anything, which was a nice change of pace in a way." The site praised April-Jackson arc, "I didn’t used to like April and Jackson. But over the seasons, I’ve come to appreciate their relationship and all its complications." EW also lauded the development of Meredith Grey saying, "At its core, Grey’s is about relationships—ones that persevere, ones that don’t—and it warms my heart to see Meredith finding strength in her relationships with friends and family right now. She might not be dark and twisty anymore, but she’s still Meredith. And that’s why, 10 years and plenty of frustration later, I (mostly) can’t wait for the twelfth season to roll around."

E Online also gave a positive review, "Tonight's finale felt like any other standard Grey's Anatomy mid-season episode since no doctor was in any physical danger... up until the last 5 minutes, when she managed to slip in 1 scene that totally and completely wrecked us all over again. Derek's final phone call to Meredith, those were the perfect last words, and because of that, they were the cruelest last words." adding that, "Jo finally said "I love you" to Alex! These two deserve the happiest of endings." TVOvermind also gave a mostly positive review, "It’s been an incredibly difficult and heartbreaking season of Grey’s Anatomy. After all of that loss, the show opted for a more-hopeful season finale, even if there were some low points." The Daily Fandom wrote "The finale didn’t really feel much like a season finale (more like a series finale, to be quite honest). I’m at peace with how it ended though. It showed how everyone was moving on, whether it be together or because they’re heading in new direction altogether." and deemed Caterina Scorsone "phenomenal".
