= Andrew DeLuca =

- Grey's Anatomy character
- Promotional image of Giacomo Gianniotti as Dr. Andrew DeLuca
- First appearance: Grey's Anatomy: "Time Stops" (11.24); May 7, 2015 (as recurring cast) "All I Want Is You (12.10); February 18, 2016 (as series regular); Station 19: "No Recovery" (2.01); October 4, 2018
- Last appearance: Station 19: "Train In Vain" (4.06); March 11, 2021; Grey's Anatomy: "In My Life" (17.09); March 25, 2021
- Portrayed by: Giacomo Gianniotti

In-universe information
- Full name: Andrea DeLuca
- Aliases: Andrew; Mr. Secret Lover; Deluces; Blandrew; Garfunkel; Loverboy
- Title: M.D.
- Occupation: Surgical resident; Surgical intern; EMT; Chief Resident; Attending general surgeon
- Family: Vincenzo DeLuca (father); Lucia DeLuca (mother); Carina DeLuca (sister); Liam DeLuca-Bishop (adoptive nephew); Andrea DeLuca-Bishop (adoptive niece); Gianna DeLuca-Bishop (adoptive niece); Maya Bishop (sister-in-law)
- Significant others: Sam Bello (ex-girlfriend); Maggie Pierce (ex-girlfriend); Meredith Grey (ex-girlfriend)
- Nationality: Italian-American
- Born: 1987
- Died: 2020
- Status: Deceased

Andrew DeLuca, M.D., is a fictional character from the medical drama television series Grey's Anatomy, which airs on ABC in the United States, and is portrayed by Giacomo Gianniotti. Gianniotti was cast in April 2015, and his character was promoted to series regular status in January 2016. In 2018, Gianniotti also appeared as a guest in the Grey's Anatomy spin-off series Station 19.

Andrew was introduced at the end of Season 11 as a new surgical intern at Grey Sloan Memorial Hospital and eventually advanced to the position of resident in Season 13. Throughout his time on the show, Andrew formed personal connections with many of the attending surgeons, a rare development among interns and residents. His storyline often focused on his struggles with the pressures of a competitive profession, fitting in with his peers, and navigating personal relationships with his colleagues.

Gianniotti exited the series in season 17. For his performance, Gianniotti received nominations for two Golden Maple Awards in 2016.

== Development ==
On April 15, 2015, it was announced that Giacomo Gianniotti had been cast in an undisclosed role for the final two episodes of Grey's Anatomy's eleventh season, with the possibility of recurring in Season 12. He was promoted to the main cast on January 8, 2016, midway through the twelfth season.

The announcement of Gianniotti's casting and the introduction of his character, Andrew DeLuca, initially received backlash from some fans who felt that DeLuca was intended to replace Derek Shepherd (Patrick Dempsey), a beloved character recently written off the show following Dempsey's departure. However, Gianniotti clarified that this was not the case, stating, "I'm just a new character on the show. I'm not filling any void." He reassured fans that "Andrew won't have any [romantic] intentions with Meredith [Grey] so fans don't have to worry about any threat."

In the early days of portraying DeLuca, Gianniotti struggled with the technical aspects of performing surgeries on screen. He recalled, "My first surgery went terribly because I didn't know the protocol for so many things, and the other actors were laughing at me. I was just getting everything wrong. Like, once you're in the OR, your hands have to be by your chest, otherwise you're no longer sterile — I just didn't know that, or how to hold my instruments." Despite the initial challenges, the lack of strict direction gave Gianniotti the freedom to "fill in the blanks" and develop the character on his own. He described Andrew as "a very honest, genuine, passionate guy" who is "very driven." Gianniotti also noted that Andrew was more of an introvert who, as an adult, was "rediscovering who he is as a man [and] how to date women."

== Background ==
When Andrew DeLuca was young, he and his mother moved to Wisconsin from Italy while his sister, Carina (Stefania Spampinato), stayed behind with their father, Vincenzo DeLuca (Lorenzo Caccialanza). Vincenzo was a renowned but corrupt and mentally unstable surgeon in Italy. After operating in a manic state and causing the deaths of four patients, Vincenzo used his connections and wealth to avoid prosecution, prompting Andrew's mother to leave with him. At some point, Andrew's mother returned to Italy to visit Carina, where she suffered a stroke and died.

There is an inconsistency in the storyline regarding Andrew's family. When Andrew is assaulted by Alex Karev, Maggie Pierce mentions that she will call his parents because they know her. However, later seasons reveal that Andrew's mother had already died and he hadn't seen his father, who was still in Italy, for years.

Both DeLuca siblings are fluent in Italian and English. Due to their different upbringing environments, Carina speaks English with an Italian accent, while Andrew speaks Italian with an American accent. Before pursuing a medical career, Andrew worked as an EMT straight out of high school. At some point in his past, he was in a chaotic relationship with future colleague Sam Bello (Jeanine Mason), but their relationship was left unresolved when Sam moved away.

== Storylines ==
In the penultimate episode of Grey's Anatomy's eleventh season, titled "Time Stops", Dr. Andrew DeLuca makes his first appearance. Emerging from a rescue vehicle carrying victims from a tunnel collapse, Andrew identifies himself as a surgeon who had been on his way to work at Grey Sloan Memorial Hospital when he saw the accident and assisted in the rescue. Because he is wearing a suit and appears confident, the other doctors assume he is an attending. However, it is soon revealed that Andrew is actually a new intern, which leads to him being ostracized by his fellow interns, who believe he was posing as an attending.

Alienated from the other interns, Andrew ends up moving in with Arizona Robbins (Jessica Capshaw). He also briefly dates Maggie Pierce (Kelly McCreary), the Chief of Cardiothoracic Surgery, but ends the relationship due to feeling professionally intimidated by her. Later, Andrew develops feelings for Jo Wilson (Camilla Luddington) and takes her home from a bar when she is too drunk to drive. When Jo begins to undress, Andrew falls on top of her just as Jo's boyfriend, Alex Karev (Justin Chambers) walks in. Misunderstanding the situation, Alex assaults Andrew, beating him nearly to death. Andrew files felony charges against Alex, causing tension with his colleagues, many of whom have long-standing friendships with Alex. Just as Alex is about to go to jail, Andrew retracts the charges for Jo's sake.

Andrew later becomes a surgical resident, and his ex-girlfriend, Sam Bello (Jeanine Mason), joins Grey Sloan Memorial as an intern. His sister, Carina DeLuca (Stefania Spampinato), also joins the hospital staff and begins dating Arizona, much to Andrew's discomfort. Carina disapproves of Sam, believing she is a stalker. Andrew and Sam rekindle their relationship, but it ends when Sam leaves to avoid deportation. Afterward, a heartbroken Andrew drunkenly kisses Meredith Grey (Ellen Pompeo) at Jo and Alex's wedding, eventually realizing his feelings for her are real. After months of pursuing her, Andrew begins a relationship with Meredith.

Andrew's relationship with his father, Vincenzo (Lorenzo Caccialanza), becomes a central storyline when Vincenzo arrives at Grey Sloan Memorial to research an external womb. Andrew joins the project to advance his career but soon realizes that his father's mental illness is getting in the way. After the project fails, Andrew has an emotional confrontation with Vincenzo, who leaves Seattle. As his relationship with Meredith deepens, Andrew takes the fall for her insurance fraud to protect her, landing him in prison. Meredith visits him in jail, professes her love for him, and vows to get him released.

After Meredith turns herself in, Andrew is released and rehired at Grey Sloan. However, their relationship becomes strained when Andrew notices Meredith still compares him to her late husband, Derek Shepherd (Patrick Dempsey). Though they briefly reconcile, Andrew breaks up with Meredith for good when she expresses concern that he might be showing signs of mania, possibly due to bipolar disorder. Carina, recognizing similarities between Andrew's behavior and their father's, becomes increasingly worried about his mental health. Despite his worsening condition, Andrew makes a significant medical diagnosis, identifying Richard Webber’s (James Pickens Jr.) cobalt poisoning, which alters his career trajectory.

In Season 17, Andrew becomes an attending and appears to have recovered from his mental health struggles. However, in the episode "Helplessly Hoping", Andrew dies after being stabbed by an accomplice of Opal, a human trafficker whom Andrew had recognized earlier. After following Opal and calling the police, Andrew's efforts lead to her arrest, but he is gravely injured in the process. Although Andrew undergoes surgery at Grey Sloan and initially recovers, he codes during a second surgery, and his time of death is called at 22:50. In Meredith's COVID-19-induced "afterlife" dream sequence, Andrew appears on a beach where he says his goodbyes to Meredith and is reunited with his deceased mother.

== Reception ==
Despite initial skepticism, DeLuca was received positively by fans and critics. Rebecca Farley of Refinery29 described DeLuca as "passionate, handsome, and a bit of an idiot," acknowledging the character's flaws while also affirming his appeal. Farley cited the fact that DeLuca remained on Grey's Anatomy after multiple seasons as evidence that the "Rhimesian jury" had ruled in his favor, confirming his likability. Rachel Chapman of Elite Daily called DeLuca "charming" and praised him for how he "truly handles stuff like a pro."

In 2016, Gianniotti was nominated for two Golden Maple Awards: Best Actor in a TV Series Broadcast in the U.S. and Newcomer of the Year in a TV Series Broadcast in the U.S.
