= Derek Shepherd =

Fictional character in TV series Grey's Anatomy

- Grey's Anatomy character
- Patrick Dempsey as Derek Shepherd in 2012
- First appearance: "A Hard Day's Night" (1.01); March 27, 2005
- Last appearance: "You're My Home" (11.25); May 14, 2015 (as series regular) "Good as Hell" (17.13); April 22, 2021 (in dream-state)
- Created by: Shonda Rhimes
- Portrayed by: Patrick Dempsey

In-universe information
- Full name: Derek Christopher Shepherd
- Title: M.D. F.A.C.S.
- Occupation: Attending Neurosurgeon; Board Director; Chief of Surgery (Former); Head of Neurosurgery (Former); Director of The Brain Mapping Initiative (Former)
- Family: Christopher Shepherd (father; deceased); Carolyn Shepherd (née Maloney) (mother); Nancy Shepherd (sister); Kathleen Shepherd (sister); Liz Shepherd (sister); Amelia Shepherd (sister)
- Spouse: Addison Montgomery (m. 1994; div. 2006) (Note: Going, Going, Gone incorrectly places the year of their wedding as 1994, but the same episode also states Mark Sloan died in 2012, five years after Meredith's intern year ended. As Derek and Addison divorced after 12 years in Meredith's intern year, their wedding would have occurred in 1996.) Meredith Grey (m. 2009; until his death in 2015)
- Significant other: Rose (romance)
- Children: Miscarriage (with Meredith); Zola Grey Shepherd (adoptive daughter); Derek Bailey Shepherd (biological son); Ellis Alexandra Shepherd (biological daughter)
- Relatives: Adam (uncle; deceased); Christopher Shepherd (nephew; deceased); Britney Dickinson (aka Betty Nelson) (ex-niece); Scout Derek Shepherd Lincoln (nephew); Lucas Adams (nephew); Eleven unnamed nieces and nephews; Lexie (Alexandra) Grey (sister in law; deceased) Maggie (Margret) Pierce (sister in law)
- Born: 1966; New York
- Died: March 26, 2015 or April 23, 2015; Seattle, Washington
- Status: Deceased
- Alma mater: Bowdoin College; Columbia University

Derek Christopher Shepherd, often referred to as "McDreamy" for his attractiveness, is a fictional surgeon from the ABC medical drama Grey's Anatomy, portrayed by actor Patrick Dempsey. He made his first appearance in the series' pilot episode, "A Hard Day's Night", which was broadcast on March 27, 2005.

Derek was married to Addison Montgomery (Kate Walsh), but their relationship ended in divorce in 2007. Before his death in 2015, Derek was happily married to his longtime partner, Meredith Grey (Ellen Pompeo), with whom he had three children.

Derek served as the Chief of Surgery at Seattle Grace Mercy West Hospital (previously Seattle Grace Hospital, and later Grey Sloan Memorial Hospital). However, he abruptly resigned from the position in Season 7, following the traumatic hospital shooting.

For his portrayal of Derek Shepherd, Dempsey earned widespread recognition. He was nominated for the Golden Globe Award for Best Actor – Television Series Drama in both 2006 and 2007. Additionally, he also received a nomination for the Screen Actors Guild Award for Outstanding Performance by a Male Actor in a Drama Series.

== Storylines ==
Derek arrives at Seattle Grace Hospital and comes as the new Head of Neurosurgery from New York City. He is a Bowdoin College graduate and attended Columbia University College of Physicians and Surgeons alongside his childhood best friend Mark Sloan and ex-wife Addison Montgomery and Private Practice characters Naomi Bennett and Sam Bennett. Derek was a student of Dr. Richard Webber and was enticed to come with an "offer he couldn't refuse" – the position of Chief of Surgery, which he eventually turned down. He specializes in highly complex tumors and conditions of the brain and spine, and came to Seattle Grace with a reputation for taking on "lost causes" and "impossible" cases that most of his peers would turn down. As an attending, he is both well-liked by patients and his scrub nurses for his compassion and polite bedside manner and feared by interns and residents who are intimidated by his reputation and high standards. He is passionate about his job and has been known to expel staff or remove students (or at least threaten them) from his service for being disrespectful about patients or if he deems their attitude to be detrimental to his patient's well-being.

Derek first meets Meredith Grey at a bar and has a one-night stand with her. He soon finds out that she is an intern at Seattle Grace. They begin to have feelings for one another, and it causes some awkwardness at work particularly after her supervising resident Dr. Miranda Bailey discovers their relationship. While most of his family members accepted Meredith, his sister, Nancy, particularly disliked her and repeatedly called her "the slutty intern"; as of season nine she still refuses to speak to Meredith or acknowledge her as her sister-in-law. His mother Carolyn approved as she felt Meredith's gray perspective of life complemented Derek's tendency to see everything in black and white.

Derek's background was generally a mystery for the first season and source of speculation amongst his colleagues due to his sudden departure from an established and highly respected practice in New York. In the season one finale, his past eventually catches up with him when his estranged wife Addison moves to Seattle and is offered a position by Dr. Webber. Shortly after that, his childhood best friend Mark joins Seattle Grace as the new head of plastic surgery. Derek and Addison attempt to repair their marriage but attempts were futile. Addison and Derek each began their practice in New York City, which placed a strain on their marriage. Their marriage was troubled in the years leading to Derek's decision to leave New York as it is eventually revealed in both Grey's Anatomy and Private Practice that Derek's mother did not approve of her (choosing to give her dead husband's ring to Derek's second wife, Meredith Grey) and Addison's brother Archer disliked Derek. Addison's affair with Derek's best friend Mark Sloan drove the wedge even further and Derek's departure to Seattle. Addison briefly attempted to have a relationship with Mark, which resulted in her becoming pregnant. She then had an abortion soon after she discovered that Mark cheated on her, and as she was still in love with Derek. She then moved to Seattle. In the season eight episode "If/Then", Meredith dreams of an alternate universe where her mother never had Alzheimer's; Derek and Addison are still married, but their strained relationship and Shepherd's disillusionment causes his career to stagnate, earning him the nicknames "Bad Shepherd" and "McDreary".

When Derek is offered the Chief of Surgery position for the second time (season 6), he persuades the board to keep Dr. Webber on the staff. During the merger of Seattle Grace with Mercy West their relationship sours when Derek disagreed with Richard's handling of the merger and Richard begins to display uncharacteristic behavior. Derek learns from Meredith that Richard has since resumed drinking and feels forced to have him removed as Chief of Surgery. With mixed feelings, Derek offers him an ultimatum: go into rehab and pick up where he left off after, or retire from the hospital altogether. In the finale of season 6 Derek was shot by a deceased patients husband who killed two doctors Reed Adams and Charles Percy. Christina Yang then saves his life with and assist from Jackson Avery, Derek briefly had a reckless driving habit in the first two episodes of season 7 but stops when his wife Meredith grey reveals that she was pregnant the day of the shooting and had a miscarriage. Derek and Meredith then try to get pregnant and have children. When they went to the ob/gyn it was revealed that Meredith was infertile due to fibroids in the uterus so they used fertility drugs which after a season they stopped as they adopted Zola.

In seasons three and four, Meredith and Derek's relationship becomes rocky, and they each take time to date other people. Derek's plans to propose were ruined by a series of unfortunate events in season five. In the season finale, they decide to give their planned wedding to Alex and Izzie. Due to their tight schedule, they instead informally marry, and Derek writes down their "vows" on a post-it note. They legalize their marriage in season seven in order to adopt Zola, a young African orphan treated for spina bifida. They briefly separate after Meredith tampers with their Alzheimer's trial, jeopardizing her career and tarnishing Derek's reputation. Zola is taken away from Meredith after a social worker finds out she and Derek are living separately. Eventually, the social worker comes back and announces they are the official parents of Zola. As Meredith nears the end of her fifth year of residency, she and Derek are torn between staying at Seattle Grace Mercy West or leaving for Boston where Derek would work at Harvard while Meredith would be at the Brigham and Women's Hospital.

Following his rescue from the plane crash that killed Mark and Lexie, Derek learns that he may only regain 80 percent of his hand's function. He comes to terms with the fact that his career as a surgeon may be over and is grateful that he is alive. When Callie Torres (Sara Ramirez), head of orthopedic surgery, tells him a more risky surgery could give him back full function of his hand or reduce its function if it goes wrong, he agrees, accepting the possibility of never again holding a scalpel. Derek, Callie, and fellow resident, Jackson Avery, decide to do a nerve transplant for his hand. Meredith, newly pregnant with their second child, goes behind his back and calls his sisters so they can donate the nerve to him. Lizzie (Neve Campbell), Derek's younger sister, agrees to donate a nerve and the surgery is a success.

Meredith and Derek have child naturally in season 9, which they initially doubted would be carried to term because of Meredith's earlier infertility. Derek, Meredith, Callie, Arizona and Cristina then buy Seattle Grace Mercy West Hospital and name it Grey-Sloan after Lexie and Mark who died in a plane crash in season 8. In the season finale, Meredith gives birth to their son Derek Bailey Shepherd in a blackout due to a super storm. The baby required a c-section to be delivered safely, causing Derek to rush to the NICU with their newborn. Meredith then started bleeding out. Derek did not know if she was alive until later when Dr Bailey told Derek and Christina that Meredith survived the birth.

Derek and Meredith's marriage is strained after he accepted an invitation from the U.S. President to participate in the Brain-Mapping Initiative. He went back on his promise that he would not add to his current workload to devote time to their two young children and allow Meredith the chance to establish her career as a full-fledged attending. Eventually, he was offered a position at the National Institutes of Health in Washington, D.C., but Meredith puts her foot down and refuses to leave her hometown and uproot their young family. His youngest sister Amelia (Caterina Scorsone) takes over his position at Grey Sloan as Head of Neurosurgery. Meanwhile, he and Meredith fight bitterly off and on over whether they should move. After a tense argument, he accepts the job in the heat of the moment and leaves for Washington D.C. While there, he and Meredith talk things out over the phone and come to a mutual conclusion that they both did not want to end their marriage. He tells her that just being with her, raising their children and operating on patients was more satisfying than "saving the world".

In season 11, Derek is involved in a fatal car accident while driving to the airport for his final trip to Washington. He can hear and process auditory input but is unable to speak. He is recognized by Winnie, one of the victims of a crash he assisted in earlier, who tells the surgeons that their patient's name is Derek and that he is a surgeon as well. The hospital he is taken to is understaffed and under-equipped, and his head injury is not detected quickly enough by the arrogant doctors and inexperienced interns on duty that night; although one intern does suspect Derek had a head injury, her superior repeatedly shuts down her attempts to get him a head CT, prioritizing his abdominal bleeding beforehand and having him rushed into surgery even though he is stable enough for the CT. Although the neurosurgeon on call is paged multiple times after the doctors finally discover the head injury, he takes too long to arrive, and Derek is declared brain dead. Police arrive at Meredith's door and take her to see Derek, where she consents to remove him from life support. At the time of his death, Meredith is pregnant with their third child. After quietly leaving Seattle, she gives birth to a daughter whom she names Ellis after her mother.

Derek was mentioned or referenced several times in season 12 as the other characters struggle to cope with his sudden death. In the episode "My Next Life", Meredith had a flashback of their first ever surgery together when a patient named Katie Bryce was admitted to the hospital with a brain aneurysm. Amelia took his death especially hard as he was the sibling she was closest to. At the end of the season, before her wedding to Derek's long-time colleague Owen Hunt, Amelia goes on a nervous rant about how Derek was supposed to be the one to give her away, him having given away their three other sisters at their weddings. In "The Room Where It Happens", he appears briefly towards the end of the episode and smiles as he says "Hi" to a tired/reminiscing Meredith as she is scrubbing out after a challenging surgery with Hunt and Edwards on a patient with a torn up liver. In Season 15, Episode 6, "Flowers Grow Out of my Grave", Derek appears as Meredith is leaving the hospital at the end of her shift. This is after she has walked past several other characters that had passed away throughout the seasons. He smiles and says "Hey" and Meredith pulls her phone out to make a call instead of turning around. In season 17, he appears in a dream sequence on a beach as Meredith fights COVID-19 which leaves her comatose and thus experiencing an "afterlife" reality. Wanting to be with Derek, Derek informs her it's not her time to go and Meredith eventually wakes up, leaving Derek at the beach as he waves good-bye to her.

== Development ==
=== Casting and creation ===
When Patrick Dempsey auditioned for the role of Derek Shepherd, he was initially afraid that he wouldn't land the part. However, Grey's Anatomy creator Shonda Rhimes was immediately convinced: "The very first time I met him, I was absolutely sure that he was my guy. Reading the lines of Derek Shepherd, Patrick had a vulnerable charm that I just fell for. And he had amazing chemistry with Ellen Pompeo." Rhimes later revealed that Dempsey's dyslexia initially caused some hesitation during the first table readings: "I did not know about Patrick's dyslexia in the beginning. I actually thought that he didn't like the scripts from the way he approached the readings. When I found out, I completely understood his hesitation. Now that we all know, if he is struggling with a word, the other actors are quick to step up and help him out. Everyone is very respectful."

Isaiah Washington, who eventually portrayed Preston Burke, also auditioned for the role of Derek Shepherd. Reflecting on the experience, Washington said his reaction to not getting the part was like "I'd been kicked in the stomach by 14 mules." Another actor considered for the role was Rob Lowe, who turned it down in favor of starring in the short-lived CBS medical drama Dr. Vegas. Kyle MacLachlan also auditioned for the role. Some of Shepherd's medical cases on the show were based on real-life patients of Steve Giannotta, Chair of Neurological Surgery at the University of Southern California Keck School of Medicine, whom Rhimes consulted for inspiration.

In January 2014, Dempsey signed a two-year contract to stay on Grey's Anatomy, securing his presence through potential seasons 11 and 12. However, in April 2015, his character was unexpectedly killed off, even though his contract had not yet ended. Dempsey commented on his exit, saying, "It just evolved. It's just kind of happened. It was surprising that it unfolded, and it just naturally came to be, which was pretty good. I like the way it has all played out."

In August 2015, Rhimes commented:

The decision to have the character die the way that he did was not a difficult one in the sense of what were the options? Either Derek was going to walk out on Meredith, and leave her high and dry, and what would that mean? That was going to suggest that the love was not true, the thing we had said for 11 years was a lie and McDreamy wasn't McDreamy. For me, that was untenable. Meredith and Derek's love had to remain Meredith and Derek's love. As painful as it was for me as a storyteller, because I had never really thought that was going to happen, it preserved what felt true to me, was that Derek was going to have to die in order for that love to remain honest. Because I really couldn't have the idea that he just turned out to be a bad guy who walked out on his wife and kids be a true story. To me, it felt like that was the only way to make Meredith and Derek's magic remain true and forever frozen in time.

The character was later written to be a graduate of Bowdoin College, a liberal arts college in Brunswick, Maine. This change came after an alumnus of Bowdoin led a petition, signed by over 450 students, to "adopt" the character as an alumnus. Interestingly, Patrick Dempsey himself hails from Lewiston, Maine, located just 18 miles from Brunswick. In 2013, Dempsey was awarded an honorary doctorate by Bowdoin College.

On November 12, 2020, Dempsey reprised his role as Derek in a dream sequence during the two-part season 17 premiere of Grey's Anatomy. He appeared in several more episodes throughout the season, marking a brief but memorable return to the series.

=== Characterization ===
Rhimes described Derek Shepherd as the quintessential "Prince Charming". He was envisioned as a doctor who lives in his "own" universe, with little regard for the world around him, and exudes high sex appeal. Rhimes wanted him to be a man who was charming, devilishly handsome, and the type of guy every girl dreams of—a man who could also make wrong decisions, be perceived as a jerk, or be the ultimate heartbreaker. Rhimes intended for this character to be dynamic and easily adaptable to various storylines, knowing that viewers would fall in love with him despite his flaws.

Robert Bianco of USA Today noted the complexity of Derek's character, stating: "Derek could, at times, seem like two people, warm and funny one minute, cold and self-involved the next. Patrick Dempsey's gift was in making those two sides seem like part of the same person, while keeping us rooting for that person as a whole."

== Reception ==
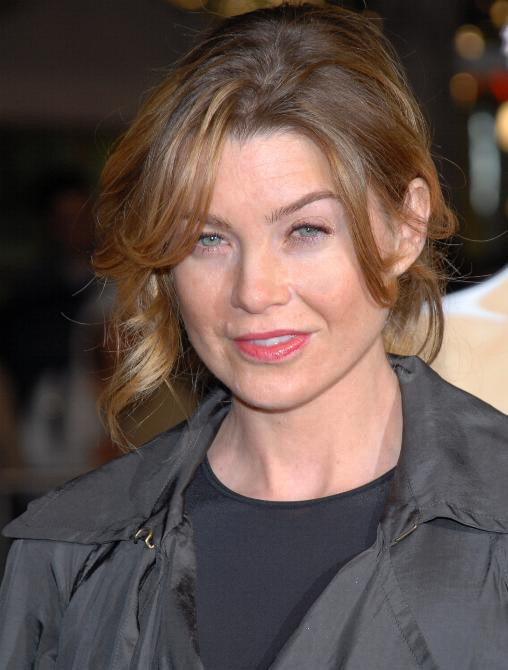
Shepherd's relationship with Meredith Grey (Ellen Pompeo) has been the highlight of the series since its inception.

At the end of Season 2, Robert Bianco of USA Today suggested that Dempsey could be considered for an Emmy due to the "seemingly effortless way he humanizes Derek's 'dreamy' appeal with ego and vanity." However, Alan Sepinwall of The Star-Ledger was more critical of Derek in Season 3, particularly regarding his moral contradictions. Sepinwall wrote: "The attempt to give the moral high ground back to McDreamy was bad. Dude, whatever happened in New York ceased to count once you agreed to take Addison back. You're the one who cheated on her, and still you act like her getting back together with Mark justifies what you did?"

In Season 4, Debbie Chang of BuddyTV commented on Derek's immaturity, noting: "The only character who did not make me love him was Derek Shepherd. Yes, his love for Meredith torments him, but that does not give him the right to lash out at her when his clinical trial patients are dying. If things don't go absolutely the way he wants, then he refuses to cooperate. How immature can this man possibly be?"

Entertainment Weekly placed Derek in its list of the "30 Great TV Doctors and Nurses." He was also featured in Wetpaint's "10 Hottest Male Doctors on TV" and BuzzFeed's "16 Hottest Doctors On Television." His iconic relationship with Meredith Grey (Ellen Pompeo) was named one of TV Guide's "Best TV Couples of All Time."

Derek's friendship with Mark Sloan (Eric Dane) was also acclaimed, with Victor Balta of Today listing their bond in the "TV's Best Bromances." He described them as "the most exciting couple on Grey's," thanks to their "easy chemistry" and their ability to deliver "great comic relief" with their banter and wisdom. Their bromance was also included in various lists by About.com, BuddyTV, Cosmopolitan, Wetpaint. However, following the announcement of Dane's upcoming departure from the show, Mark Perigard of the Boston Herald disagreed, stating that Derek and Mark "never clicked like you'd expect friends would," calling their scenes together "uncomfortable" and "forced".
