= Meredith Grey =

Fictional character in TV series Grey's Anatomy

- Grey's Anatomy and Station 19 character
- Promotional image
- First appearance: "A Hard Day's Night" (1.01); March 27, 2005
- Created by: Shonda Rhimes
- Portrayed by: Ellen Pompeo Flashbacks: Nicolette Collier; Claire Geare; Aria Leabu

In-universe information
- Titles: M.D.; FACS
- Occupation: Surgical intern (1–3); Surgical resident (4–8); General surgeon (9–present); Board Director (9–17); Chief of General Surgery (12-18); Director of Residency (17–18); Chief of Surgery (18–19)
- Family: Ellis Grey (mother; deceased); Thatcher Grey (father; deceased); Susan Grey (stepmother; deceased); Lexie Grey (paternal half-sister; deceased); Molly Grey-Thompson (paternal half-sister); Maggie Pierce (maternal half-sister); Laura Thompson (niece); Winston Ndugu (former brother-in-law via Maggie); Eric Thompson (brother-in-law); Amelia Shepherd (sister-in-law); Lucas Adams (nephew, via Derek); Scout Derek Shepherd Lincoln (nephew, via Amelia)
- Spouse: Derek Shepherd (m. 2009; died 2015)
- Significant others: Steve Murphy (one-night-stand); Finn Dandridge (ex-boyfriend); George O'Malley (one-night-stand; deceased); William Thorpe (one-night-stand); Nathan Riggs (ex-boyfriend); Andrew DeLuca (ex-boyfriend; deceased); Cormac Hayes (dated briefly); Nick Marsh (fiancé, 2026)
- Children: Miscarriage; Zola Grey-Shepherd (adoptive daughter); Derek Bailey Shepherd (biological son); Ellis Shepherd (biological daughter)
- Nationality: American
- Alma mater: Dartmouth College (MD)
- Born: 1978

Meredith Grey MD, FACS, (born 1978) is the fictional titular character from the medical drama television series Grey's Anatomy, which airs on the American Broadcasting Company (ABC) in the United States. The character was created by series producer Shonda Rhimes and is portrayed by actress Ellen Pompeo. Meredith made her first appearance in the pilot episode, "A Hard Day's Night", broadcast on March 27, 2005. She also appears in the spin-off series Station 19 as a recurring character.

Meredith is the series' protagonist and was introduced as a surgical intern at the fictional Seattle Grace Hospital (later Seattle Grace-Mercy West Hospital, and afterward Grey Sloan Memorial). She eventually obtains the position of a surgical resident, and later, the position of an attending surgeon. In 2016, she attains the Chief of General Surgery position. As the daughter of world-renowned surgeon Ellis Grey (Kate Burton), Meredith struggles with balancing the challenges of being in a competitive profession, maintaining her relationship with her one-night stand and eventual husband, Derek Shepherd (Patrick Dempsey), her role as a mother, and her friendships with her colleagues. Her relationships with colleagues Cristina Yang (Sandra Oh), Izzie Stevens (Katherine Heigl), Alex Karev (Justin Chambers) and George O'Malley (T. R. Knight) often referred to as MAGIC, form a central part of the show's early dynamics.

Meredith serves as the narrator of the show and is the focal point of most episodes, though other characters' perspectives are also explored. Pompeo's on-screen chemistry with Dempsey has been celebrated as a high point of the series. Rhimes has described Meredith as someone who does not believe in absolute good or bad, but rather does what she feels is right. Meredith Grey has been positively received by critics, with Alessandra Stanley of The New York Times calling her "the heroine of Grey's Anatomy".

Pompeo's performance as Meredith has been well received throughout the series, leading to worldwide popularity for the character. Pompeo has been nominated for multiple awards, including the Golden Globe Award for Best Actress – Television Series Drama and Satellite Award for Best Actress – Television Series Drama (both in 2007). She earned several nominations for the People's Choice Awards for Best Actress, winning in 2013 and 2015. She even became the highest paid actress on television in 2018.

== Fictional biography ==
=== Background ===
Meredith Grey is the daughter of world-renowned attending general surgeon, Ellis Grey (Kate Burton), and grew up in her shadow. Ellis was a deeply flawed and neglectful mother. She moved a five-year-old Meredith from Seattle to Boston where she lost all contact with her father.

Meredith is a graduate of Dartmouth College. While in college, she led a hedonistic lifestyle. Conflicts with her mother and her lack of support made Meredith question her decision to attend medical school. That indecision led her to leave for Europe once she graduated. However, after a month abroad, Meredith was called back to care for her mother, who had developed early-onset Alzheimer's disease. This news drove Meredith's decision to obtain her M.D.

=== Storylines ===
The night before Meredith's internship begins, she has a one-night stand with Derek Shepherd (Patrick Dempsey). She discovers the next day that he is the head of neurosurgery at her new workplace, Seattle Grace Hospital.

Meredith is assigned to work under resident Miranda Bailey (Chandra Wilson), and befriends her fellow interns, Cristina Yang (Sandra Oh), Izzie Stevens (Katherine Heigl), Alex Karev (Justin Chambers) and George O'Malley (T.R. Knight). She is particularly close with Cristina, who becomes her best friend and "person". Though she initially thinks poorly of him, Alex also evolves into Meredith's "person" and the two assume a sibling-esque familial relationship.

Meredith has a conflicted relationship with Richard Webber (James Pickens Jr.), the Chief of Surgery at Seattle Grace. Richard had an affair with Ellis when Meredith was a child. He often assumes a fatherly role towards her which she initially resents.

Meredith resists Derek's advances at the beginning of her internship, but is eventually charmed into starting a relationship with him despite misgivings about an intern dating an attending. She is, therefore, shocked by the arrival of Addison Montgomery (Kate Walsh), Derek's wife, unaware that he was married. When Derek decides to return to Addison, Meredith is devastated and falls back on old habits.

She tries to resolve some issues by searching for her long-absent father, Thatcher Grey (Jeff Perry). The two do not become close, but she becomes fond of her stepmother. Meredith spirals further when Ellis is admitted to the hospital, revealing her mother's diagnosis to her colleagues, as well as her verbally abusive tendencies. Meredith's self-destructive behavior peaks when she saves a patient with a bomb inside them by impulsively inserting her hand into their chest to keep the bomb still until it can be removed.

Meredith has a series of one-night stands, including one with George, who has long been in love with her. When she cries in the middle of their encounter, their friendship temporarily ends. Meredith swears off her behavior, agrees to be friends with Derek, and embarks on a relationship with veterinarian Finn Dandridge (Chris O'Donnell). Derek regrets his decision to return to his wife, and Meredith eventually realizes that Derek is the one, and the two of them get back together.

When Ellis experiences a rare, completely lucid day and expresses her immense disappointment at how ordinary Meredith has turned out to be, Meredith becomes depressed. During a ferryboat accident, Meredith is knocked into the water and drowns. She awakens in an "afterlife", where she interacts with deceased former acquaintances. In this limbo state, she confesses there was a moment where she thought what the point was in going on, and she momentarily gave up. Ellis dies in the interim, and Meredith meets with her mother, who tells her that she is anything but ordinary, before Meredith is brought back to life in the hospital.

Derek distances himself from Meredith as a result of her recklessness, prompting her to seek therapy to address her problems. She nearly fails her intern exam after a drunken Thatcher publicly blames her for the death of his wife Susan. Webber gives her a second chance to do the exam, saving her from destroying her career.

During her therapy sessions with psychiatrist Dr. Katharine Wyatt (Amy Madigan), she explores several things like her relationship with Derek among other problems. In these sessions, Dr. Wyatt explored the possibility that due to Ellis’ neglectful behaviour towards Meredith, it caused her to assume a form of passive suicidal ideation, which was why she was so reckless with anything regarding her mortality (like her drowning in the bay and when she stuck her hand in a body with an active bomb). Additionally, Meredith also reveals that Ellis attempted suicide by slitting her wrists after being rejected by Richard, but she ended up realising due to the intricacy of the way she cut herself and her surgical intellect of human anatomy, Ellis’ suicide attempt was a cry for Richard’s attention, who didn’t find out about her suicide attempt until Meredith told him.

After Meredith is promoted to a resident, her younger half-sister, Lexie Grey (Chyler Leigh), begins working at Seattle Grace as an intern. Meredith initially rejects Lexie's attempts to form a relationship, but slowly softens towards her.

Meredith later initiates a neurosurgical clinical trial, enlisting Derek as a consulting neurosurgeon. The trial fails repeatedly, but the final patient they treat survives, prompting them to reunite and move in together. Eventually, Derek and Meredith decide to marry, but on their wedding day, the pair give away their wedding ceremony to Izzie and Alex. Meredith and Derek instead marry by writing their wedding vows on a post-it note. Meredith then spends a month out of commission after donating part of her liver to Thatcher.

Meredith experiences another immense trauma after the hospital is put under lockdown from an active mass shooter seeking revenge against Derek. Meredith offers her own life in exchange for his and miscarries her baby during the crisis. She goes through this traumatic experience with Cristina, who operates on Derek while threatened at gunpoint, and Meredith tries to support her friend afterwards as best she can.

Meredith decides to actively try to become pregnant, but learns that she has a "hostile uterus". Meredith opts to work on Derek's clinical trial for curing Alzheimer's and she appears to be leaning towards a neuro specialty, but she endangers the trial by tampering with the drugs in an effort to help Webber's wife.

She and Derek decide to adopt Zola, an orphaned baby from Malawi, and make their marriage legal. When the truth about Meredith's tampering comes out, however, a furious Derek tells her he cannot raise a child with her because of her moral ambiguity. Meredith is fired and her behavior leads to Zola being taken away. She and Derek reconcile eventually, Meredith chooses a general surgery specialty over neuro, and they successfully fight to get Zola back.

Meredith takes the medical boards while sick with the flu. She decides to accept a job offer at The Brigham and Women's Hospital as the next step in her career. During a flight to undertake a prestigious surgery, Meredith, Derek, Cristina, and Lexie, among others, are involved in an aviation accident. Lexie dies in the accident, causing heavy grief to fall upon Meredith as the group is left stranded in the forest. Following their rescue, Meredith becomes an attending general surgeon at Seattle Grace, now Seattle Grace Mercy West.

Meredith's strict attitude and sarcasm lead to her being dubbed "Medusa" by the hospital's new batch of interns. Meredith, along with the other victims of the plane crash, receives $15 million in compensation from the hospital for their negligence. To prevent the hospital from going into bankruptcy, Meredith helps buy the hospital and becomes a member of the newly renamed Grey Sloan Memorial Hospital board of directors. She also asks Dr. Bailey to perform gene mapping on her to finally learn whether she has Alzheimer's genes like her mother. She tests positive for more than one of the genetic markers for the disease.

After construction is completed, Meredith moves with Derek into their dream house. She also discovers that she is pregnant with Derek's child once again. Meredith suffers a near miscarriage after falling down the stairs and her baby is delivered via emergency C-section. Her baby is born in a superstorm blackout. In the aftermath, Meredith diagnoses herself as being in disseminated intravascular coagulation and Dr Shane Ross starts an exploratory laparotomy. Dr. Bailey then performs a spleen removal on her, which saves her life. In return, Meredith and Derek name their son Derek Bailey Shepherd, with him going by his middle name.

Meredith and Cristina have a huge rift when Cristina confirms Meredith's fears by stating that Meredith's skills have fallen behind Cristina's due to her familial obligations. Meredith and Derek come to an agreement that he will take a step back to take care of the children and allow her to develop her career. Meredith attempts to regain some ground by starting a promising research trial 3D-printing portal veins. The conflict between Cristina and Meredith widens when Cristina commandeers Meredith's resources for her own trial. They later repair their relationship before Cristina moves to Switzerland.

As Meredith adjusts to life without Cristina, she finds out she has a maternal half-sister named Maggie Pierce (Kelly McCreary), who was given away for adoption by her mother and who is now working in Grey Sloan Memorial. Meredith retrieves repressed childhood memories of her mother being pregrant, and eventually chooses to accept Maggie and begin building a relationship.

Meanwhile, Meredith and Derek's marriage becomes strained. She does not want to uproot their young family to move across the country for his career at the sacrifice of her own. Meredith ultimately encourages Derek to go work in Washington, D.C., and he promptly leaves. Meredith proceeds to lean on her friends for support while simultaneously maintaining a streak of successful surgeries with no patient losses. Meredith and Derek agree to work things out over the phone. Meredith privately admits to Alex that she has realized that she could live independently of Derek, but chooses not to.

Just as Meredith and Derek begin to rekindle their relationship, Derek is suddenly killed in a car accident. He is declared brain dead at an understaffed hospital, and Meredith consents to removing him from life support. Following the funeral service, Meredith impulsively packs up her belongings and leaves with the children for Boston. Months pass by with parallels showing similarities in Meredith's and Ellis' lives; Meredith eventually give birth to a daughter alone like Ellis did. She names her newborn daughter after her mother. With Alex's support, she returns to Seattle with the children and is later appointed Chief of General Surgery by Bailey. She sells the "dream house" and moves back to her mother's house where she lives with Maggie and Amelia Shepherd (Caterina Scorsone), her sister-in-law that she considers as much of a sister as Maggie.

Having settled back into life in Seattle, Meredith hosts a dinner party where her friend Callie Torres's (Sara Ramirez) new girlfriend Penny Blake (Samantha Sloyan) is revealed to be the intern who worked on Derek the night he died. Meredith is upset after she finds out Penny will be working at Grey Sloan Memorial. Over time, however, she decides to effectively train Penny to be a better surgeon and forgives her. Alex and Meredith continue their close, sibling-like relationship of being each other's "person" after Cristina's departure. He supports her when she is violently attacked by a disoriented patient, while she supports him through his legal difficulties.

Meredith recovers enough to start seeing Nathan Riggs (Martin Henderson), although their relationship is complicated by the fact that Maggie confesses to Meredith that she has feelings for Riggs. Additionally, Meredith is not ready to declare their relationship formally or publicly. Eventually, she accepts her relationship with Riggs, but it is complicated again by the unexpected return of Owen's sister, Megan Hunt (Abigail Spencer), Riggs' fiancée, which ultimately ends their budding romance.

Afterwards, Meredith is nominated for a Harper Avery Award for her groundbreaking abdominal transplant surgery on Megan. After failing to attend the awards ceremony to stay for a medical trauma, Meredith learns with all her closest friends in the OR and gallery that she has won the Harper Avery Award. After her win, Meredith throws herself into her work and is chosen to continue her project by the hospital's research contest. However, she is dragged back into her mother's past, as she meets Ellis' former best friend, Marie, who she had a falling out with. Eventually, Meredith discovers what happened in the past and is able to repair some of the damage.

During Jo and Alex's wedding that Meredith ends up officiating, she is kissed by a drunken Andrew DeLuca (Giacomo Gianniotti), and the two brush it off. Meredith starts dating again and she is pursued by Andrew, who realized he had feelings for her. Meredith also gets interest from Atticus Lincoln (Chris Carmack), a new orthopedic surgeon, and briefly finds herself in another love triangle. During her romantic dilemma, her estranged father, Thatcher, passes away, though they are able to make peace before his death. Eventually, Meredith chooses Andrew, and the two begin a relationship. Meredith breaks the hospital record for the longest single surgery and then begins research on an ingestible diagnostic device.

While treating an underprivileged patient, Meredith commits insurance fraud to help her. When the hospital starts investigating the case, Andrew takes the blame so that Meredith will not be sent to prison and separated from her kids. Meredith visits Andrew in jail, telling him that she loves him. She turns herself in and is sentenced to community service, while her medical license, though not revoked, is put in jeopardy. She misses a court date and neglects to perform some of the hours, leading to a temporary stay in jail. After a hearing is conducted, Meredith is able to keep her license and is rehired at Grey Sloan.

On Meredith's first day back, she meets Cormac Hayes (Richard Flood), the new Chief of Pediatrics, who she later learns has been sent to her by Cristina. Hayes and Meredith grow closer and bond over their shared loss of a spouse. Andrew begins showing signs of mania, possibly brought on by bipolar disorder, and he breaks up with Meredith when she expresses concern. Shortly after her breakup with Andrew, Meredith learns that Alex left Seattle to be with Izzie and he will not be returning.

During the COVID-19 pandemic, Meredith is stressed while coping with the high rate of deaths. She ultimately contracts COVID-19, and while she fights for her life, she goes in and out of consciousness. During her fever dreams, which take place on a beach, she encounters several loved ones in the afterlife, including Derek, George, Andrew and Lexie. Meredith eventually recovers and gets strong enough to begin operating again. At the same time, she also takes over Richard's position as Residency Program Director.

Meredith is offered the opportunity to work on a cure for Parkinson's disease. Despite some uncertainty, she agrees to the offer on the condition that she can do the research both in Seattle and Minnesota, where the trial is located. It is also revealed that she and Hayes briefly dated, but decided to hold off on their relationship because of problems with Hayes' son. During her time in Minnesota, Meredith runs into her former patient, a transplant surgeon named Nick Marsh (Scott Speedman). They bond over being miracles of medicine and start dating.

Meredith begins splitting her time between Minnesota and Seattle, putting a strain on her relationship with Bailey that worsens when she is offered a full-time position at the Mayo Clinic. Meredith prepares herself and the kids for a move to Minnesota, but her plans are halted when Bailey resigns and appoints her as the new Chief of Surgery. In the chaos, Meredith tells Nick to go back to Minnesota without her and breaks up with him.

As Chief, Meredith rebuilds the halted residency program at Grey Sloan. Later, she receives an offer to work in Boston at the Fox Foundation to research Alzheimer's disease. Meredith and her kids move to Boston while she maintains a long-distance relationship with Nick, before he eventually joins them. Her research takes a direction that puts her in conflict with her boss, Catherine Avery (Debbie Allen). Meredith is eventually forced to surrender all of her previous findings to the Fox Foundation, while she continues researching independently. She clashes with neurosurgeon Tom Koracick (Greg Germann), who has taken over her role at the Fox Foundation.

=== Personality ===
Meredith is described as a "dark and twisty", damaged woman who sees the world in varying shades of grey. Because of this, she is an emotionally complex person. She is capable of empathizing with others when they are at their lowest points and is a sensitive observer of the people around her.

At different times in her life, Meredith has suffered from various self-destructive behaviors and mental illnesses influenced by her life circumstances: excessive drinking, promiscuity, depression and suicidal ideation. As she found more stability in her life, she became happier and more dependable, able to withstand traumas without resorting to bad habits. She continues to act impulsively at times, putting her career and even life in danger when she feels like it is the right thing to do.

Meredith has a habit of "collecting strays", and allows her friends and coworkers to live in the house her mother left her. The friends she cohabitates with become her chosen family. Meredith is endlessly loyal to her loved ones, and will bend the traditional rules of morality or professional protocol to keep them safe.

As a spouse, surgeon, and mother, Meredith cites a number of times that she does not want to be like either of her parents: her unambitious father had followed her mother around pathetically before she left him, while her mother valued her career over her family. Meredith is frequently conflicted trying to balance between the two, and fears her family are hindering her medical aspirations as much as she fears becoming like her mother whenever she is tempted to choose surgery over family.

=== Abilities and skills ===
Having grown up around hospitals, Meredith has an affinity for healthcare settings. She has the ability to stay calm during medical procedures and emergencies, is a good observer and is skilled at making her patients feel comfortable. She also is skilled at catching subtle hints and accurately determining difficult-to-catch diagnoses of diseases. She is a very skilled surgeon, shows a talent for medical research trials and is effective dealing with psychologically damaged patients.

Despite her initial callous treatment of residents after becoming an attending, Meredith grows into a well-respected and caring mentor, assembling a generation of interns that were considered failures and seeing their potential.

Meredith's medical specialty is general surgery. Despite this, she has participated in several clinical trials and research opportunities concerning neurological conditions. One of her main focuses is curing Alzheimer's disease. Meredith has proven herself as a capable general surgery attending, Chief of General Surgery and Chief of Surgery, eventually winning a Harper Avery award for her work.

== Development ==
=== Casting and creation ===
Ellen Pompeo discovered Grey's Anatomy during a period of inactivity in her acting career. Her agent suggested she audition, along with other projects she was considering at the time. While casting actresses for the role of Meredith Grey, the series' creator Shonda Rhimes remarked: "I kept saying we need a girl like that girl from Moonlight Mile (2002), and after a while, they were like, 'We think we can get that girl from Moonlight Mile'. I spent time with her and got to know her, and then we started casting for the men". Rhimes admitted that casting Meredith was challenging due to the role's strong verbal requirements. She later learned that the actress in question was Pompeo, who already had a deal in place with ABC, having tested for a pilot on the network. Although there was speculation that Pompeo was the first to be cast for the show, Pompeo herself said she was unsure of this.

When asked about creating Meredith's character, Rhimes explained:

[I was] in my pajamas at home, which is where I spent a lot of time writing. I kept asking myself, 'What kind of woman should the heroine be?' I thought she should be someone who had made some big mistakes. As it turns out, Meredith also has another problem: She is trying to live up to her mother's renowned career in surgery. Meredith is the daughter of a mother who basically never spent any time with her—the daughter of a mother who now has Alzheimer's and doesn't even remember her.

Pompeo was cast as the titular character, with Mary McNamara of the Los Angeles Times describing Meredith as "a prickly, independent sort whose ambition, and ambivalence, is fueled by the fact that her mother was a gifted surgeon and now suffers from Alzheimer's". Meredith also serves as the show's narrator, drawing comparisons to Carrie Bradshaw (Sarah Jessica Parker), the narrator and protagonist of Sex and the City.

When Pompeo's initial contract expired, she successfully negotiated a new one, securing a salary of $200,000 per episode, making her and Patrick Dempsey the highest-paid cast members at the time. In 2012, Forbes recognized Pompeo as the eighth highest-paid actress on television, earning $275,000 per episode for her role.

Pompeo's second contract expired after Season 8, sparking rumors that she might leave the series. However, in September 2011, she stated that she was open to the idea of extending her contract if invited. She told TV Guide, "I would never turn up my nose at Grey's Anatomy. As long as the stories are honest and truthful, and Patrick [Dempsey] and I feel there is material for us to be passionate about, it still beats a 9-to-5 job any day. If I hear from the fans that they want us to keep going, then I would continue because we owe them everything." In May 2012, E! Online reported that Pompeo, along with all original cast members, had signed on for two more years. HuffPost confirmed that season nine was officially renewed, securing Pompeo's return.

Pompeo's contract expired again after Season 12, but she signed another extension to continue starring in the show for its Season 13. Under this new contract, Pompeo earned $300,000 per episode, according to Deadline Hollywood.

On January 17, 2018, ABC announced that Pompeo's contract had been renewed through season 16. This new deal not only secured her return as Meredith Grey, but also elevated her role to producer of Grey's Anatomy and co-executive producer of the spin-off series. With this contract, Pompeo became the highest-paid actress on a dramatic TV series, earning $575,000 per episode and over $20 million per year. On May 10, 2019, Pompeo extended her contract through season 17 after ABC renewed the show for seasons 16 and 17.

=== Characterization ===
Whatever I come up with, [Pompeo] is always game to play. She's been so good at what she's done that I've just let the character do what I've wanted the character to do, which has been wonderful. She's managed to sell every single thing because she's truly believed it. The incredible thing is that you can have no fear to write what you think because she is always able to deliver.

— Executive producer Betsy Beers on developing Pompeo's character

Meredith Grey serves as the protagonist and focal point of Grey's Anatomy. She has been described by Grey's Anatomy executives as "intelligent, compassionate, hard-working, oftentimes outspoken, easily distracted, and indecisive". Ellen Pompeo has reflected on her character's evolving personality, noting that Meredith's journey has moved from a state of depression to one of relative happiness and being "fixed". When asked about Meredith's demeanor, Pompeo humorously remarked that she was not sure if Meredith even knew how to have fun, adding, "All of my scenes with [Patrick Dempsey] are the same—we're either breaking up or having sex".

The dynamic between Meredith Grey and Derek Shepherd became one of the show's core relationships, fueled by the chemistry between Pompeo and Patrick Dempsey. In an interview with Good Morning America, Pompeo acknowledged their strong on-screen connection, stating, "I am so incredibly lucky to have Patrick [Dempsey], to have the chemistry that we do. We have an amazing relationship, and it's like any other relationship—you have your ups and downs. But we work it out, and we've found a way to do this for this long, still get along, and make it work."

Despite their undeniable chemistry, Pompeo admitted to Entertainment Weekly that there were some awkward moments while filming romantic scenes, given the brother-sister dynamic she felt with Dempsey. She recalled, "It's awkward with Patrick because he's like my brother. As soon as the camera is off, I'm like, 'Is your hand on my butt?' But there are millions of girls who have been waiting for this, so I feel an obligation to the fans."

Throughout Season 2, Shonda Rhimes used the shared dog, "Doc", between Meredith and Derek as a metaphor for their relationship. The dog represented their complex and evolving dynamic as a couple. According to Rhimes, Meredith is characterized by doing what she believes is right, even when faced with difficult or morally ambiguous decisions. She characterizes Grey as doing what she thinks is right:

Meredith is the girl who put her hand on a bomb in a body cavity. Meredith is the girl who tried to help a serial killer kill himself, so that he could donate his organs. Meredith—and this is obvious—has a compass that has always led her to shades of grey. She does not believe in black-and-white, she does not believe in good or bad, she does what she thinks is right.

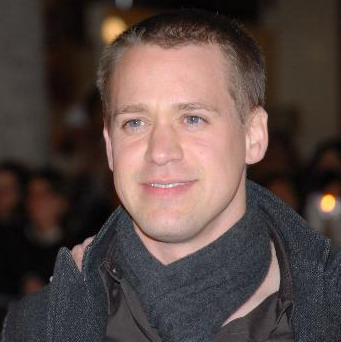
McKee deemed Grey and O'Malley's sexual encounter irreversible.

In Season 2, Meredith has a one-night stand with George O'Malley, an encounter that significantly impacts both characters. Series writer Stacy McKee commented on the consequences of this event, stating: "There's no turning back. There's nothing George and Meredith can do. The damage is done—things will never be the same. They've just changed something important in their lives FOREVER and...they are freaking out." The fallout from this moment created a ripple effect in their friendship, dramatically altering their dynamic and adding to Meredith's complex emotional journey.

Meredith's character development was also instrumental in shaping the creation of her half-sister, Lexie Grey. McKee drew parallels between the two characters, explaining that they both share similar motivations and desires. "Meredith and Lexie both want to succeed. They want to be strong. They want to feel normal. They want, so much, to be whole. But it's a struggle—a genuine struggle for them. Being hardcore doesn't come naturally. Sometimes, they have to fake it," McKee said. This common struggle between Meredith and Lexie showcases their deep emotional complexity and adds another layer to their sibling relationship, as both characters attempt to navigate their personal and professional lives while dealing with family trauma and the legacy of their mother, Ellis Grey.

Grey's personality has been compared with that of Alex Karev's. Rhimes offered the insight:

I like to create moments for him and Meredith. Because, in my head, they are very similar people. Even though Karev can be such an ass, even though he's arrogant, even though he gave O'Malley the Syph. He and Meredith are both lost, both lonely, both former screw-ups who got their acts together. In another lifetime, they would be really good friends. So throughout the season, we watch them pause from time to time to look at each other and see that they are mirrors of one another.

— Shonda Rhimes, Grey Matter

Pompeo has consistently advocated for a truthful and realistic storyline for her character, Meredith Grey, emphasizing that life's complexities cannot always be wrapped up neatly. She strives for authenticity in portraying Meredith's emotional journey, and this commitment has shaped many of her character's defining moments. Reflecting on one of Meredith's controversial actions—tampering with Derek Shepherd's clinical trial—Pompeo acknowledged the gravity of the act, saying: "Listen, what Meredith did clearly crossed a line. Derek has a right to be pissed". Despite the consequences, Shonda Rhimes remained confident that Grey and Shepherd were ultimately meant to be together, believing that they would find their way back to each other in the end.

Meredith's relationship with Cristina Yang has often been referred to as a "sisterhood". Cristina repeatedly calls Meredith "her person", signifying their deep emotional bond. The two were dubbed the "twisted sisters" for their shared emotional complexities and struggles. In the Season 3 finale, the duo even went on a "honeymoon" together, which Rhimes described as her favorite detail of the finale. Their relationship was an important anchor for both characters, representing a non-romantic partnership that was just as significant as any romantic relationship in the series.

I wanted to create a world in which you felt as if you were watching very real women. Most of the women I saw on TV didn't seem like people I actually knew. They felt like ideas of what women are. They never got to be nasty or competitive or hungry or angry. They were often just the loving wife or the nice friend. But who gets to be the bitch? Who gets to be the three-dimensional woman?

— Rhimes on the Cristina-Meredith friendship.

However, Meredith has also been criticized by some viewers for being "whiny", a perception that Rhimes addressed. She explained:

I've heard a lot of talk about Meredith being whiny but the truth is, she's got a mom [who died of] Alzheimer's, no other family to speak of, and the man she loves is married. She's pretty freaking lonely, people. She's got a right to get her whine on. So, when she falters, it's partly because she's got nothing to hang on to. As she says in the first episode, she needs a reason to go on, she needs some hope.

Rhimes also noted that by the show's 100th episode, Meredith had undergone significant evolution, transforming from the "dark and twisty girl" she was in the earlier seasons to a "happy woman". She remarked:

"She is the thing her mother wished for her. She is extraordinary. Because, to get past the crap of your past? To move on? To let the past go and change? That is extraordinary. To love? Without fear? Without screwing it up? That is extraordinary. It makes me happy to see her happy."

Following Patrick Dempsey's departure from the show, Rhimes acknowledged that the story was heading into "uncharted territory", stating that Meredith Grey and the rest of Grey's Anatomy were about to enter a new chapter of their lives, with endless possibilities for what might come. With Pompeo's contract still active, Rhimes hinted that viewers would witness some of the most challenging times of Meredith's life yet, opening up opportunities for the character's continued growth and resilience.

== Reception ==
=== Reviews ===
The character has received both overwhelmingly positive reviews and weary response from television critics throughout the course of the show. The initial response to the character was positive, but as the series progressed Meredith Grey became immensely popular and Pompeo established the character as a critic and fan favorite featuring on a number of Top TV Character lists. The development of the character has been deemed as the highlight of the show. Grey has constantly been defined as "the heroine of Grey's Anatomy". At the time of inception, Newsday's Diane Werts praised the character stating: "Like Hugh Laurie's irascible "House" title character, star Ellen Pompeo's newly minted Dr. Grey conveys such substance that you simply can't stop watching." After Pompeo not receiving an Emmy nomination for her work as Grey, McNamara of the Los Angeles Times suggested that Pompeo, "who has worked very hard and against all narrative odds to make Meredith Grey an interesting character at last" should have received a nomination at the 61st Primetime Emmy Awards. Later, during Season 12, Western Gazette gave Ellen Pompeo the credit for carrying the show and re-iterated it is "time for Pompeo to finally win an Emmy Award." Tanner Stransky of Entertainment Weekly referred to Grey as the "trusty voice-over master" of Grey's Anatomy.

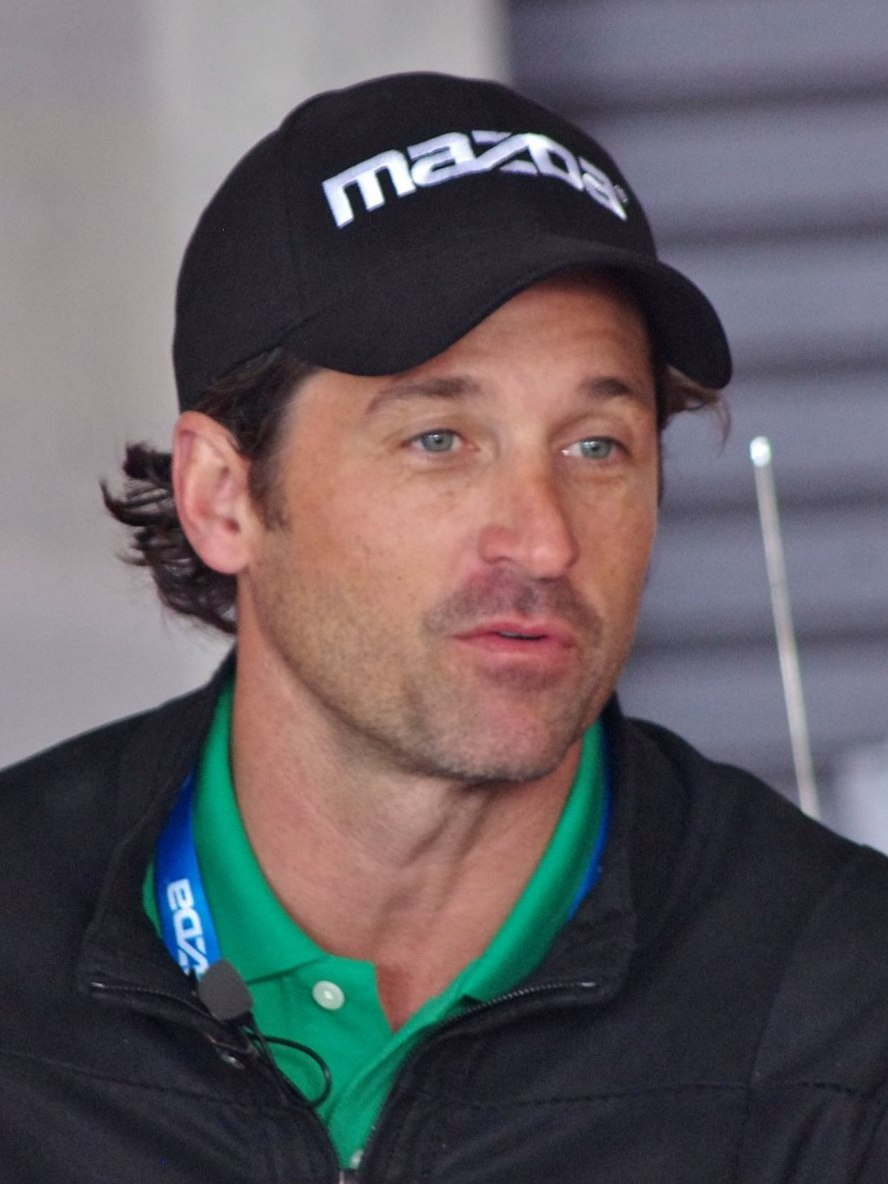
Pompeo's connection with Patrick Dempsey (Derek Shepherd) is widely acclaimed as a high point of the series.

Former television columnist for The Star-Ledger Alan Sepinwall expressed his boredom on the focus given on Grey's relationships storylines while reviewing the Season 2 finale: "On those occasions when Meredith's not involved in a plot about her love life, I do kind of like her, but those moments are so infrequent compared to her constant angsting over McDreamy – not to mention all those seemingly unrelated storylines that always turn into a metaphor for that relationship – that I really, really can't stand her." During Season 3, the development of the character received negative reviews, with Cristopher Monfette of IGN stating that her storyline has become "some bizarrely under-developed sub-plot about depression and giving Derek a season's worth of reconsidering to do." Also during the third season, Robert Rorke of the New York Post noted the decline in Meredith's role in the show, expressing disappointment: "She used to be the queen of the romantic dilemmas, but lately, she's been a little dopey, what with the endless McDreamy soliloquies." Similarly, Maclean's found their storyline in Season 4 overused, "This whole 'Oh I need more time', but 'Oh, I'm jealous if you look at someone else' angst was tired in the second season, frustrating in the third and now a total channel changer. The will-they-or-won't-they plot doesn't work because they've already been in and out of that relationship too many times. Meredith is a nag and McDreamy is henpecked". On a more positive note, her relationship with Shepherd was included in AOL TV's list of the "Best TV Couples of All Time" and in the same list by TV Guide.

During Season 6, the development of the character was praised, Glenn Diaz of BuddyTV commented that "You gotta love Mer when she's gloomy", in addition to praising Pompeo's performance. In her review of the episode "Tainted Obligation" she wrote "I felt for Meredith, but after Lexie's heartfelt begging and pleading, I was happy that Mere finally grows up and casts her selfishness aside. Three seasons ago, Meredith would never have dreamed of putting Lexie first, and I was proud of her for giving up part of her liver—her offer to get to know her dad was an even bigger milestone." Reviewing the first part of Season 8, TV Fanatic lauded the character and wrote: "this season belongs to Meredith Grey. She is the heart and soul of the show and has been outstanding. This is a character that used to be so dark and twisty and has now grown into a more mature woman. Ellen Pompeo has been at the top of her game this season."

Wit & Fancy praised the transformation of the character and stated, "Of course, Meredith will still make rash decisions like when she took off with Zola or tampered with the trial, but she does things out of love and the kindness of her heart now and not because she is dark and twisty. Considering where Meredith was at the beginning and where she is now, I think she went through a remarkable journey and did more than just growing up, she finally became 'all whole and healed".

Maura O'Malley of Bustle also lauded the development of the character ahead of Season 12 saying, "When the series began, Meredith was just a girl sitting in a bar celebrating the exciting next phase of her life. She had graduated medical school, she was starting her residency at a prestigious hospital, and she was simply looking for a no-strings attached, one night stand. What she got instead was a complicated romantic relationship that rivals Romeo and Juliet — but the key is, she wasn't searching for love. Working and learning were — and continue to be — her priorities, while McDreamy was simply an added perk. Hopefully, the new season of Grey's Anatomy will reflect this change in tone, because Meredith is a strong, independent woman — and she will be just fine."

Later in the series, Pompeo received critical acclaim with numerous critics lauding her portrayal of the character. Reviewing the Season 11 episode "She's Leaving Home", CarterMatt called her the "anchor" for Grey's saying, "Throughout, this was an episode completely anchored by Ellen Pompeo, who has done some of her best work ever on the show the past couple of weeks. Tonight, she cried, she fought, and she learned that she was carrying his child." and added that Pompeo is often "overlooked" saying, "Her subtlety is probably why she is often overlooked." Rick Porter of Zap2it reviewing "How to Save a Life" wrote, "Without Meredith, and without one of Pompeo's strongest performances in her long time on the show, "How to Save a Life" would have run the risk of coming across as a baldly manipulative death episode, the likes of which the show has done several times before. He added. "How to Save a Life" may not be the ideal Emmy submission episode for Pompeo, considering Meredith is off screen for more than half of it. But it's among the best work she's ever done on the show." USA Today also lauded Pompeo saying, "In some ways, the episode 'How to Save a Life' was even more of a showcase for Pompeo. She had some of the more memorable and well-played scenes, from her angry response to the doctor who tries to tell her what her choices are, to her resignation when she realizes she has to comfort and motivate the young doctor whose mistakes cost Derek his life."

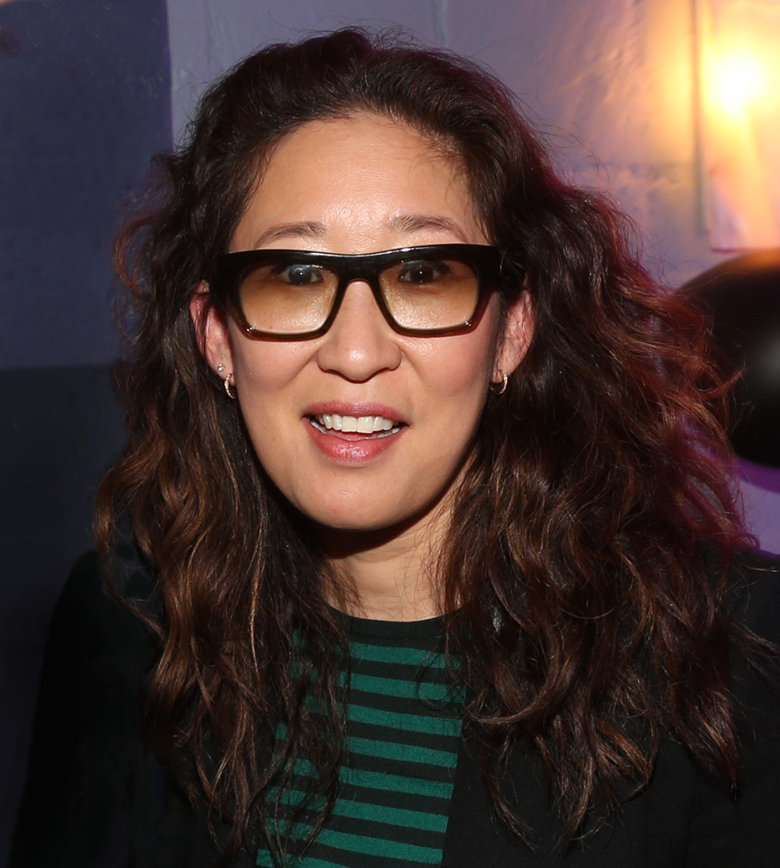
Mark Perigard of the Boston Herald considered Meredith's friendship with Cristina Yang (Sandra Oh) to be "the secret core of Grey's".

The relationship between Meredith and Cristina Yang has been acclaimed and been a highlight of the show. Mark Perigard of the Boston Herald considered the friendship to be "the secret core of Grey's". Aisha Harris of Slate called their relationship The Best Female Friendship on TV adding that "With those two characters, showrunner Shonda Rhimes and her team of writers created one of the most nuanced and realistic portrayals of female friendship on television." Samantha Highfill of Entertainment Weekly called Cristina and Meredith the best female friends on TV because "they don't try to be". There is nothing fake about them, which is a rarity in how female friends are portrayed on television. She further went on to call them 'soulmates', " And even though they'd never dare get sappy enough to say it, they're soul mates. Margaret Lyons of Vulture called the friendship " dream BFF relationship" and the primary focus of the show, "One of the series' calling cards has been its depiction of female friendship and particularly the primacy that friendship enjoyed over romantic relationships."

E! at the time of Sandra Oh's exit wrote, "In Grey's Anatomy's 10-year history, the doctor duo has been through a lot together: weddings, deaths, plane crashes, bomb threats, shooting, you name it, they've lived (and danced) through it. " and added, "And with the three words, 'You're my person', Cristina Yang and Meredith Grey solidified their status as the small screen's best best friends ever." Marama Whyte of Hypable wrote, "Critically, the key relationship in Meredith's life was not her romance with Derek Shepherd, but her passionate, indestructible, absolutely enviable friendship with Cristina. Talk about relationship goals; who wants McDreamy when Cristina Yang could be your person. These two were the real powerhouse, and Shonda Rhimes didn't shy away from making the audience remember this. Derek was the love of her life, but Cristina was her soul mate. More than anyone else, Cristina challenged Meredith, was honest with her and inspired her. For these reasons, it was Cristina who was constantly the source of Meredith's character development, not Derek."

Pompeo's character has also been used to define the image a strong woman, Bustle previewing Season 12 wrote, "Meredith Grey has always been capable of being on her own. Grey's Anatomy is about Meredith's journey. Men and romantic interests are a part of her life, but they are not the priority. She doesn't need McDreamy. Grey's Anatomy doesn't need McDreamy. So even if the writers do decide to create a new love interest for Ms. Grey (Martin Henderson, perhaps?), it wouldn't matter. I have faith that the show's writers will do this storyline justice, because TV needs more strong single women — and Meredith seems like the perfect candidate." The site added, "This past season was almost a trial run for a McDreamy-less Grey's Anatomy. When Derek left for Washington, D.C. to pursue his research, Meredith stayed behind and focused on her own career. She didn't chase him. Her priority were her children and the Grey Sloan Memorial Hospital. Meredith showed that she would never put aside her own dreams and aspirations for a man, and I believe that this won't change after Derek's death."

=== Awards ===
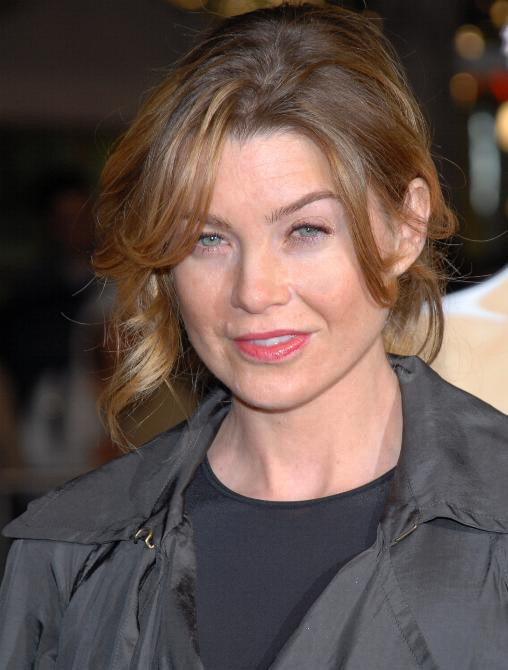
Critics have highlighted Pompeo's due for an Emmy Award on multiple occasions.

Ellen Pompeo has won and been nominated for multiple awards for her portrayal of Meredith Grey on Grey's Anatomy. She and the Grey's Anatomy cast won Best Cast – Television Series at the 2006 Satellite Awards. The following year, Pompeo was named Best Actress – Television Series Drama at the same ceremony. She was also part of the cast that was awarded the Outstanding Performance by an Ensemble in a Drama Series at the 13th Screen Actors Guild Awards in 2007, and received nominations in the same category in 2006 and 2008.

Pompeo's performance in the series earned her a nomination for the Golden Globe Award for Best Actress – Television Series Drama at the 64th Golden Globe Awards, where Grey's Anatomy won Best Drama Series. In 2007, Pompeo, along with the female cast and crew of Grey's Anatomy, received the Women in Film Lucy Award, which honors individuals whose work in television has positively influenced attitudes toward women.

Pompeo has also garnered significant recognition at the People's Choice Awards, winning Best Drama Actress at both the 39th and the 41st People's Choice Awards. She was consistently nominated for multiple categories at the People's Choice Awards each year, starting in 2012 alongside Patrick Dempsey and Sandra Oh. At the 37th People's Choice Awards, Pompeo was nominated for Favorite TV Doctor alongside Dempsey and Oh, and the following year, she was nominated in the Favorite TV Drama Actress category.

In 2007, Tom O'Neil, a show-business awards reporter, remarked that Pompeo was overdue an Primetime Emmy Award nomination for her role on Grey's Anatomy. Readers of O'Neil's website, The Envelope, included Pompeo in their 2009 nominations for Best Drama Actress in the site's Gold Derby TV Awards. In 2008, Entertainment Weekly launched the EWwy Awards to honor actors who had not received Emmy nominations, and Pompeo was nominated in the Best Actress in a Drama Series category, placing fourth with 19% of the readers' votes.

== Bibliography ==
- "Grey's Anatomy: Episode Recap Guide". ABC. Archived from the original on August 28, 2013.
