= List of Grey's Anatomy episodes =

Grey's Anatomy is an American medical drama television series that premiered on the American Broadcasting Company (ABC) as a mid-season replacement on March 27, 2005. The series focuses on the fictional lives of surgical interns and residents as they evolve into seasoned doctors while trying to maintain personal lives. The show's premise originated with Shonda Rhimes, who serves as an executive producer, along with Betsy Beers, Mark Gordon, Krista Vernoff, Rob Corn, Mark Wilding, and Allan Heinberg. The series was created to be racially diverse, utilizing a color-blind casting technique. It is primarily filmed in Los Angeles. The show's title is a play on Gray's Anatomy, the classic human anatomy textbook.

Episodes have been broadcast on Thursday nights since Grey's third season. The first two seasons aired after Desperate Housewives in the Sunday 10:00 pm EST time-slot. All episodes are approximately forty-three minutes, excluding commercials, and are broadcast in both high-definition and standard. Episodes are also available for download at the iTunes Store in standard and high definition, and Amazon Prime Video, with new episodes appearing the day after their live airings. ABC Video on demand also releases episodes of the show, typically one to two days after their premieres. Recent episodes are available on ABC's Android/iTunes app or at ABC's official Grey's Anatomy website, and Hulu.

Grey's Anatomy was among the ten highest-rated shows in the United States from the show's first through fourth season. The show's episodes have won a number of awards, including a Golden Globe Award for Best Drama Series, a People's Choice Award for Favourite TV Drama, and multiple NAACP Image Awards for Outstanding Drama Series. Since its premiere, Buena Vista Home Entertainment has distributed all seasons on DVD. There have been several special episodes recapping events from previous episodes, and two series of webisodes.

In 2010, ABC signed a deal allowing Grey's Anatomy episodes to be streamed on Netflix, and in 2024, all episodes became available on Hulu. In April 2018, Grey's Anatomy became the longest-running drama ever for ABC, and the longest-running American primetime medical drama after the network renewed the series for a fifteenth season, surpassing ER (1994–2009). On March 30, 2026, ABC renewed the series for a twenty-third season.

As of November 19, 2026, 472 episodes of Grey's Anatomy have aired.

== Series overview ==
Season	Episodes	Originally released		Rank	Rating
Season	Episodes	First released	Last released	Rank	Rating
1	9	March 27, 2005	May 22, 2005	8	11.6
2	27	September 25, 2005	May 15, 2006	5	12.5
3	25	September 21, 2006	May 17, 2007	7	12.1
4	17	September 27, 2007	May 22, 2008	9	10.4
5	24	September 25, 2008	May 14, 2009	10	9.6
6	24	September 24, 2009	May 20, 2010	11	9.0
7	22	September 23, 2010	May 19, 2011	17	7.5
8	24	September 22, 2011	May 17, 2012	21	7.6
9	24	September 27, 2012	May 16, 2013	18	7.7
10	24	September 26, 2013	May 15, 2014	11	8.5
11	25	September 25, 2014	May 14, 2015	17	7.8
12	24	September 24, 2015	May 19, 2016	11	7.9
13	24	September 22, 2016	May 18, 2017	16	7.3
14	24	September 28, 2017	May 17, 2018	12	7.1
15	25	September 27, 2018	May 16, 2019	20	6.5
16	21	September 26, 2019	April 9, 2020	30	7.0
17	17	November 12, 2020	June 3, 2021	36	7.6
18	20	September 30, 2021	May 26, 2022	34	6.4
19	20	October 6, 2022	May 18, 2023	42	5.2
20	10	March 14, 2024	May 30, 2024	42	5.1
21	18	September 26, 2024	May 15, 2025	79	6.9
22	18	October 9, 2025	May 7, 2026	TBA	TBA
23	13	October 15, 2026	TBA	TBA	TBA

== Episodes ==
=== Season 1 (2005) ===
No. overall	No. in season	Title	Directed by	Written by	Original release date	Prod. code	U.S. viewers (millions)
1	1	"A Hard Day's Night"	Peter Horton	Shonda Rhimes	March 27, 2005	101	16.25
2	2	"The First Cut Is the Deepest"	Peter Horton	Shonda Rhimes	April 3, 2005	102	17.71
3	3	"Winning a Battle, Losing the War"	Tony Goldwyn	Shonda Rhimes	April 10, 2005	103	17.99
4	4	"No Man's Land"	Adam Davidson	James D. Parriott	April 17, 2005	104	19.18
5	5	"Shake Your Groove Thing"	John David Coles	Ann Hamilton	April 24, 2005	105	17.90
6	6	"If Tomorrow Never Comes"	Scott Brazil	Krista Vernoff	May 1, 2005	106	17.88
7	7	"The Self-Destruct Button"	Darnell Martin	Kip Koenig	May 8, 2005	107	18.87
8	8	"Save Me"	Sarah Pia Anderson	Mimi Schmir	May 15, 2005	108	18.33
9	9	"Who's Zoomin' Who?"	Wendey Stanzler	Gabrielle Stanton & Harry Werksman, Jr.	May 22, 2005	109	22.22

=== Season 2 (2005–06) ===
- Kate Walsh (Dr. Addison Montgomery) joins the cast after guest starring in the Season 1 finale, "Who's Zoomin' Who?".

No. overall	No. in season	Title	Directed by	Written by	Original release date	Prod. code	U.S. viewers (millions)
10	1	"Raindrops Keep Falling on My Head"	Peter Horton	Stacy McKee	September 25, 2005	110	18.98
11	2	"Enough Is Enough" "Enough Is Enough (No More Tears)"	Peter Horton	James D. Parriott	October 2, 2005	201	17.57
12	3	"Make Me Lose Control"	Adam Davidson	Krista Vernoff	October 9, 2005	111	18.12
13	4	"Deny, Deny, Deny"	Wendey Stanzler	Zoanne Clack	October 16, 2005	112	18.28
14	5	"Bring the Pain"	Mark Tinker	Shonda Rhimes	October 23, 2005	113	18.00
15	6	"Into You Like a Train"	Jeff Melman	Krista Vernoff	October 30, 2005	202	16.67
16	7	"Something to Talk About"	Adam Davidson	Stacy McKee	November 6, 2005	203	18.13
17	8	"Let It Be"	Lesli Linka Glatter	Mimi Schmir	November 13, 2005	204	19.74
18	9	"Thanks for the Memories"	Michael Dinner	Shonda Rhimes	November 20, 2005	205	20.33
19	10	"Much too Much"	Wendey Stanzler	Gabrielle Stanton & Harry Werksman, Jr.	November 27, 2005	206	19.59
20	11	"Owner of a Lonely Heart"	Daniel Minahan	Mark Wilding	December 4, 2005	207	20.59
21	12	"Grandma Got Run Over by a Reindeer"	Peter Horton	Krista Vernoff	December 11, 2005	208	15.70
22	13	"Begin the Begin"	Jessica Yu	Kip Koenig	January 15, 2006	209	18.97
23	14	"Tell Me Sweet Little Lies"	Adam Davidson	Tony Phelan & Joan Rater	January 22, 2006	210	21.04
24	15	"Break on Through"	David Paymer	Zoanne Clack	January 29, 2006	211	18.44
25	16	"It's the End of the World"	Peter Horton	Shonda Rhimes	February 5, 2006	212	37.88
26	17	"As We Know It"	Peter Horton	Shonda Rhimes	February 12, 2006	213	25.42
27	18	"Yesterday"	Rob Corn	Story by : Mimi Schmir; Teleplay by : Krista Vernoff	February 19, 2006	214	24.36
28	19	"What Have I Done to Deserve This?"	Wendey Stanzler	Stacy McKee	February 26, 2006	215	24.76
29	20	"Band-Aid Covers the Bullet Hole"	Julie Anne Robinson	Gabrielle Stanton & Harry Werksman, Jr.	March 12, 2006	216	22.51
30	21	"Superstition"	Tricia Brock	James D. Parriott	March 19, 2006	217	21.13
31	22	"The Name of the Game"	Seith Mann	Blythe Robe	April 2, 2006	218	22.35
32	23	"Blues for Sister Someone"	Jeff Melman	Elizabeth Klaviter	April 30, 2006	219	20.76
33	24	"Damage Case"	Tony Goldwyn	Mimi Schmir	May 7, 2006	220	21.99
34	25	"17 Seconds"	Daniel Minahan	Mark Wilding	May 14, 2006	221	22.60
35	26	"Deterioration of the Fight or Flight Response"	Rob Corn	Tony Phelan & Joan Rater	May 15, 2006	222	22.50
36	27	"Losing My Religion"	Mark Tinker	Shonda Rhimes	May 15, 2006	223	22.50

=== Season 3 (2006–07) ===
- Sara Ramirez (Dr. Callie Torres) & Eric Dane (Dr. Mark Sloan) joined the main cast.
- Isaiah Washington (Dr. Preston Burke) and Kate Walsh (Dr. Addison Montgomery) departed the series after the season finale, "Didn't We Almost Have It All? ". Walsh would later star in the spin-off series Private Practice and return for guest appearances in subsequent seasons, while Washington only returned to guest star in the season 10 episode, "We Are Never Ever Getting Back Together".

No. overall	No. in season	Title	Directed by	Written by	Original release date	Prod. code	U.S. viewers (millions)
37	1	"Time Has Come Today"	Daniel Minahan	Shonda Rhimes	September 21, 2006	301	25.41
38	2	"I Am a Tree"	Jeff Melman	Krista Vernoff	September 28, 2006	302	23.48
39	3	"Sometimes a Fantasy"	Adam Arkin	Debora Cahn	October 5, 2006	303	22.80
40	4	"What I Am"	Dan Lerner	Allan Heinberg	October 12, 2006	304	22.88
41	5	"Oh, the Guilt"	Jeff Melman	Zoanne Clack & Tony Phelan & Joan Rater	October 19, 2006	305	22.05
42	6	"Let the Angels Commit"	Jessica Yu	Stacy McKee	November 2, 2006	306	21.03
43	7	"Where the Boys Are"	Daniel Minahan	Mark Wilding	November 9, 2006	307	20.65
44	8	"Staring at the Sun"	Jeff Melman	Gabrielle Stanton & Harry Werksman, Jr.	November 16, 2006	308	20.92
45	9	"From a Whisper to a Scream"	Julie Anne Robinson	Kip Koenig	November 23, 2006	309	18.51
46	10	"Don't Stand So Close to Me"	Seith Mann	Carolina Paiz	November 30, 2006	310	24.01
47	11	"Six Days"	Greg Yaitanes	Krista Vernoff	January 11, 2007	311	23.03
48	12	"Six Days"	Greg Yaitanes	Krista Vernoff	January 18, 2007	312	21.94
49	13	"Great Expectations"	Michael Grossman	Eric Buchman	January 25, 2007	313	21.50
50	14	"Wishin' and Hopin'"	Julie Anne Robinson	Tony Phelan & Joan Rater	February 1, 2007	314	24.18
51	15	"Walk on Water"	Rob Corn	Shonda Rhimes	February 8, 2007	315	25.20
52	16	"Drowning on Dry Land"	Rob Corn	Shonda Rhimes	February 15, 2007	316	25.76
53	17	"Some Kind of Miracle"	Adam Arkin	Shonda Rhimes & Marti Noxon	February 22, 2007	317	27.39
54	18	"Scars and Souvenirs"	James Frawley	Debora Cahn	March 15, 2007	318	22.68
55	19	"My Favorite Mistake"	Tamra Davis	Chris Van Dusen	March 22, 2007	319	22.30
56	20	"Time After Time"	Christopher Misiano	Stacy McKee	April 19, 2007	320	21.13
57	21	"Desire"	Tom Verica	Mark Wilding	April 26, 2007	321	20.08
58	22	"The Other Side of This Life"	Michael Grossman	Shonda Rhimes	May 3, 2007	322	21.23
59	23	"The Other Side of This Life"	Michael Grossman	Shonda Rhimes	May 3, 2007	323	21.23
60	24	"Testing 1-2-3"	Christopher Misiano	Allan Heinberg	May 10, 2007	324	19.58
61	25	"Didn't We Almost Have It All?"	Rob Corn	Tony Phelan & Joan Rater	May 17, 2007	325	22.57

=== Season 4 (2007–08) ===
- Chyler Leigh (Dr. Lexie Grey) joined the main cast after previously guest starring on the final 2 episodes of Season 3.
- Touchstone Television was replaced by ABC Studios after the second episode, "Love/Addiction".
- After guest starring in several episodes from Seasons 2 & 3, Brooke Smith (Dr. Erica Hahn) was promoted to the main cast starting from episode 5 "Haunt You Every Day".

No. overall	No. in season	Title	Directed by	Written by	Original release date	Prod. code	U.S. viewers (millions)
62	1	"A Change Is Gonna Come"	Rob Corn	Shonda Rhimes	September 27, 2007	401	20.93
63	2	"Love/Addiction"	James Frawley	Debora Cahn	October 4, 2007	402	18.51
64	3	"Let the Truth Sting"	Daniel Minahan	Mark Wilding	October 11, 2007	403	19.04
65	4	"The Heart of the Matter"	Randall Zisk	Allan Heinberg	October 18, 2007	404	18.04
66	5	"Haunt You Every Day"	Bethany Rooney	Krista Vernoff	October 25, 2007	405	18.18
67	6	"Kung Fu Fighting"	Tom Verica	Stacy McKee	November 1, 2007	406	19.31
68	7	"Physical Attraction, Chemical Reaction"	Jeff Melman	Tony Phelan & Joan Rater	November 8, 2007	407	19.50
69	8	"Forever Young"	Rob Corn	Mark Wilding	November 15, 2007	408	19.61
70	9	"Crash Into Me"	Michael Grossman	Shonda Rhimes & Krista Vernoff	November 22, 2007	409	14.11
71	10	"Crash Into Me"	Jessica Yu	Shonda Rhimes & Krista Vernoff	December 6, 2007	410	17.78
72	11	"Lay Your Hands on Me"	John Terlesky	Allan Heinberg	January 10, 2008	411	17.68
73	12	"Where the Wild Things Are"	Rob Corn	Zoanne Clack	April 24, 2008	412	16.37
74	13	"Piece of My Heart"	Mark Tinker	Stacy McKee	May 1, 2008	413	15.31
75	14	"The Becoming"	Julie Anne Robinson	Tony Phelan & Joan Rater	May 8, 2008	414	16.03
76	15	"Losing My Mind"	James Frawley	Debora Cahn	May 15, 2008	415	15.55
77	16	"Freedom"	Rob Corn	Shonda Rhimes	May 22, 2008	416	18.09
78	17	"Freedom"	Rob Corn	Shonda Rhimes	May 22, 2008	417	18.09

=== Season 5 (2008–09) ===
- Kevin McKidd (Dr. Owen Hunt) and Jessica Capshaw (Dr. Arizona Robbins) joined the cast.
- Brooke Smith (Dr. Erica Hahn) departed the series after the seventh episode, "Rise Up".
- T.R. Knight (Dr. George O'Malley) departed the series after the season finale, "Now or Never". His character was mentioned and appeared through archival footage in subsequent seasons, while Knight eventually returned to guest star in the Season 17 episode, "You'll Never Walk Alone".
- The series reached 100 episodes with the season's 22nd episode, "What a Difference a Day Makes"

No. overall	No. in season	Title	Directed by	Written by	Original release date	Prod. code	U.S. viewers (millions)
79	1	"Dream a Little Dream of Me"	Rob Corn	Shonda Rhimes	September 25, 2008	501	18.47
80	2	"Dream a Little Dream of Me"	Michael Pressman	Shonda Rhimes	September 25, 2008	502	18.47
81	3	"Here Comes the Flood"	Michael Pressman	Krista Vernoff	October 9, 2008	503	14.80
82	4	"Brave New World"	Eric Stoltz	Debora Cahn	October 16, 2008	504	14.80
83	5	"There's No 'I' in Team"	Randy Zisk	Jenna Bans	October 23, 2008	505	14.45
84	6	"Life During Wartime"	James Frawley	Mark Wilding	October 30, 2008	506	15.32
85	7	"Rise Up"	Joanna Kerns	William Harper	November 6, 2008	507	15.74
86	8	"These Ties That Bind"	Eric Stoltz	Stacy McKee	November 13, 2008	508	14.90
87	9	"In the Midnight Hour"	Tom Verica	Tony Phelan & Joan Rater	November 20, 2008	509	15.91
88	10	"All By Myself"	Arlene Sanford	Peter Nowalk	December 4, 2008	510	15.28
89	11	"Wish You Were Here"	Rob Corn	Debora Cahn	January 8, 2009	511	13.87
90	12	"Sympathy for the Devil"	Jeannot Szwarc	Jenna Bans	January 15, 2009	512	13.10
91	13	"Stairway to Heaven"	Allison Liddi-Brown	Mark Wilding	January 22, 2009	513	14.43
92	14	"Beat Your Heart Out"	Julie Anne Robinson	William Harper	February 5, 2009	514	15.27
93	15	"Before and After"	Dan Attias	Tony Phelan & Joan Rater	February 12, 2009	515	15.16
94	16	"An Honest Mistake"	Randy Zisk	Peter Nowalk	February 19, 2009	516	15.57
95	17	"I Will Follow You Into the Dark"	James Frawley	Jenna Bans	March 12, 2009	517	13.64
96	18	"Stand By Me"	Jessica Yu	Zoanne Clack	March 19, 2009	518	14.61
97	19	"Elevator Love Letter"	Edward Ornelas	Stacy McKee	March 26, 2009	519	16.10
98	20	"Sweet Surrender"	Tony Phelan	Sonay Washington	April 23, 2009	520	13.51
99	21	"No Good at Saying Sorry (One More Chance)"	Tom Verica	Krista Vernoff	April 30, 2009	521	14.12
100	22	"What a Difference a Day Makes"	Rob Corn	Shonda Rhimes	May 7, 2009	522	15.55
101	23	"Here's to Future Days"	Bill D'Elia	Allan Heinberg	May 14, 2009	523	16.53
102	24	"Now or Never"	Rob Corn	Debora Cahn	May 14, 2009	524	16.53

=== Season 6 (2009–10) ===
- Katherine Heigl (Dr. Izzie Stevens) departed the series after the twelfth episode, "I Like You So Much Better When You're Naked".
- Kim Raver (Dr. Teddy Altman) joined the main cast starting from episode 19 "Suicide is Painless".

No. overall	No. in season	Title	Directed by	Written by	Original release date	Prod. code	U.S. viewers (millions)
103	1	"Good Mourning"	Edward Ornelas	Krista Vernoff	September 24, 2009	601	17.03
104	2	"Goodbye"	Bill D'Elia	Krista Vernoff	September 24, 2009	602	17.03
105	3	"I Always Feel Like Somebody's Watchin' Me"	Michael Pressman	Tony Phelan & Joan Rater	October 1, 2009	603	15.69
106	4	"Tainted Obligation"	Tom Verica	Jenna Bans	October 8, 2009	604	14.13
107	5	"Invasion"	Tony Phelan	Mark Wilding	October 15, 2009	605	13.79
108	6	"I Saw What I Saw"	Allison Liddi-Brown	William Harper	October 22, 2009	606	15.06
109	7	"Give Peace a Chance"	Chandra Wilson	Peter Nowalk	October 29, 2009	607	13.74
110	8	"Invest in Love"	Jessica Yu	Stacy McKee	November 5, 2009	608	13.95
111	9	"New History"	Rob Corn	Allan Heinberg	November 12, 2009	609	14.87
112	10	"Holidaze"	Robert Berlinger	Krista Vernoff	November 19, 2009	610	14.07
113	11	"Blink"	Randy Zisk	Debora Cahn	January 14, 2010	611	12.78
114	12	"I Like You So Much Better When You're Naked"	Donna Deitch	Tony Phelan & Joan Rater	January 21, 2010	612	12.70
115	13	"State of Love and Trust"	Jeannot Szwarc	Stacy McKee	February 4, 2010	613	12.55
116	14	"Valentine's Day Massacre"	Stephen Cragg	William Harper	February 11, 2010	614	12.74
117	15	"The Time Warp"	Rob Corn	Zoanne Clack	February 18, 2010	615	10.27
118	16	"Perfect Little Accident"	Bill D'Elia	Peter Nowalk	March 4, 2010	616	11.83
119	17	"Push"	Chandra Wilson	Debora Cahn	March 11, 2010	617	10.94
120	18	"Suicide is Painless"	Jeannot Szwarc	Tony Phelan & Joan Rater	March 25, 2010	618	11.57
121	19	"Sympathy for the Parents"	Debbie Allen	Allan Heinberg	April 1, 2010	619	9.87
122	20	"Hook, Line and Sinner"	Tony Phelan	Meg Marinis	April 29, 2010	620	10.47
123	21	"How Insensitive"	Tom Verica	William Harper	May 6, 2010	621	11.03
124	22	"Shiny Happy People"	Edward Ornelas	Zoanne Clack & Peter Nowalk	May 13, 2010	622	11.05
125	23	"Sanctuary"	Stephen Cragg	Shonda Rhimes	May 20, 2010	623	15.24
126	24	"Death And All His Friends"	Rob Corn	Shonda Rhimes	May 20, 2010	624	15.24

=== Season 7 (2010–11) ===
- Jesse Williams (Dr. Jackson Avery) and Sarah Drew (Dr. April Kepner) joined the main cast.

No. overall	No. in season	Title	Directed by	Written by	Original release date	Prod. code	U.S. viewers (millions)
127	1	"With You I'm Born Again"	Rob Corn	Krista Vernoff	September 23, 2010	701	14.32
128	2	"Shock to the System"	Tom Verica	William Harper	September 30, 2010	702	12.53
129	3	"Superfreak"	Michael Pressman	Mark Wilding	October 7, 2010	703	12.75
130	4	"Can't Fight Biology"	Edward Ornelas	Peter Nowalk	October 14, 2010	704	12.11
131	5	"Almost Grown"	Chandra Wilson	Brian Tanen	October 21, 2010	705	10.97
132	6	"These Arms of Mine"	Stephen Cragg	Stacy McKee	October 28, 2010	706	10.79
133	7	"That's Me Trying"	Tony Phelan	Austin Guzman	November 4, 2010	707	11.92
134	8	"Something's Gotta Give"	Jeannot Szwarc	William Harper	November 11, 2010	708	11.13
135	9	"Slow Night, So Long"	Rob Bailey	Zoanne Clack	November 18, 2010	709	11.46
136	10	"Adrift and at Peace"	Allison Liddi-Brown	Tony Phelan & Joan Rater	December 2, 2010	710	11.02
137	11	"Disarm"	Debbie Allen	Krista Vernoff	January 6, 2011	711	11.64
138	12	"Start Me Up"	Mark Jackson	Natalie Krinsky	January 13, 2011	712	12.15
139	13	"Don't Deceive Me (Please Don't Go)"	Kevin McKidd	Mark Wilding	February 3, 2011	713	11.18
140	14	"P.Y.T. (Pretty Young Thing)"	Steve Robin	Austin Guzman	February 10, 2011	714	10.47
141	15	"Golden Hour"	Rob Corn	Stacy McKee	February 17, 2011	715	10.24
142	16	"Not Responsible"	Debbie Allen	Debora Cahn	February 24, 2011	716	9.13
143	17	"This Is How We Do It"	Edward Ornelas	Peter Nowalk	March 24, 2011	717	10.28
144	18	"Song Beneath the Song"	Tony Phelan	Shonda Rhimes	March 31, 2011	718	13.09
145	19	"It's a Long Way Back"	Steve Robin	William Harper	April 28, 2011	719	10.67
146	20	"White Wedding"	Chandra Wilson	Stacy McKee	May 5, 2011	720	10.11
147	21	"I Will Survive"	Tom Verica	Zoanne Clack	May 12, 2011	721	9.63
148	22	"Unaccompanied Minor"	Rob Corn	Debora Cahn	May 19, 2011	722	9.89

=== Season 8 (2011–12) ===
- Chyler Leigh (Dr. Lexie Grey) and Kim Raver (Dr. Teddy Altman) both departed the series after the season finale, "Flight". Raver would eventually re-join the main cast in Season 15, while Leigh only returned to guest star in the Season 17 episode, "Breathe".

No. overall	No. in season	Title	Directed by	Written by	Original release date	Prod. code	U.S. viewers (millions)
149	1	"Free Falling"	Rob Corn	Tony Phelan & Joan Rater	September 22, 2011	801	10.38
150	2	"She's Gone"	Tony Phelan	Debora Cahn	September 22, 2011	802	10.38
151	3	"Take the Lead"	Chandra Wilson	William Harper	September 29, 2011	803	10.20
152	4	"What Is It About Men"	Tom Verica	Stacy McKee	October 6, 2011	804	8.70
153	5	"Loss, Love and Legacy"	Stephen Cragg	Denise Hahn	October 13, 2011	805	9.97
154	6	"Poker Face"	Kevin McKidd	Peter Nowalk	October 20, 2011	806	9.54
155	7	"Put Me In, Coach"	Debbie Allen	Jeannine Renshaw	October 27, 2011	807	9.93
156	8	"Heart-Shaped Box"	Jessica Yu	Austin Guzman	November 3, 2011	808	9.52
157	9	"Dark Was the Night"	Allison Liddi-Brown	Debora Cahn	November 10, 2011	809	11.29
158	10	"Suddenly"	Ron Underwood	Stacy McKee	January 5, 2012	810	12.12
159	11	"This Magic Moment"	Steve Robin	Zoanne Clack	January 12, 2012	811	10.71
160	12	"Hope for the Hopeless"	Mark Jackson	Peter Nowalk	January 19, 2012	812	9.42
161	13	"If/Then"	Jeannot Szwarc	William Harper	February 2, 2012	813	9.71
162	14	"All You Need Is Love"	Rob Corn	Jeannine Renshaw	February 9, 2012	814	10.27
163	15	"Have You Seen Me Lately?"	Tony Phelan	Austin Guzman	February 16, 2012	815	8.31
164	16	"If Only You Were Lonely"	Susan Vaill	Matt Byrne	February 23, 2012	816	9.06
165	17	"One Step Too Far"	Edward Ornelas	William Harper	March 15, 2012	817	9.62
166	18	"The Lion Sleeps Tonight"	Mark Jackson	Stacy McKee	April 5, 2012	818	8.19
167	19	"Support System"	Allison Liddi-Brown	Heather Mitchell	April 12, 2012	819	8.85
168	20	"The Girl With No Name"	Ron Underwood	Peter Nowalk	April 19, 2012	820	9.82
169	21	"Moment of Truth"	Chandra Wilson	Zakiyyah Alexander	April 26, 2012	821	9.45
170	22	"Let the Bad Times Roll"	Kevin McKidd	Matt Byrne	May 3, 2012	822	9.24
171	23	"Migration"	Stephen Cragg	Mark Wilding & Jenna Bans	May 10, 2012	823	9.82
172	24	"Flight"	Rob Corn	Shonda Rhimes	May 17, 2012	824	11.44

=== Season 9 (2012–13) ===
- Camilla Luddington (Dr. Jo Wilson) and Jerrika Hinton (Dr. Stephanie Edwards) joined the cast.
- Eric Dane (Dr. Mark Sloan) departed the series after the second episode, "Remember the Time", Dane briefly return in the Season 17 episode, "Breathe".

No. overall	No. in season	Title	Directed by	Written by	Original release date	Prod. code	U.S. viewers (millions)
173	1	"Going, Going, Gone"	Rob Corn	Stacy McKee	September 27, 2012	901	11.73
174	2	"Remember the Time"	Tony Phelan	William Harper	October 4, 2012	902	10.84
175	3	"Love the One You're With"	Debbie Allen	Zoanne Clack	October 18, 2012	903	9.69
176	4	"I Saw Her Standing There"	Kevin McKidd	Austin Guzman	October 25, 2012	904	8.76
177	5	"Beautiful Doom"	Stephen Cragg	Jeannine Renshaw	November 8, 2012	905	9.26
178	6	"Second Opinion"	Chandra Wilson	William Harper	November 15, 2012	906	8.84
179	7	"I Was Made for Lovin' You"	Laura Innes	Peter Nowalk	November 29, 2012	907	8.95
180	8	"Love Turns You Upside Down"	Mark Jackson	Stacy McKee	December 6, 2012	908	9.10
181	9	"Run, Baby, Run"	Rob Corn	Debora Cahn	December 13, 2012	909	8.17
182	10	"Things We Said Today"	Ron Underwood	Austin Guzman	January 10, 2013	910	9.34
183	11	"The End Is the Beginning Is the End"	Cherie Nowlan	Joan Rater	January 17, 2013	911	8.80
184	12	"Walking on a Dream"	Rob Hardy	Tia Napolitano	January 24, 2013	912	9.01
185	13	"Bad Blood"	Steve Robin	Jeannine Renshaw	January 31, 2013	913	8.93
186	14	"The Face of Change"	Rob Greenlea	Stacy McKee	February 7, 2013	914	8.91
187	15	"Hard Bargain"	Tony Phelan	William Harper	February 14, 2013	915	8.57
188	16	"This Is Why We Fight"	Jeannot Szwarc	Austin Guzman	February 21, 2013	916	8.75
189	17	"Transplant Wasteland"	Chandra Wilson	Zoanne Clack	March 14, 2013	917	8.20
190	18	"Idle Hands"	David Greenspan	Gabriel Llanas	March 21, 2013	918	9.39
191	19	"Can't Fight This Feeling"	Mark Jackson	Meg Marinis	March 28, 2013	919	9.02
192	20	"She's Killing Me"	Nicole Rubio	Debora Cahn	April 4, 2013	920	8.58
193	21	"Sleeping Monster"	Bobby Roth	Bronwyn Garrity	April 25, 2013	921	8.24
194	22	"Do You Believe in Magic?"	Kevin McKidd	Dan Bucatinsky	May 2, 2013	922	8.87
195	23	"Readiness is All"	Tony Phelan	William Harper	May 9, 2013	923	8.97
196	24	"Perfect Storm"	Rob Corn	Stacy McKee	May 16, 2013	924	8.99

=== Season 10 (2013–14) ===
- Sandra Oh (Dr. Cristina Yang) departed the series after the season finale, "Fear (of the Unknown)".
- The series reached 200 episodes with the season's fourth episode, "Puttin' On The Ritz"

No. overall	No. in season	Title	Directed by	Written by	Original release date	Prod. code	U.S. viewers (millions)
197	1	"Seal Our Fate"	Rob Corn	Joan Rater	September 26, 2013	1001	9.27
198	2	"I Want You with Me"	Chandra Wilson	Debora Cahn	September 26, 2013	1002	9.27
199	3	"Everybody's Crying Mercy"	Tony Phelan	Tia Napolitano	October 3, 2013	1003	9.60
200	4	"Puttin' On the Ritz"	Rob Corn	Austin Guzman	October 10, 2013	1004	8.79
201	5	"I Bet It Stung"	Mark Jackson	Jeannine Renshaw	October 17, 2013	1005	8.78
202	6	"Map of You"	David Greenspan	William Harper	October 24, 2013	1006	8.73
203	7	"Thriller"	Cherie Nowlan	Gabriel Llanas	October 31, 2013	1007	8.94
204	8	"Two Against One"	Kevin McKidd	Meg Marinis	November 7, 2013	1008	8.68
205	9	"Sorry Seems to Be the Hardest Word"	Jeannot Szwarc	Stacy McKee	November 14, 2013	1009	8.56
206	10	"Somebody That I Used to Know"	Debbie Allen	Debora Cahn	November 21, 2013	1010	8.61
207	11	"Man on the Moon"	Bobby Roth	Elizabeth J. B. Klaviter	December 5, 2013	1011	7.02
208	12	"Get Up, Stand Up"	Tony Phelan	William Harper	December 12, 2013	1012	8.36
209	13	"Take It Back"	Rob Corn	Austin Guzman	February 27, 2014	1013	9.42
210	14	"You've Got to Hide Your Love Away"	Ron Underwood	Tia Napolitano	March 6, 2014	1014	8.21
211	15	"Throwing It All Away"	Chris Hayden	William Harper	March 13, 2014	1015	7.36
212	16	"We Gotta Get Out of This Place"	Susan Vaill	Jeannine Renshaw	March 20, 2014	1016	8.09
213	17	"Do You Know?"	Chandra Wilson	Stacy McKee	March 27, 2014	1017	8.42
214	18	"You Be Illin'"	Nicole Rubio	Zoanne Clack	April 3, 2014	1018	8.28
215	19	"I'm Winning"	Kevin McKidd	Joan Rater	April 10, 2014	1019	8.18
216	20	"Go It Alone"	Mark Jackson	Lauren Barnett	April 17, 2014	1020	8.45
217	21	"Change of Heart"	Rob Greenlea	Meg Marinis	April 24, 2014	1021	7.99
218	22	"We Are Never Ever Getting Back Together"	Rob Corn	Joan Rater	May 1, 2014	1022	8.81
219	23	"Everything I Try to Do, Nothing Seems to Turn Out Right"	Bill D'Elia	Austin Guzman	May 8, 2014	1023	7.95
220	24	"Fear (Of the Unknown)"	Tony Phelan	William Harper	May 15, 2014	1024	8.92

=== Season 11 (2014–15) ===
- Patrick Dempsey (Dr. Derek Shepherd) departed the series after the season finale, "You're My Home", Dempsey eventually returned to guest star several episodes in Season 17.
- Caterina Scorsone (Dr. Amelia Shepherd), Kelly McCreary (Dr. Maggie Pierce) and Giacomo Gianniotti (Dr. Andrew DeLuca) joined the cast, Scorsone had previously portrayed the character on the spin-off Private Practice.

No. overall	No. in season	Title	Directed by	Written by	Original release date	Prod. code	U.S. viewers (millions)
221	1	"I Must Have Lost it on the Wind"	Kevin McKidd	Stacy McKee	September 25, 2014	1101	9.81
222	2	"Puzzle with a Piece Missing"	Rob Corn	William Harper	October 2, 2014	1102	9.15
223	3	"Got to Be Real"	Rob Corn	Zoanne Clack	October 9, 2014	1103	8.48
224	4	"Only Mama Knows"	Nicole Rubio	Mark Driscoll	October 16, 2014	1104	8.43
225	5	"Bend & Break"	Jesse Bochco	Meg Marinis	October 23, 2014	1105	8.62
226	6	"Don't Let's Start"	Rob Greenlea	Austin Guzman	November 6, 2014	1106	8.08
227	7	"Could We Start Again, Please?"	Bobby Roth	Andy Reaser	November 13, 2014	1107	8.36
228	8	"Risk"	Rob Corn	William Harper	November 20, 2014	1108	8.33
229	9	"Where Do We Go From Here"	Debbie Allen	Meg Marinis	January 29, 2015	1109	8.71
230	10	"The Bed's Too Big Without You"	Chandra Wilson	Tia Napolitano	February 5, 2015	1110	7.98
231	11	"All I Could Do Was Cry"	Ron Underwood	Elizabeth J.B. Klaviter	February 12, 2015	1111	7.81
232	12	"The Great Pretender"	Jeannot Szwarc	Mark Driscoll	February 19, 2015	1112	8.13
233	13	"Staring at the End"	Mark Jackson	Stacy McKee	February 26, 2015	1113	7.56
234	14	"The Distance"	Eric Laneuville	Austin Guzman	March 5, 2015	1114	8.09
235	15	"I Feel the Earth Move"	Thomas J. Wright	Jen Klein	March 12, 2015	1115	7.40
236	16	"Don't Dream It's Over"	Susan Vaill	Andy Reaser	March 19, 2015	1116	7.73
237	17	"With or Without You"	Chandra Wilson	Elisabeth R. Finch	March 26, 2015	1117	8.18
238	18	"When I Grow Up"	Zetna Fuentes	Tia Napolitano	April 2, 2015	1118	6.64
239	19	"Crazy Love"	Paul McCrane	Elizabeth J.B. Klaviter	April 9, 2015	1119	7.42
240	20	"One Flight Down"	David Greenspan	Austin Guzman	April 16, 2015	1120	7.60
241	21	"How to Save a Life"	Rob Hardy	Shonda Rhimes	April 23, 2015	1121	9.55
242	22	"She's Leaving Home"	Chris Hayden	Stacy McKee	April 30, 2015	1122	8.74
243	23	"She's Leaving Home"	Chris Hayden	Stacy McKee	April 30, 2015	1123	8.74
244	24	"Time Stops"	Kevin McKidd	Meg Marinis	May 7, 2015	1124	7.74
245	25	"You're My Home"	Rob Corn	William Harper	May 14, 2015	1125	8.33

=== Season 12 (2015–16) ===
- Martin Henderson (Dr. Nathan Riggs) joined the cast, while Jason George (Dr. Ben Warren) was upgraded to the main cast after recurring appearances in the previous seasons.
- Sara Ramirez (Dr. Callie Torres) departed the series after the season finale, "Family Affair".

No. overall	No. in season	Title	Directed by	Written by	Original release date	Prod. code	U.S. viewers (millions)
246	1	"Sledgehammer"	Kevin McKidd	Stacy McKee	September 24, 2015	1201	9.55
247	2	"Walking Tall"	Debbie Allen	Meg Marinis	October 1, 2015	1202	8.58
248	3	"I Choose You"	Rob Corn	William Harper	October 8, 2015	1203	8.12
249	4	"Old Time Rock and Roll"	Nicole Rubio	Austin Guzman	October 15, 2015	1204	8.25
250	5	"Guess Who's Coming to Dinner"	Debbie Allen	Mark Driscoll	October 22, 2015	1205	8.96
251	6	"The Me Nobody Knows"	Jeannot Szwarc	Karin Gist	November 5, 2015	1206	8.50
252	7	"Something Against You"	Geary McLeod	Andy Reaser	November 12, 2015	1207	8.02
253	8	"Things We Lost in the Fire"	Rob Corn	Tia Napolitano	November 19, 2015	1208	8.50
254	9	"The Sound of Silence"	Denzel Washington	Stacy McKee	February 11, 2016	1209	8.28
255	10	"All I Want Is You"	Kevin Sullivan	Elisabeth R. Finch	February 18, 2016	1210	7.82
256	11	"Unbreak My Heart"	Rob Corn	Elizabeth J.B. Klaviter	February 25, 2016	1211	7.23
257	12	"My Next Life"	Chandra Wilson	William Harper	March 3, 2016	1212	7.67
258	13	"All Eyez on Me"	Charlotte Brandström	Austin Guzman	March 10, 2016	1213	7.53
259	14	"Odd Man Out"	Kevin McKidd	Meg Marinis	March 17, 2016	1214	7.83
260	15	"I Am Not Waiting Anymore"	Nicole Rubio	Mark Driscoll	March 24, 2016	1215	7.91
261	16	"When It Hurts So Bad"	Eric Laneuville	Andy Reaser	March 31, 2016	1216	7.77
262	17	"I Wear the Face"	Chandra Wilson	Karin Gist	April 7, 2016	1217	7.35
263	18	"There's a Fine, Fine Line"	Jeannot Szwarc	Jen Klein	April 14, 2016	1218	7.97
264	19	"It's Alright, Ma (I'm Only Bleeding)"	Chris Hayden	Austin Guzman	April 14, 2016	1219	7.97
265	20	"Trigger Happy"	Zetna Fuentes	Zoanne Clack	April 21, 2016	1220	7.65
266	21	"You're Gonna Need Someone on Your Side"	Debbie Allen	Lauren Barnett	April 28, 2016	1221	7.91
267	22	"Mama Tried"	Kevin McKidd	Tia Napolitano	May 5, 2016	1222	7.66
268	23	"At Last"	Rob Corn	Stacy McKee	May 12, 2016	1223	7.77
269	24	"Family Affair"	Debbie Allen	William Harper	May 19, 2016	1224	8.19

=== Season 13 (2016–17) ===
- Jerrika Hinton (Dr. Stephanie Edwards) departed the series after the season finale, "Ring of Fire".

No. overall	No. in season	Title	Directed by	Written by	Original release date	Prod. code	U.S. viewers (millions)
270	1	"Undo"	Debbie Allen	William Harper	September 22, 2016	1301	8.75
271	2	"Catastrophe and the Cure"	Kevin McKidd	Karin Gist	September 29, 2016	1302	8.41
272	3	"I Ain't No Miracle Worker"	Rob Corn	Andy Reaser	October 6, 2016	1303	8.08
273	4	"Falling Slowly"	Victoria Mahoney	Jen Klein	October 13, 2016	1304	7.80
274	5	"Both Sides Now"	Chandra Wilson	Mark Driscoll	October 20, 2016	1305	8.17
275	6	"Roar"	Nicole Rubio	Elizabeth J.B. Klaviter	October 27, 2016	1306	8.17
276	7	"Why Try to Change Me Now"	Jeannot Szwarc	Austin Guzman	November 3, 2016	1307	7.60
277	8	"The Room Where It Happens"	Debbie Allen	Meg Marinis	November 10, 2016	1308	7.25
278	9	"You Haven't Done Nothin'"	Rob Corn	Karin Gist	November 17, 2016	1309	8.04
279	10	"You Can Look (But You'd Better Not Touch)"	Jann Turner	Tia Napolitano	January 26, 2017	1313	9.59
280	11	"Jukebox Hero"	Kevin Rodney Sullivan	Zoanne Clack	February 2, 2017	1310	8.49
281	12	"None of Your Business"	Geary McLeod	Andy Reaser	February 9, 2017	1311	8.46
282	13	"It Only Gets Much Worse"	Jeannot Szwarc	Lauren Barnett	February 16, 2017	1312	7.68
283	14	"Back Where You Belong"	Oliver Bokelberg	Jen Klein	February 23, 2017	1314	7.71
284	15	"Civil War"	Nicole Rubio	Elizabeth J.B. Klaviter	March 9, 2017	1315	7.31
285	16	"Who Is He (And What Is He to You)?"	Kevin McKidd	Elisabeth R. Finch	March 16, 2017	1316	7.90
286	17	"'Til I Hear It From You"	Kevin McKidd	Austin Guzman	March 23, 2017	1317	7.80
287	18	"Be Still, My Soul"	Ellen Pompeo	Meg Marinis	March 30, 2017	1318	7.62
288	19	"What's Inside"	Nzingha Stewart	Tia Napolitano	April 6, 2017	1320	7.23
289	20	"In the Air Tonight"	Chandra Wilson	Stacy McKee	April 13, 2017	1319	7.06
290	21	"Don't Stop Me Now"	Louis Venosta	Andy Reaser	April 27, 2017	1321	7.02
291	22	"Leave It Inside"	Zetna Fuentes	Elisabeth R. Finch	May 4, 2017	1322	7.09
292	23	"True Colors"	Kevin McKidd	William Harper	May 11, 2017	1323	7.02
293	24	"Ring of Fire"	Debbie Allen	Stacy McKee	May 18, 2017	1324	7.92

=== Season 14 (2017–18) ===
- Jake Borelli (Dr. Levi Schmitt) joined the cast.
- Martin Henderson (Dr. Nathan Riggs) departed the series after the fifth episode, "Danger Zone".
- Jessica Capshaw (Dr. Arizona Robbins), Sarah Drew (Dr. April Kepner) and Jason George (Dr. Ben Warren) departed the series after the season finale, "All of Me". George would later star on the spin-off series, Station 19, while Drew and Capshaw would eventually returned to the series for several guest star appearances in Seasons 17, 18 and 20, respectively.
- The series reached 300 episodes with the season's seventh episode, "Who Lives, Who Dies, Who Tells Your Story"

No. overall	No. in season	Title	Directed by	Written by	Original release date	Prod. code	U.S. viewers (millions)
294	1	"Break Down the House"	Debbie Allen	Krista Vernoff	September 28, 2017	1401	8.07
295	2	"Get Off on the Pain"	Kevin McKidd	Krista Vernoff	September 28, 2017	1402	8.07
296	3	"Go Big or Go Home"	Chandra Wilson	Meg Marinis	October 5, 2017	1403	8.06
297	4	"Ain't That a Kick in the Head?"	Geary McLeod	Marlana Hope	October 12, 2017	1404	8.08
298	5	"Danger Zone"	Cecilie Mosli	Jalysa Conway	October 26, 2017	1405	7.67
299	6	"Come on Down to My Boat, Baby"	Lisa Leone	Kiley Donovan	November 2, 2017	1406	7.38
300	7	"Who Lives, Who Dies, Who Tells Your Story"	Debbie Allen	Krista Vernoff	November 9, 2017	1407	8.13
301	8	"Out of Nowhere"	Kevin McKidd	William Harper	November 16, 2017	1408	7.52
302	9	"1-800-799-7233" "Four Seasons in One Day"	Bill D'Elia	Andy Reaser	January 18, 2018	1409	8.27
303	10	"Personal Jesus"	Kevin Sullivan	Zoanne Clack	January 25, 2018	1410	8.62
304	11	"(Don't Fear) the Reaper"	Nicole Rubio	Elisabeth R. Finch	February 1, 2018	1412	8.93
305	12	"Harder, Better, Faster, Stronger"	Jeannot Szwarc	Kiley Donovan	February 8, 2018	1411	7.32
306	13	"You Really Got a Hold on Me"	Nzingha Stewart	Stacy McKee	March 1, 2018	1413	7.52
307	14	"Games People Play"	Chandra Wilson	Jason Ganzel & Julie Wong	March 8, 2018	1414	7.07
308	15	"Old Scars, Future Hearts"	Ellen Pompeo	Tameson Duffy	March 15, 2018	1415	7.18
309	16	"Caught Somewhere in Time"	Nicole Rubio	Jalysa Conway	March 22, 2018	1416	7.61
310	17	"One Day Like This"	Kevin McKidd	Elisabeth R. Finch	March 29, 2018	1417	7.15
311	18	"Hold Back the River"	Geary McLeod	Alex Manugian	April 5, 2018	1418	6.84
312	19	"Beautiful Dreamer"	Jeannot Szwarc	Meg Marinis	April 12, 2018	1419	6.97
313	20	"Judgment Day"	Sydney Freeland	Julie Wong	April 19, 2018	1420	6.93
314	21	"Bad Reputation"	Kevin McKidd	Mark Driscoll	April 26, 2018	1421	6.54
315	22	"Fight for Your Mind"	Jesse Williams	Andy Reaser	May 3, 2018	1422	6.66
316	23	"Cold as Ice"	Bill D'Elia	William Harper	May 10, 2018	1423	7.35
317	24	"All of Me"	Debbie Allen	Krista Vernoff	May 17, 2018	1424	7.60

=== Season 15 (2018–19) ===
- Kim Raver (Dr. Teddy Altman) was promoted to the main cast, marking her first series-regular appearance since the Season 8 finale, "Flight".
- Greg Germann (Dr. Tom Koracick) joined the cast.
- The Mark Gordon Company was replaced by Entertainment One after the tenth episode, "Help, I'm Alive".
- The series surpassed ER as the longest-running American primetime medical drama series with the season's fifteenth episode and 332nd episode overall, "We Didn't Start the Fire".

No. overall	No. in season	Title	Directed by	Written by	Original release date	Prod. code	U.S. viewers (millions)
318	1	"With a Wonder and a Wild Desire"	Debbie Allen	Krista Vernoff	September 27, 2018	1501	6.81
319	2	"Broken Together"	Kevin McKidd	Meg Marinis	September 27, 2018	1502	6.81
320	3	"Gut Feeling"	Michael Watkins	Mark Driscoll	October 4, 2018	1503	6.61
321	4	"Momma Knows Best"	Cecilie Mosli	William Harper	October 11, 2018	1504	6.72
322	5	"Everyday Angel"	Chandra Wilson	Julie Wong	October 25, 2018	1505	6.54
323	6	"Flowers Grow Out of My Grave"	Nicole Rubio	Kiley Donovan	November 1, 2018	1506	6.71
324	7	"Anybody Have a Map?"	Krista Vernoff	Elisabeth R. Finch	November 8, 2018	1507	6.60
325	8	"Blowin' in the Wind"	Kevin McKidd	Meg Marinis	November 15, 2018	1508	7.30
326	9	"Shelter from the Storm"	Jann Turner	William Harper	January 17, 2019	1509	7.07
327	10	"Help, I'm Alive"	Daniel Willis	Jalysa Conway & Jason Ganzel	January 24, 2019	1510	6.98
328	11	"The Winner Takes It All"	Allison Liddi-Brown	Elisabeth R. Finch	January 31, 2019	1512	7.27
329	12	"Girlfriend in a Coma"	Debbie Allen	Kiley Donovan	February 7, 2019	1511	6.79
330	13	"I Walk the Line"	Kevin McKidd	Tameson Duffy	February 14, 2019	1513	6.58
331	14	"I Want a New Drug"	Jeannot Szwarc	Zoanne Clack	February 21, 2019	1514	6.89
332	15	"We Didn't Start the Fire"	Chandra Wilson	Andy Reaser	February 28, 2019	1515	6.99
333	16	"Blood and Water"	Pete Chatmon	Kiley Donovan	March 7, 2019	1516	6.55
334	17	"And Dream of Sheep"	Sydney Freeland	William Harper	March 14, 2019	1517	6.57
335	18	"Add It Up"	Michael Watkins	Alex Manugian	March 21, 2019	1518	7.00
336	19	"Silent All These Years"	Debbie Allen	Elisabeth R. Finch	March 28, 2019	1519	7.37
337	20	"The Whole Package"	Geary McLeod	Meg Marinis	April 4, 2019	1520	6.85
338	21	"Good Shepherd"	Bill D'Elia	Julie Wong	April 11, 2019	1522	6.81
339	22	"Head Over High Heels"	Allison Liddi-Brown	Bridgette N. Burgess	April 18, 2019	1521	6.24
340	23	"What I Did for Love"	Jesse Williams	Mark Driscoll	May 2, 2019	1523	6.96
341	24	"Drawn to the Blood"	Kevin McKidd	Andy Reaser	May 9, 2019	1524	6.37
342	25	"Jump into the Fog"	Debbie Allen	Krista Vernoff	May 16, 2019	1525	5.99

=== Season 16 (2019–20) ===
- Justin Chambers (Dr. Alex Karev) departed the series after the sixteenth episode, "Leave a Light On".
- ABC Studios was replaced by ABC Signature after the season finale, "Put on a Happy Face".

No. overall	No. in season	Title	Directed by	Written by	Original release date	Prod. code	U.S. viewers (millions)
343	1	"Nothing Left to Cling To"	Debbie Allen	Krista Vernoff	September 26, 2019	1601	6.51
344	2	"Back in the Saddle"	Kevin McKidd	Meg Marinis	October 3, 2019	1602	6.08
345	3	"Reunited"	Michael Medico	Andy Reaser	October 10, 2019	1603	6.09
346	4	"It's Raining Men"	Michael Watkins	Mark Driscoll	October 17, 2019	1604	5.75
347	5	"Breathe Again"	Chandra Wilson	Elisabeth R. Finch	October 24, 2019	1605	6.10
348	6	"Whistlin' Past the Graveyard"	Pete Chatmon	Julie Wong	October 31, 2019	1606	5.66
349	7	"Papa Don't Preach"	Daniel Willis	Jalysa Conway	November 7, 2019	1607	6.16
350	8	"My Shot"	Debbie Allen	Meg Marinis	November 14, 2019	1608	6.34
351	9	"Let's All Go to the Bar"	Kevin McKidd	Kiley Donovan	November 21, 2019	1609	6.40
352	10	"Help Me Through the Night"	Allison Liddi-Brown	Lynne E. Litt	January 23, 2020	1610	6.66
353	11	"A Hard Pill to Swallow"	Michael Medico	Adrian Wenner	January 30, 2020	1611	5.56
354	12	"The Last Supper"	Nicole Rubio	Jason Ganzel	February 6, 2020	1612	5.47
355	13	"Save the Last Dance for Me"	Jesse Williams	Tameson Duffy	February 13, 2020	1613	5.58
356	14	"A Diagnosis"	Greg Evans	Julie Wong	February 20, 2020	1614	5.99
357	15	"Snowblind"	Linda Klein	Meg Marinis	February 27, 2020	1615	6.00
358	16	"Leave a Light On"	Debbie Allen	Elisabeth R. Finch	March 5, 2020	1616	6.30
359	17	"Life on Mars?"	Michael Watkins	Jase Miles-Perez	March 12, 2020	1617	6.27
360	18	"Give a Little Bit"	Kevin McKidd	Zoanne Clack	March 19, 2020	1618	7.04
361	19	"Love of My Life"	Allison Liddi-Brown	Kiley Donovan & Andy Reaser	March 26, 2020	1619	6.52
362	20	"Sing It Again"	Michael Watkins	Jess Righthand	April 2, 2020	1620	7.18
363	21	"Put on a Happy Face"	Deborah Pratt	Mark Driscoll & Tameson Duffy	April 9, 2020	1621	7.33

=== Season 17 (2020–21) ===
- Giacomo Gianniotti (Dr. Andrew DeLuca) departed the series after episode nine, "In My Life".
- Jesse Williams (Dr. Jackson Avery) and Greg Germann (Dr. Tom Koracick) both departed the series after the season finale, "Someone Saved My Life Tonight". Both actors kept making recurring appearances in subsequent seasons, with Williams returning most frequently.

Grey's Anatomy season 17 episodes
No. overall	No. in season	Title	Directed by	Written by	Original release date	U.S. viewers (millions)
364	1	"All Tomorrow's Parties"	Debbie Allen	Andy Reaser & Lynne E. Litt	November 12, 2020	5.93
365	2	"The Center Won't Hold"	Debbie Allen	Andy Reaser & Jase Miles-Perez	November 12, 2020	5.93
366	3	"My Happy Ending"	Kevin McKidd	Meg Marinis	November 19, 2020	5.96
367	4	"You'll Never Walk Alone"	Allison Liddi-Brown	Julie Wong	December 3, 2020	5.84
368	5	"Fight the Power"	Michael Watkins	Zoanne Clack	December 10, 2020	5.69
369	6	"No Time for Despair"	Pete Chatmon	Felicia Pride	December 17, 2020	5.66
370	7	"Helplessly Hoping"	Nicole Rubio	Elisabeth R. Finch	March 11, 2021	5.11
371	8	"It's All Too Much"	Debbie Allen	Adrian Wenner	March 18, 2021	4.97
372	9	"In My Life"	Kevin McKidd	Tameson Duffy	March 25, 2021	4.99
373	10	"Breathe"	Linda Klein	Mark Driscoll	April 1, 2021	4.55
374	11	"Sorry Doesn't Always Make It Right"	Giacomo Gianniotti	Julie Wong	April 8, 2021	4.83
375	12	"Sign O' the Times"	Michael Medico	Jase Miles-Perez	April 15, 2021	4.98
376	13	"Good as Hell"	Michael Watkins	Zoanne Clack	April 22, 2021	4.81
377	14	"Look Up Child"	Debbie Allen	Elisabeth R. Finch & Felicia Pride	May 6, 2021	4.93
378	15	"Tradition"	Kevin McKidd	Jess Righthand	May 20, 2021	4.58
379	16	"I'm Still Standing"	Michael Watkins	Meg Marinis & Andy Reaser	May 27, 2021	4.33
380	17	"Someone Saved My Life Tonight"	Kevin McKidd	Andy Reaser & Meg Marinis	June 3, 2021	4.76

=== Season 18 (2021–22) ===
- The series reached 400 episodes with the season's twentieth episode and season finale, "You Are the Blood".

No. overall	No. in season	Title	Directed by	Written by	Original release date	U.S. viewers (millions)
381	1	"Here Comes the Sun"	Debbie Allen	Meg Marinis	September 30, 2021	4.77
382	2	"Some Kind of Tomorrow"	Kevin McKidd	Felicia Pride	October 7, 2021	4.04
383	3	"Hotter Than Hell"	Chandra Wilson	Jamie Denbo	October 14, 2021	4.05
384	4	"With a Little Help From My Friends"	Michael Watkins	Jess Righthand	October 21, 2021	3.91
385	5	"Bottle Up and Explode!"	Lindsay Cohen	Kiley Donovan & Beto Skubs	November 11, 2021	4.75
386	6	"Everyday Is a Holiday (With You)"	Tony Phelan	Meg Marinis	November 18, 2021	4.18
387	7	"Today Was a Fairytale"	Debbie Allen	Julie Wong	December 9, 2021	3.65
388	8	"It Came Upon a Midnight Clear"	Michael Watkins	Jase Miles-Perez	December 16, 2021	4.20
389	9	"No Time to Die"	Linda Klein	Krista Vernoff	February 24, 2022	4.65
390	10	"Living in a House Divided"	Allison Liddi-Brown	Jamie Denbo	March 3, 2022	3.95
391	11	"Legacy"	Kevin McKidd	Mark Driscoll	March 10, 2022	3.87
392	12	"The Makings of You"	Debbie Allen	Felicia Pride	March 17, 2022	3.60
393	13	"Put the Squeeze on Me"	Allison Liddi-Brown	Julie Wong	March 24, 2022	4.24
394	14	"Road Trippin'"	Linda Klein	Beto Skubs	March 31, 2022	3.93
395	15	"Put It to the Test"	Kevin McKidd	Zoanne Clack	April 7, 2022	4.21
396	16	"Should I Stay or Should I Go"	Michael Watkins	Jase Miles-Perez & Jess Righthand	May 5, 2022	3.90
397	17	"I'll Cover You"	Debbie Allen	Emily Culver & Kiley Donovan	May 12, 2022	3.60
398	18	"Stronger Than Hate"	Chandra Wilson	Julie Wong	May 19, 2022	3.80
399	19	"Out for Blood"	Kevin McKidd	Meg Marinis	May 26, 2022	4.19
400	20	"You Are the Blood"	Debbie Allen	Krista Vernoff	May 26, 2022	4.19

=== Season 19 (2022–23) ===
- Alexis Floyd (Dr. Simone Griffith), Harry Shum, Jr. (Dr. Benson "Blue" Kwan), Adelaide Kane (Dr. Jules Millin), Midori Francis (Dr. Mika Yasuda), and Niko Terho (Dr. Lucas Adams) all joined the cast.
- Kelly McCreary (Dr. Maggie Pierce) departed the series and Entertainment One was replaced by Lionsgate Television after the season finale, "Happily Ever After?", due to Lionsgate's acquisition of eOne.
- Ellen Pompeo (Dr. Meredith Grey) scaled back her role in the series starting from this season. Pompeo will appear in a limited quantity of episodes per season, while retaining her roles as an executive producer and narrator of the series.

No. overall	No. in season	Title	Directed by	Written by	Original release date	U.S. viewers (millions)
401	1	"Everything Has Changed"	Debbie Allen	Krista Vernoff	October 6, 2022	3.80
402	2	"Wasn't Expecting That"	Pete Chatmon	Meg Marinis	October 13, 2022	3.27
403	3	"Let's Talk About Sex"	Kevin McKidd	Michelle Lirtzman	October 20, 2022	3.58
404	4	"Haunted"	Amyn Kaderali	Jamie Denbo	October 27, 2022	3.48
405	5	"When I Get to the Border"	Jesse Williams	Julie Wong	November 3, 2022	3.13
406	6	"Thunderstruck"	Michael Watkins	Jase Miles-Perez	November 10, 2022	3.72
407	7	"I'll Follow the Sun"	Debbie Allen	Krista Vernoff	February 23, 2023	3.60
408	8	"All Star"	Allison Liddi-Brown	Briana Belser	March 2, 2023	3.08
409	9	"Love Don't Cost a Thing"	Kevin McKidd	Jess Righthand	March 9, 2023	3.18
410	10	"Sisters Are Doin' It for Themselves"	Linda Klein	Tameson Duffy	March 16, 2023	3.46
411	11	"Training Day"	Kim Raver	Meg Marinis & Julie Wong	March 23, 2023	3.36
412	12	"Pick Yourself Up"	Kevin McKidd	Scott D. Brown	March 30, 2023	3.70
413	13	"Cowgirls Don't Cry"	Chandra Wilson	Mark Driscoll	April 6, 2023	3.31
414	14	"Shadow of Your Love"	Allison Liddi-Brown	Beto Skubs	April 13, 2023	3.15
415	15	"Mama Who Bore Me"	Linda Klein	Alyssa Margarite Jacobson	April 13, 2023	3.15
416	16	"Gunpowder and Lead"	Morenike Joela Evans	Michelle Lirtzman	April 20, 2023	3.35
417	17	"Come Fly with Me"	Amyn Kaderali	Kingsley Ume	May 4, 2023	3.10
418	18	"Ready to Run"	Allison Liddi-Brown	Julie Wong	May 11, 2023	2.99
419	19	"Wedding Bell Blues"	Kevin McKidd	Krista Vernoff and Meg Marinis	May 18, 2023	3.02
420	20	"Happily Ever After?"	Debbie Allen	Meg Marinis	May 18, 2023	3.02

=== Season 20 (2024) ===
No. overall	No. in season	Title	Directed by	Written by	Original release date	U.S. viewers (millions)
421	1	"We've Only Just Begun"	Kevin McKidd	Meg Marinis	March 14, 2024	3.62
422	2	"Keep the Family Close"	Allison Liddi-Brown	Briana Belser & Jess Righthand	March 21, 2024	3.50
423	3	"Walk on the Ocean"	Debbie Allen	Mark Driscoll & Beto Skubs	March 28, 2024	3.26
424	4	"Baby Can I Hold You"	Morenike Joela Evans	Jase Miles-Perez	April 4, 2024	3.23
425	5	"Never Felt So Alone"	Debbie Allen	Tameson Duffy & Kingsley Ume	April 11, 2024	3.25
426	6	"The Marathon Continues"	Amyn Kaderali	Sandra Hamada	May 2, 2024	2.92
427	7	"She Used to Be Mine"	Debbie Allen	Scott D. Brown & Jamie Denbo	May 9, 2024	3.07
428	8	"Blood, Sweat and Tears"	Chandra Wilson	Megan Chan Meinero	May 16, 2024	2.75
429	9	"I Carry Your Heart"	Kevin McKidd	Michelle Lirtzman	May 23, 2024	3.02
430	10	"Burn It Down"	Debbie Allen	Julie Wong	May 30, 2024	3.48

=== Season 21 (2024–25) ===
- Jake Borelli (Dr. Levi Schmitt) and Midori Francis (Dr. Mika Yusuda) left the series by episode 7 and 8, respectively. Borelli is credited as a series regular for episode 17, "Love You Like a Love Song".
- Jason George (Dr. Ben Warren) joined as a series regular again once the spin-off Station 19 concluded.
- ABC Signature was replaced by 20th Television after episode 8, "Drop It Like It's Hot".

No. overall	No. in season	Title	Directed by	Written by	Original release date	U.S. viewers (millions)
431	1	"If Walls Could Talk"	Debbie Allen	Meg Marinis	September 26, 2024	2.70
432	2	"Take Me to Church"	Kevin McKidd	Michelle Lirtzman	October 3, 2024	2.51
433	3	"I Can See Clearly Now"	Victoria Mahoney	Mark Driscoll	October 10, 2024	2.36
434	4	"This One's for the Girls"	Debbie Allen	Briana Belser	October 17, 2024	2.04
435	5	"You Make My Heart Explode"	Vanessa Parise	Zoanne Clack	October 24, 2024	2.17
436	6	"Night Moves"	Bille Woodruff	Jase Miles-Perez	November 7, 2024	2.04
437	7	"If You Leave"	Allison Liddi-Brown	Tameson Duffy	November 14, 2024	2.13
438	8	"Drop It Like It's Hot"	Kevin McKidd	Jess Righthand	November 21, 2024	2.28
439	9	"Hit the Floor"	Linda Klein	Jamie Denbo	March 6, 2025	2.24
440	10	"Jump (for My Love)"	Jesse Williams	Julie Wong	March 13, 2025	1.96
441	11	"I Still Haven't Found What I'm Looking For"	Allison Liddi-Brown	Carol Brown	March 20, 2025	2.39
442	12	"Ridin' Solo"	Kevin McKidd	Sandra Hamada	March 27, 2025	2.42
443	13	"Don't You (Forget About Me)"	Kim Raver	Julie Wong & Michelle Lirtzman	April 3, 2025	2.12
444	14	"Love in the Ice Age"	Morenike Joela Evans	Kingsley Ume	April 10, 2025	2.02
445	15	"Bust Your Windows"	Lisa Leone	Scott D. Brown	April 17, 2025	1.88
446	16	"Papa Was a Rollin' Stone"	Chandra Wilson	Jess Righthand	May 1, 2025	2.04
447	17	"Love You Like a Love Song"	Kevin McKidd	Michelle Lirtzman & Julie Wong	May 8, 2025	2.04
448	18	"How Do I Live"	Debbie Allen	Meg Marinis	May 15, 2025	2.28

=== Season 22 (2025–26) ===
- Kevin McKidd (Dr. Owen Hunt) and Kim Raver (Dr. Teddy Altman) departed the series following the season finale, "Bridge over Troubled Water".

No. overall	No. in season	Title	Directed by	Written by	Original release date	U.S. viewers (millions)
449	1	"Only the Strong Survive"	Debbie Allen	Meg Marinis	October 9, 2025	2.61
450	2	"We Built This City"	Kevin McKidd	Zoanne Clack	October 16, 2025	2.22
451	3	"Between Two Lungs"	Debbie Allen	Sandra Hamada	October 23, 2025	2.16
452	4	"Goodbye Horses"	Sammi Cannold	Jase Miles-Perez	October 30, 2025	2.13
453	5	"Sometimes I Feel Like a Motherless Child"	Bille Woodruff	Jess Righthand	November 6, 2025	2.04
454	6	"When I Crash"	Phylicia Rashad	Michelle Lirtzman	November 13, 2025	1.84
455	7	"Skyfall"	Allison Liddi-Brown	Carol Brown	January 8, 2026	2.04
456	8	"Heavy On Me"	Lisa Leone	Tameson Duffy	January 15, 2026	2.23
457	9	"Fortunate Son"	Kim Raver	Julie Wong	January 22, 2026	2.45
458	10	"Strip That Down"	Kevin McKidd	Min-Woo Park	January 29, 2026	2.44
459	11	"(If You Want It) Do It Yourself"	Linda Klein	Scott D. Brown	February 26, 2026	2.25
460	12	"Get Lucky"	Chandra Wilson	Jess Righthand	March 5, 2026	2.15
461	13	"Love the Way You Lie"	Allison Liddi-Brown	Sophia Arnao	March 12, 2026	2.22
462	14	"Wrecking Ball"	Kevin McKidd	Michelle Lirtzman	March 19, 2026	2.37
463	15	"Take Me to the River"	Bille Woodruff	Jase Miles-Perez	March 26, 2026	2.65
464	16	"Feel It Still"	Jake Borelli	Sandra Hamada	April 2, 2026	2.38
465	17	"Through the Fire"	Linda Klein	Julie Wong	April 30, 2026	2.21
466	18	"Bridge Over Troubled Water"	Kevin McKidd	Meg Marinis	May 7, 2026	2.69

=== Season 23 (2026-27) ===
No. overall	No. in season	Title	Directed by	Written by	Original release date
467	1	"Collide"	Debbie Allen	Meg Marinis & Jess Righthand	October 15, 2026
468	2	"Slippin' and Slidin'"	Linda Klein	Michelle Lirtzman	October 22, 2026
469	3	"It's All Wrong, but It's All Right"	Debbie Allen	Jase Miles-Perez	October 29, 2026
470	4	"Love on the Brain"	Nefertite Nguvu	Scott D. Brown	November 5, 2026
471	5	"Stronger (What Doesn't Kill You)"	Jake Borelli	Zoanne Clack	November 12, 2026
472	6	"Till I Collapse"	Allison Liddi-Brown	Sandra Hamada	November 19, 2026
473	7	TBA	TBA	Julie Wong	January 7, 2027

== Specials ==
No.	Title	Narrated by	Aired between	Original release date	U.S. viewers (millions)
1	"Straight to the Heart"	Steven W. Bailey as Joe, the Bartender	"Grandma Got Run Over By a Reindeer" "Begin the Begin"	January 8, 2006	16.30
2	"Under Pressure"	Steven W. Bailey as Joe, the Bartender	"The Name of the Game" "Blues for Sister Someone"	April 23, 2006	14.57
3	"Complications of the Heart"	Steven W. Bailey as Joe, the Bartender	"Losing My Religion" "Time Has Come Today"	September 21, 2006	13.70
4	"Every Moment Counts"	Jeffrey Dean Morgan as Denny Duquette	"My Favorite Mistake" "Time After Time"	April 12, 2007	12.58
5	"Come Rain or Shine"	Editors of People	"Didn't We Almost Have It All?" "A Change is Gonna Come"	September 19, 2007	7.14

== Webisodes ==
=== Seattle Grace: On Call ===
No.	Title	Directed by	Written by	Original release date
1	"I Want a Paternity Test"	David Greenspan	Chris Van Dusen	November 19, 2009
2	"Why is Megan Crying?"	David Greenspan	Chris Van Dusen	December 3, 2009
3	"Have a Good One!"	David Greenspan	Austin Guzman	December 10, 2009
4	"I Guess That's a No!"	Susan Vaill	Chris Van Dusen	December 17, 2009
5	"Way to Make a Scene!"	Susan Vaill	Austin Guzman	January 14, 2010
6	"We Need to Disband!"	Susan Vaill	Chris Van Dusen	January 21, 2010

=== Seattle Grace: Message of Hope ===
No.	Title	Directed by	Written by	Original release date
1	"No Comment"	Kevin McKidd	Chris Van Dusen	October 14, 2010
2	"Take One"	Kevin McKidd	Chris Van Dusen	October 21, 2010
3	"The Face"	David Greenspan	Chris Van Dusen	October 28, 2010
4	"Nerves"	David Greenspan	Miguel Nolla	November 4, 2010
5	"Award-Winning"	Kevin McKidd	Chris Van Dusen	November 11, 2010
6	"The Sizzle"	Kevin McKidd	Tim Day	November 18, 2010

=== Grey's Anatomy: B-Team ===
No.	Title	Directed by	Written by	Original release date
1	"Episode One"	Sarah Drew	Barbara Kaye Friend	January 11, 2018
2	"Episode Two"	Sarah Drew	Barbara Kaye Friend	January 11, 2018
3	"Episode Three"	Sarah Drew	Barbara Kaye Friend	January 11, 2018
4	"Episode Four"	Sarah Drew	Barbara Kaye Friend	January 11, 2018
5	"Episode Five"	Sarah Drew	Barbara Kaye Friend	January 11, 2018
6	"Episode Six"	Sarah Drew	Barbara Kaye Friend	January 11, 2018
