= We Didn't Start the Fire (disambiguation) =

"We Didn't Start the Fire" is a 1989 song by the American singer-songwriter Billy Joel.

We Didn't Start the Fire may also refer to:

- "We Didn't Start the Fire" (Grey's Anatomy), a 2019 episode of the television series
- We Didn't Start the Fire (podcast), a modern history podcast
- "We Didn't Start the Fire", an episode of East New York (TV series)
- "We Didn't Start the Fire" (Fall Out Boy song), a cover of the Billy Joel song by Fall Out Boy, updated for events from 1989 to 2023
