= Doubt (American TV series) =

- Genre: Legal drama
- Created by: Tony Phelan; Joan Rater
- Starring: Katherine Heigl; Dulé Hill; Laverne Cox; Dreama Walker; Kobi Libii; Steven Pasquale; Elliott Gould
- Composer: Sean Callery
- Country of origin: United States
- Original language: English
- No. of seasons: 1
- No. of episodes: 13

Production
- Executive producers: Tony Phelan; Joan Rater; Carl Beverly; Sarah Timberman; Adam Bernstein
- Producer: John Cockrell
- Production location: New York City, New York
- Running time: 43 minutes
- Production companies: Midwest Livestock; Timberman/Beverly Productions; CBS Television Studios

Original release
- Network: CBS
- Release: February 15 – August 12, 2017

Doubt is an American drama television series that premiered on CBS on February 15, 2017, and concluded on August 12, 2017. The series was created by Tony Phelan and Joan Rater, and stars Katherine Heigl in the lead role of Sadie Ellis, a brilliant attorney who falls for her client (Steven Pasquale), an altruistic pediatric surgeon recently accused of murdering his girlfriend 24 years earlier. CBS gave the show a series order in May 2016. After only two episodes had aired, CBS announced that they were pulling the series from their schedule, leaving the future of the remaining unaired episodes in doubt. It was the first official cancellation of the 2016–17 season, following weak viewership. CBS later announced that the series would return on July 1, 2017 to burn off the remaining 11 episodes.

== Cast and characters ==
- Katherine Heigl as Sadie Ellis, a defense attorney at Roth & Associates, an elite New York law firm run by her foster father, Isaiah Roth. Sadie is defending Billy Brennan, but begins to develop feelings for him.
- Dulé Hill as Albert Cobb, Sadie's best friend, and co-worker at Roth & Associates.
- Laverne Cox as Cameron "Cam" Wirth, Sadie's co-worker. A transgender woman and Yale Law School alumna, Cam feels passionate about her work, especially in cases involving civil rights for minorities. Cam begins dating DA Peter Garrett, her former classmate at Yale.
- Dreama Walker as Tiffany Simon, Sadie's co-worker, and Cam's frequent collaborator. Tiffany is a recent law school graduate, who was raised in Iowa.
- Kobi Libii as Nick Brady, a reformed convict, who comes to the firm as a recent parolee. He studied law while incarcerated.
- Steven Pasquale as William "Billy" Brennan, a prominent surgeon, who is on trial for the murder of his ex-girlfriend, Amy Meyers, 26 years prior. Billy grew up in a tumultuous family, with his senator father and mother's marriage on the rocks, and his adoptive sister resenting him. Billy eventually falls in love with Sadie, and they begin a secret relationship.
- Elliott Gould as Isaiah Roth, a prominent lawyer in New York City, who takes pride in defending the defenseless. Isaiah raised Sadie, following her mother's incarceration. He is concerned Sadie and Billy's relationship will jeopardize not only Billy's conviction, but Sadie's future as well.

=== Recurring ===
- Judith Light as Carolyn Rice, Sadie's mother. Carolyn has been incarcerated for the past thirty years, after a robbery she participated in went wrong and a police officer ended up fatally shot. Following her sentencing, Sadie was raised by Isaiah Roth, Carolyn's close friend and lawyer. Later in the series, Carolyn reveals she has stage four cancer, and wants to be with Sadie when she dies.
- Lauren Blumenfeld as Lucy Alexander, Sadie's absent-minded assistant.
- Tara Karsian as Tanya, the firm's receptionist.
- Ben Lawson as DA Peter Garrett, the district attorney, who is Cam's former classmate. He frequently pursues her romantically, but she wants to take things slow.
- Cassidy Freeman as ADA Audrey Burris.
- Patrick Fischler as ADA Alan Markes.
- Larry Sullivan as ADA Asher Lowman.

== Episodes ==
No.	Title	Directed by	Written by	Original release date	US viewers (millions)
1	"Pilot"	Adam Bernstein	Joan Rater & Tony Phelan	February 15, 2017	5.31
2	"Then and Now"	James Strong	Joan Rater & Tony Phelan	February 22, 2017	4.03
3	"Poison Prize"	Nicole Rubio	David Feige	July 1, 2017	1.66
4	"Clean Burn"	Daisy von Scherler Mayer	John A. Norris	July 8, 2017	1.62
5	"Not a Word"	Chris Misiano	Pamela Wechsler	July 8, 2017	1.59
6	"Faith"	Nicole Rubio	Don Roos	July 15, 2017	1.61
7	"Where Do We Go from Here"	Jeannot Szwarc	Louisa Levy	July 22, 2017	1.89
8	"Top Dog/Underdog"	Jonathan Brown	John Cockrell	July 22, 2017	1.80
9	"To See, to Tell"	Matt Earl Beesley	Heather F. Robb	July 29, 2017	1.70
Tiffany's fiancé breaks off the engagement. Albert finds out that Sadie has been in a relationship with Billy for some time and says he's off the case and will leave the firm.
10	"Finally"	Maja Vrvilo	David Feige	August 5, 2017	1.92
Billy's trial starts. Albert takes over the case after he finds out that Sadie and Billy have been sleeping together. Nick is tasked with digging up dirt on Russo and finds out that Billy's mother and Mrs Myers used to be friends. Furthermore, it looks like evidence has been tampered with to convict Billy of killing his ex-girlfriend Amy Myers. The lab technician comes under suspicion of interpreting results to help Russo win cases. Cam faces Peter in court over a young man who has been caught tagging. Sadie tells Cam she must disclose her relationship with Peter to the judge and her client. When Cam later speaks with Peter about making their relationship public, Peter realises that he is not quite ready to be judged for dating a black transgender colleague. Cam breaks up with Peter. Sadie is trying to get Albert to forgive her for lying about Billy. Isaiah tells Billy that he has to let Sadie go if he's convicted of murder. Billy's sister Molly testifies that she saw Billy stand over Amy's dead body and that later, her mother sent her back to Korea as a way of silencing her. Sadie uses Molly's therapy session tapes to prove that Molly was angry about Billy and felt alienated from her adoptive mother. It turns out that Billy's prosecution was bought and paid for by Amy Myer's mother. Now, Albert and Sadie have a real chance of winning Billy's case.
11	"I'm in If You Are"	Rob Greenlea	Imogen Binnie	August 5, 2017	1.98
Sadie and Albert prep for trial and decide that Billy will not testify. The detective who interviewed Billy in 1991 reveals that Amy's mother made sure that the case would be revisited every year for 26 years in the hope of convicting Amy's murderer. Mrs. Myers had contributed to Ms Russo's campaign for DA, ensuring that Billy would be convicted. Sadie calls the DA to the stand but the DA shatters Sadie's defense. Nick and Tiffany handle an appeal at the prison where Nick used to be incarcerated. Alan confides in Albert that Russo personally ordered the re-investigation into Billy's case and Alan was to give a confidential recommendation that the Brennan case should not be presented to the grand jury. It is still uncertain if Billy Brennan really did kill Amy but Russo was to ensure this narrative. Alan gives Albert suppressed information from the original investigation. There was an alternate suspect, Eli Wagner, a low-level drug dealer from a nearby school who claimed he was friends with Amy. Russo had withheld this information from Albert and Sadie on purpose. Eli testifies that he and Amy had an affair. Amy was going to break up with Billy but Amy was afraid of Billy's temper but Albert establishes Eli's history of violence against women. Receptionist Tonya encourages Cam to forgive Peter. Peter shows up at Cam's work and wants her back but Cam doesn't trust him anymore and doesn't accept his apology. However, later she reconsiders and agrees to attend a work party with Peter. With Russo under fire, Peter is in line for becoming the acting DA. Billy goes against Sadie and Albert's advice and decides to testify. Billy comments that he saw Amy's face after she was murdered, which creates doubt in Sadie, Albert and the prosecutor about Billy's innocence. Cam and Isaiah appeal to the governor trying to get Sadie's mother Carolyn Rice out of prison without success.
12	"Running Out of Time"	Jerry Levine	John A. Norris	August 12, 2017	1.73
A woman with blood spatter all over herself walks into a police station and confesses that she killed her best friend Brenda in her sleep while Tiffany is at the precinct. Tiffany decides to represent the woman with Cam's help and Alison is acquitted but as Alison leaves the court room, Tiffany sees Alison and Brenda's husband smile at each other. They might have gotten away with murder. Sadie is preparing for closing arguments after Billy torpedoed his own case with his testimony. At the start of the session, Abby tells Sadie about the clemency request filed to get Carolyn released due to her cancer, which Sadie didn't know about. The jury votes 11 vs 1 and Billy asks Sadie to push for a verdict. Peter finds out that his election for acting DA is under threat because of his relationship with Cam. Nick has his character interview and is uncertain about whether to tell the truth about a death that occurred during his prison sentence.
13	"The Return"	Tony Phelan	Joan Rater & Tony Phelan	August 12, 2017	1.80
The jury find Billy Brennan not guilty and Billy proposes to Sadie and she accepts. Sadie tries to get Albert to stay with the firm but Albert ends up going independent. Nick tells Tiffany that he likes her and they share a kiss. Cam apologizes to Sadie for not telling her about her Mom's cancer and Nick is being questioned about Danny Lazito's death. Albert is taking on Nick's case. Nick is late picking up a client from a day-release from prison and as a result the client's sentence gets increased from 30 days to 2 years. In the end, however, Cam manages to get the new sentence overthrown. Nick is being arrested and Carolyn is finally being released. Peter loses out on the job as acting DA of New York but is thinking of running in the General Election. Later, Billy's mother wants to throw him a party. Sadie meets Billy's cousin Max who tells him that 10 years ago, Billy almost died and needed a bone marrow transplant from Max. This means that Billy's blood is now different than 26 years ago. Sadie thinks Billy killed Amy and she helped him get away with it.

== Production ==
The series was originally proposed for the 2015–2016 television season, originally casting KaDee Strickland and Teddy Sears in the lead roles. However, CBS decided to retool the series for the 2016–2017 television season, with Heigl and Pasquale re-cast in the lead roles, and picked it up on May 14, 2016. Cox's casting in the series has made her the first transgender person to play a transgender series regular on broadcast television.

Although CBS canceled the series after just two episodes, a total of 13 episodes were produced.

== Reception ==
The first season of Doubt has received mixed reviews from television critics. Review aggregator website Rotten Tomatoes reported an approval rating of 53%, based on 30 reviews, with an average rating of 5.8/10. The site's critical consensus reads, "Doubt struggles with tone in its premiere episode, but ultimately develops into a decent courtroom/workplace drama that is buoyed by a talented cast." Metacritic reported a score of 58 out of 100, based on 25 critics, indicating "mixed or average reviews".

=== Ratings ===
Viewership and ratings per episode of Doubt
No.	Title	Air date	Rating/share (18–49)	Viewers (millions)	DVR (18–49)	DVR viewers (millions)	Total (18–49)	Total viewers (millions)
1	"Pilot"	February 15, 2017	0.8/3	5.31	—N/a	2.34	—N/a	7.64
2	"Then and Now"	February 22, 2017	0.6/2	4.03	TBD	TBD	TBD	TBD
3	"Poison Prize"	July 1, 2017	0.2/1	1.66	TBD	TBD	TBD	TBD
4	"Clean Burn"	July 8, 2017	0.2/1	1.62	TBD	TBD	TBD	TBD
5	"Not a Word"	July 8, 2017	0.2/1	1.59	TBD	TBD	TBD	TBD
6	"Faith"	July 15, 2017	0.2/1	1.61	0.1	0.64	0.3	2.25
7	"Where Do We Go from Here"	July 22, 2017	0.1/0	1.89	0.1	0.67	0.2	2.56
8	"Top Dog/underdog"	July 22, 2017	0.2/1	1.80	0.1	0.66	0.3	2.46
9	"To See, To Tell"	July 29, 2017	0.2/1	1.70	TBD	TBD	TBD	TBD
10	"Finally"	August 5, 2017	0.2/1	1.92	0.1	0.66	0.3	2.57
11	"I'm in If You Are"	August 5, 2017	0.2/1	1.98	0.1	0.68	0.3	2.66
12	"Running Out of Time"	August 12, 2017	0.2/1	1.73	0.1	0.63	0.3	1.36
13	"The Return"	August 12, 2017	0.2/1	1.80	0.1	0.68	0.3	2.48
