= Sheriff Country =

American police procedural action drama television series

- Genre: Police procedural; Action drama; Crime drama
- Created by: Joan Rater; Tony Phelan; Max Thieriot
- Based on: Fire Country by: Max Thieriot; Tony Phelan; Joan Rater
- Starring: Morena Baccarin; Matt Lauria; Christopher Gorham; Michele Weaver; W. Earl Brown; Amanda Arcuri; Ian Quinlan
- Country of origin: United States
- Original language: English
- No. of seasons: 2
- No. of episodes: 26

Production
- Executive producers: Max Thieriot; Tony Phelan; Joan Rater; Jerry Bruckheimer; KristieAnne Reed; Matt Lopez; James Strong
- Producers: Obiageli Odimegwu; Tamara Isaac; Morena Baccarin; Asher Landay; Thom J. Pretak
- Production companies: Jerry Bruckheimer Television; Midwest Livestock Productions; Daily Dramatic Productions; CBS Studios

Original release
- Network: CBS
- Release: October 17, 2025 – present

Related
- Fire Country

Sheriff Country is an American police procedural drama television series created by Joan Rater, Tony Phelan, and Max Thieriot for CBS, starring Morena Baccarin in the lead role and also starring Christopher Gorham, Michele Weaver, Matt Lauria, and W. Earl Brown. It is produced by Jerry Bruckheimer Television and CBS Studios. Sheriff Country is the first spin-off of the Fire Country franchise. The series premiered on October 17, 2025. In December 2025, the series was renewed for a second season which premiered on October 9, 2026.

== Plot ==
Sheriff Mickey Fox investigates the criminal activity in Edgewater County, California, while contending with her ex-con father, Wes, and her wayward daughter, Skye. An early plotline focuses on the murder of Skye's ex-boyfriend, Brandon, a recovering addict.

== Cast ==
=== Main ===
- Morena Baccarin as Michaela "Mickey" Fox, sheriff of Edgewater County in northern California
- Matt Lauria as Lt. Nathan Boone, a deputy who is second-in-command of Mickey's department, and a former Oakland PD officer.
- Christopher Gorham as ADA Travis Fraley, Mickey's ex-husband and father of her daughter. He works as a lawyer for the DA.
- Michele Weaver as Deputy Cassidy Campbell, one of the station's deputies and Travis' ex-girlfriend. She became a deputy to look for her sister.
- W. Earl Brown as Wes Fox, Mickey's father, former convict and an off-the-grid marijuana grower.
- Amanda Arcuri as Skye Fraley (season 2; recurring season 1), Mickey and Travis' newly sober daughter.
- Ian Quinlan as Deputy Enrique "Hank" Iglesias (season 2; recurring season 1), one of the station's deputies.

=== Recurring ===
- Caroline Rhea as Gina Fletcher, an ECSO administrative assistant.
- Tony White as Jerry, a thrift shop owner.
- Mark Taylor as Ruben Massey, the DA of Edgewater County, CA.
- Susan Misner as Nora Boone, Nathan's estranged wife.
- Kelli O'Hara as Miranda Fraley, Travis' sister.
- Rachel Ticotin as Eva Santos/Maria Fox, a DEA Deputy Director, who is also Mickey's supposedly dead mother.
- Jenny Raven as Emmy Yorke, a medical examiner in Edgewater that begins a romantic relationship with Boone

=== Crossover characters from Fire Country ===
- Max Thieriot as Bode Donovan-Leone, Mickey's former step-nephew and a Cal Fire firefighter.
- Diane Farr as Sharon Leone, Mickey's former step sister, Bode's mother and a Cal Fire Division Chief.
- Kevin Alejandro as Manuel "Manny" Perez, a Cal Fire battalion chief and former Captain of Three Rock.
- Jules Latimer as Eve Edwards, Bode's best friend, a Cal Fire firefighter and Captain of Three Rock.
- Jordan Calloway as Jake Crawford, a Cal Fire firefighter, now Station 42 Captain.

=== Notable guest star ===
- Maren Morris as Hazel, Skye's sponsor.

== Episodes ==
=== Series overview ===
Season	Episodes	Originally released	
Season	Episodes	First released	Last released
1	20	October 17, 2025	May 22, 2026
2	TBA	October 9, 2026	TBA

=== Season 1 (2025–26) ===
No. overall	No. in season	Title	Directed by	Written by	Original release date	U.S. viewers (millions)
1	1	"Pilot"	James Strong	Teleplay by : Joan Rater & Tony Phelan; Story by : Joan Rater & Tony Phelan & Max Thieriot	October 17, 2025	4.38
Interim Sheriff Mickey Fox struggles with the return of her drug addicted daughter Skye, the possibility of running for election against her partner Nathan Boone who is backed by the local Rotary Club and a case involving three kids and their abusive parents. Following a high-stakes car chase, the kids are rescued and Mickey publicly accepts her role as sheriff, calling upon the town to help her. Boone backs her, but submits his resignation. Learning that her estranged weed grower father Wes is going legal, Mickey invites Wes to live with her and Skye, only to have Skye's drug dealer boyfriend Brandon rob Wes. After an argument with Brandon, Skye steals drugs from him and turns them over to Bode Leone to destroy. Skye later comes home covered in blood with the news that Brandon has been murdered.
2	2	"Firewall"	Kevin Alejandro	Matt Lopez	October 24, 2025	4.51
Boone investigates Brandon's murder, learning that he had gotten into a fight with Skye over the stolen drugs and that the murder weapon is missing, implicating Skye as the killer. Wes urges his granddaughter not to cooperate and contemplates trying to flee the country with her while Mickey fights with her ex-husband Travis over how to handle the situation, complicated by Travis' relationship with Mickey's deputy Cassidy Campbell. Mickey investigates the abduction of three young men by violent growers after one of them manages to escape. With the help of Sharon, Mickey and Cassidy locate the boys in time to rescue them. Mickey confides in Sharon who tells her that Bode confirms Skye's story about going to him to flush the stolen drugs.
3	3	"The Sixth Man"	Kevin Alejandro	Safia M. Dirie	October 31, 2025	4.57
Mickey investigates an armored truck robbery and is left with six suspects who had been hired to wear the outfit of the robber for a painting job. The cops arrest Dawson Raines who gives Mickey a lead tying the getaway car to a nearby car dealership owned by husband and wife Tom and Heather; Dawson is revealed to be an undercover DEA agent sleeping with Mickey. Mickey and Boone disagree on which of the two is responsible and their tactics. Mickey and Boone play the two against each other and trick them into revealing that they were both responsible. Boone applies for a job in Oakland and Mickey gives him her support. Skye deals with harassment and death threats from Brandon's brothers who Wes threatens to make back off. Travis' sister and nephew Miranda and Rick visit with Rick asking Skye not to mention that he was friends with Brandon. Skye reveals that she bought the knife that was used to murder Brandon before Boone, after learning that Mickey had arrested and released Brandon, shows up with a search warrant, worried that Mickey is helping Skye cover up the murder.
4	4	"Out of Office"	Edward Ornelas	Obiageli Odimegwu	November 7, 2025	4.63
In a flashback, Skye finds Brandon dead and picks up the knife. After she runs away, a gloved hand takes the knife. Skye is arrested for murder after the receipt for the knife is found. The district attorney, who has political ambitions, takes control of the case from Boone, causing Mickey to take a vacation to investigate on her own in secret. In an attempt to protect Skye, Wes confesses to the murder. Mickey visits Brandon's house to learn more about him and finds a hidden phone revealing that he knew her drug addict nephew, Rick Fraley, who reveals that Brandon owed a lot of money to a drug dealer. After a conversation with Travis about her reluctance to rely on anyone else, Mickey enlists Dawson's help. Mickey breaks into the evidence room to get the drugs she took from Brandon; Boone lets her go due to his own doubts. Dawson links them to Adrian Lee Smith who tries to kill Mickey when confronted, forcing Dawson to break his cover and kill Adrian to save her. The murder weapon is found amongst Adrian's belongings, exonerating Skye. Dawson reveals that his real name is Alec Kane before leaving town. Cassidy struggles with having to evict a family, but finds an unconventional solution by having them move in with a lonely elderly widow. Boone gets a call officially offering him the job in Oakland.
5	5	"Expecting Trouble"	Edward Ornelas	Mark Bruner	November 14, 2025	4.94
6	6	"Exit Interview"	Holly Dale	Heather F. Robb & Matt Lopez	November 21, 2025	5.08
7	7	"Glory Days"	Holly Dale	Mark Wilding	December 5, 2025	N/A
8	8	"Death & Taxes"	Sarah Wayne Callies	Matt Lopez	December 12, 2025	N/A
9	9	"Crucible"	Gonzalo Amat	Seth Harrington	December 19, 2025	N/A
10	10	"Crucible"	Gonzalo Amat	Adair Cole	February 27, 2026	N/A
11	11	"The Aftermath"	Sarah Wayne Callies	Heather F. Robb	March 6, 2026	N/A
12	12	"Plus One"	Edward Ornelas	Melissa Carter	March 13, 2026	N/A
A housewife goes crazy due to a bad batch of synthetic weed being inadvertently circulated through Edgewater by a dealer called the Apothecary. Soon, the drugs have negative effects on a number of people throughout town. A tip from Wes leads first to an elderly grower who used be known as the Apothecary and then the son of the first victim who mowed the Apothecary's lawn and used his name and supplies to create and sell his own drugs. After the case, Mickey and Boone go to a fancy birthday dinner together while Wes takes Gina to chemotherapy. Cassidy meets with a witness who reveals that he and Zoey had gone to the annual Blood Moon Festival together on the night that she disappeared. Cassidy's investigation reveals a disturbing pattern of girls who almost nobody will miss vanishing every two years around the time of the festival for twenty years. With the festival two weeks away, Cassidy believes that a serial killer is stalking it and is about to strike again.
13	13	"The Finest"	Edward Ornelas	Seth Harrington & Matt Lopez	April 3, 2026	N/A
During the annual Fire vs. PD baseball game, the two rival teams see an explosion off in the distance and discover that a bus full of kids were kidnapped, forcing the two to work together to save them. Amidst tensions between them, Bode and Boone partner up to track down the bombmaker. Meanwhile, Sharon's mother Ruby causes some tension between Mickey and Sharon. It's eventually discovered that the kidnapping was originally planned by a city official who identifies one of the men he hired. However, the official has lost control over the situation. Bode and Boone find the container with the missing kids buried in a quarry, but get caught in an explosion after setting off a boobytrap. This is the first episode of a two-part crossover that concludes on Fire Country.
14	14	"Show of Force"	Ruben Garcia	Jamie Conway	April 10, 2026	N/A
Hank's attempt to transport a car thief goes awry when the man steals Hank's cruiser while he's getting a burrito; it turns out that the man wanted to attend his daughter's quinceañera before going to jail. The day before the Blood Moon Festival, Cassidy brings Mickey her theory about a serial killer stalking the festival, her sister Zoey being one of his victims. Mickey allows Cassidy to search a remote part of Deadwater where the jawbone of one of the missing girls was found in 2008 and Cassidy locates the remains of two of the victims, proving her theory. Mickey struggles with bureaucracy from Punch and frustration that a serial killer operated undetected for decades. The festival's artist is arrested under the belief that he's the Blood Moon Killer, but it's discovered too late that he has an alibi. Outside of her house, Cassidy is abducted by the real killer.
15	15	"The Lost Girls of Edgewater County"	Ruben Garcia	Obiageli Odimegwu	April 17, 2026	N/A
Cassidy manages to leave Mickey a distress call before being abducted and awakens chained in the killer's basement with his previous victim, Jane. As Cassidy calls upon everything Mickey taught her to survive, Mickey and Boone identify the Blood Moon Killer as former deputy Ellis Monroe who was working as a security guard at the festival, but he has an airtight alibi for Cassidy's kidnapping. Mickey and Boone interview Romy Hale who had a near miss with Ellis decades before and realize from Romy's story that Ellis' first victim, Dana, has become his accomplice. When tracked down, Dana turns out to be Stephanie Witwer, a social worker who was helping Cassidy. Dana is arrested while Mickey kills Ellis when he tries to use Cassidy as a hostage. Cassidy is able to convince Dana to reveal where Ellis buried his victims, including Zoey, and takes time off to go on a road trip with her mother in a car Cassidy and Zoey were fixing up.
16	16	"Twenty Four Candles"	Nicole Rubio	Mark Wilding	April 24, 2026	N/A
17	17	"The Hunting Party"	Nicole Rubio	Heather F. Robb & Melissa Carter	May 1, 2026	N/A
While at the annual Boar hunt at the Fraley Estate, one of the investors is shot and killed. Mickey and Boone begin to investigate Miranda's enemies, only to learn she might've been the target. As a result, Miranda and Rick go to stay at Mickey's home. Everything come to a head at Mickey's home where Miranda is held at gun point and her guards had been attacked. Meanwhile, Wes and an old friend team up to convince the other growers into getting their money back from the DEA. After saving Miranda, Mickey calls up Alec and he is at her home when he learns of the heist.
18	18	"The Gambler"	Tara Miele	Adair Cole	May 8, 2026	N/A
19	19	"Compromised"	Tara Miele	Mark Bruner	May 15, 2026	N/A
Deputy Director Santos investigates Mickey for possible corruption while Miranda Fraley is revealed to be behind Emerald Eden and Mickey and Alec grow closer. Skye seemingly relapses on fentanyl, but it's quickly discovered that she was poisoned by Miranda's son Rick after Rick caught her snooping around, although Miranda wasn't involved in Rick's actions. Cassidy returns from vacation early to help Boone investigate the death of Mack Maguire which they realize was a setup by Miranda's mysterious hitman rather than a suicide by cop. At night, Rick secretly meets with Alec who is revealed to be the hitman and asks him to kill Skye in the hospital. After Alec seemingly agrees and confirms that the Foxes don't know about his double life, he fatally shots Rick.
20	20	"Mexico"	Tony Phelan	Matt Lopez	May 22, 2026	N/A
After seeing Alec and Miranda arguing, Mickey realizes that Alec is her hitman but plays along with him with Boone soon coming to the same conclusion. Rick's body turns up and Boone and Cassidy discover a witness, Punch's mentally ill homeless brother who Punch disowned for supposedly murdering their mother, Mary. Cassidy later decides to look into Mary's murder to try to bring the brothers back together. Mickey, Boone and Santos lay a trap for Alec by making it appear as if Mickey is about to be arrested as a dirty cop. Alec confesses to Rick's murder, insisting that it was the only way to protect Skye from a dangerous psychopath, and reveals that Rick murdered Brandon and Alec framed Adrian Smith to cover it up. Santos is forced to kill Alec, but Boone is wounded in the process. Mickey arrests Miranda while Travis, at Skye's urging, takes control of the company. Mickey is cleared of any wrongdoing, but Santos blackmails her into running a joint investigation into a Bulgarian cartel with Wes as their confidential informant. A shocked Wes identifies Santos as Maria Fox, Mickey's supposedly dead mother.

=== Season 2 (2026) ===
No. overall	No. in season	Title	Directed by	Written by	Original release date	U.S. viewers (millions)
21	1	"Cyclone"	Edward Ornelas	Matt Lopez	October 9, 2026	5.47
Santos explains that she was sent undercover to take Wes down but genuinely fell in love with him and abandoned her mission. When they were arrested, Santos made a deal with the DEA so that Wes got a short sentence, but in return, she had to fake her death and take an overseas job for a decade. Mickey goes on a bender, prompting fellow sheriff Jim Wade to call Boone and Cassidy. Cassidy continues her investigation into the murder of Punch's mother with the help of Hank who is upset to learn that Cassidy kept the incident with Mickey from him. While drunk, Mickey admits that she regrets rejecting Boone but doesn't remember it in the morning. Mickey refuses to cooperate with Santos, but the cartel targets Donna Hawkins who reveals that the Bulgarians are kidnapping girls to serve as sex slaves and are trafficking cychlorphine or cyclone, a synthetic opioid more lethal than fentanyl. For the sake of Edgewater, Mickey agrees to the joint task force. Although Travis gets the charges against the co-op dropped due to Alec Kane's criminal activities, Wes agrees to help as well for Mickey.
22	2	"Family Trust"	Sarah Wayne Callies	Obiageli Odimegwu	October 16, 2026	5.28
Mickey struggles with working with her parents, dealing with lingering resentment and trust issues. At Mickey's request, Sharon plants a bug in a bakery run as a front by the cartel, but Wes tips them off to earn their trust. Fed up, Mickey decides to handle the case her own way with Boone's help while Wes is seemingly abducted. Travis considers selling the company and blackmails Miranda into agreeing. Cassidy disccovers that Mary Elliot was in a romantic relationship with her best friend Shelia, meaning that she was unexpectedly home when someone tried to rob the house. Andy was drugged via a spiked dose of lithium by Sheila's son Owen, the pharmacy clerk who gave Andy the medicine. Owen confesses to the murder, admitting that he panicked when Mary turned out to be home and recognized him. Andy is exonerated and reunited with Punch.
23	3	"Ulysses"	Sarah Wayne Callies	Heather F. Robb	October 23, 2026	5.19
Wes is brought to the Stoyanovs' compound where he fixes a problem with contaminated groundwater and meets Molly, one of the kidnapped girls. Molly agrees to testify and Wes arranges to help the girls escape. Santos explains that the three men who knew the truth about what she did kept her from returning; after the last recently died, Santos used the Edgewater investigation as an excuse to return. When a group of college students nearly die from cyclone, the task force discovers that Molly's sister Courtney is being forced to distribute it. With Courtney's help, they catch Petar who gives up the lab's location after Mickey shows him proof that Petar is being set up to take the fall. Wes is caught, but kills two guards. The task force raids the lab, but the Stoyanovs escape and Wes and the girls all vanish.
24	4	"Maria"	Tara Miele	Adair Cole	October 30, 2026	5.33
25	5	"No Way In"	Edward Ornelas	Mark Bruner	November 6, 2026	5.54
In the midst of a heavy windstorm and wildfire, three female inmates escape, one of whom, Crystal, has a personal grudge against Mickey. The escape interrupts a bachelor auction and Manny and Mickey are forced to work together, complicated by lingering tensions from their "date from hell" years before. Bode and Boone, working together, discover that one of the guards was working with the women. Heading for Cribb Valley, the inmates are forced to turn back by the wildfire and take a diner full of people hostage after Eve Edwards recognizes them, with Skye and Three Rock inmate Tex amongst the hostages. The three demand a fire engine to drive through Deadwater to reach Cribb Valley and agree to release all but Skye after discovering that she's Mickey's daughter. Mickey offers herself up to save her daughter and Manny is taken hostage as well to drive the engine. With not enough room for everyone, one of the inmates murders their guard accomplice. This is the first episode of a two-part crossover that concludes on Fire Country.
26	6	"Close to the Chest"	Tara Miele	Laura Donney	November 13, 2026	5.66
27	7	"Stand Your Ground"	Nicole Rubio	Seth Harrington	December 11, 2026	TBD
28	8	"Justice Delayed"	Nicole Rubio	Jamie Conway	December 18, 2026	TBD

== Production ==
=== Development ===
On January 23, 2024, CBS was set to develop a police spin-off series of Fire Country, continuing from a back-door pilot episode in season two, with Erika Kennair executive producing through JBTV & CBS Studios, and with Morena Baccarin attached to lead. The episode titled "Alert the Sheriff" introduced Baccarin's character, Edgewater County Sheriff's Sergeant Mickey Fox. On May 2, 2024, it received a straight-to-series order, with CBS Studios joining the production of what would later be titled Sheriff Country, with filming set to take place in Toronto, rather than in Vancouver like the original so that Baccarin could be closer to her family in New York. On June 19, 2024, Matt Lopez was set to be the showrunner of "Sheriff Country," and an executive producer. A fall 2025 premiere was confirmed in March 2025 with a promo airing during broadcasts of March Madness. Production on the spin-off began in May 2025 in the Toronto area with twelve scripts already written, and in July 2025 the premiere date was set for October 17, with the show airing regularly before the original on Fridays after the premiere. On December 3, 2025, CBS renewed the series for a second season.

=== Casting ===
On January 23, 2024, Morena Baccarin was set to star in the lead role of the series. On December 12, 2024, W. Earl Brown was set to star in the lead role of the series. In April 2025, Christopher Gorham, Michele Weaver, and Matt Lauria joined the cast. On May 14, 2025, Amanda Arcuri and Caroline Rhea joined the cast. On April 9, 2026, Arcuri and Ian Quinlan were promoted to series regulars for the second season.

== Release ==
The first season premiered on CBS on October 17, 2025. The second season premiered on October 9, 2026.

== Reception ==
=== Critical response ===
On the review aggregator website Rotten Tomatoes, the series holds an approval rating of 75% based on 8 critic reviews. Metacritic gave the series a weighted average score of 67 out of 100 based on 5 critics, indicating "generally favorable".

=== Ratings ===
Viewership and ratings per episode of Sheriff Country
No.	Title	Air date	Rating/share (18–49)	Viewers (millions)	DVR (18–49)	DVR viewers (millions)	Total (18–49)	Total viewers (millions)	Ref.
1	"Pilot"	October 17, 2025	0.2/3	4.38	0.13	1.86	0.35	6.25	
2	"Firewall"	October 24, 2025	0.2/3	4.51	0.11	1.37	0.34	5.89	
3	"The Sixth Man"	October 31, 2025	0.3/4	4.57	0.11	1.49	0.36	6.07	
4	"Out of Office"	November 7, 2025	0.2/4	4.63	0.11	1.43	0.33	6.06	
5	"Expecting Trouble"	November 14, 2025	0.3/5	4.94	TBD	TBD	TBD	TBD	
6	"Exit Interview"	November 21, 2025	0.3/5	5.08	TBD	TBD	TBD	TBD	
