= Amanda Arcuri =

Canadian actress (born 1997)

- Born: October 21, 1997 (age 29)
- Occupation: Actress
- Years active: 2014–present

Amanda Arcuri is a Canadian actress best known for her role as Lola Pacini in the drama series Degrassi: The Next Generation, a role which she reprised in Degrassi: Next Class,. and for her role as the protagonist's daughter on the series ''Sheriff Country''.

== Career ==
Arcuri's acting career started in high school when she was contacted by voicemail from a casting director. She was cast as fan favorite Lola Pacini in Degrassi: The Next Generation and its follow up series Degrassi: Next Class. In 2018, Arcuri was nominated for a Canadian Screen Award for her performance in the latter. She also had big roles in the film Every Day and as the lead character in the horror film Do Not Reply. She also made a guest appearance in Star Trek: Discovery. Arcuri also had a big role in the romance film Fingernails. She returned to TV in 2025 with a one off appearance in Watson where she played a younger version of Eve Harlow's character, Ingrid. Arcuri currently has a recurring role in the CBS spinoff series Sheriff Country starring Morena Baccarin.

== Personal life ==
Arcuri is of Italian and Argentinean heritage. She was previously in relationships with H8 music and Julien Renout.

== Filmography ==
=== Film ===
Year	Title	Role
2022	Fingernails	Sally
2019	Do Not Reply	[Role not specified]
2018	Believe Me: The Abduction of Lisa McVey	Lorrie McVey
2019	Every Day	Rebecca
2015	Grayscale	[Role not specified]

=== Television ===
Year	Title	Role
2025–present	Sheriff Country	Skye Fraley
2025	Watson	Ingrid Derian
2019–22	Hudson & Rex	Camilla Donovan
2021	Star Trek: Discovery	Val Sasha
2020	Party of Five	Vanessa
2018	Ransom	[Role not specified]
2018	Good Witch	[Role not specified]
2017	Played	[Role not specified]
2016–17	Degrassi: Next Class	Lola Pacini
2015	Degrassi: Don’t Look Back	Lola Pacini
2014–15	Degrassi: The Next Generation	Lola Pacini
2015	Degrassi: Minis	Lola Pacini
