= Elisabeth R. Finch =

American television writer

Elisabeth R. Finch (born March 1978) is an American television writer best known for her work on the series True Blood and Grey's Anatomy.

Finch gained public notoriety for her abrupt resignation from Grey's Anatomy, which was prompted by an investigation into a series of lies that she told about her personal and medical history.

== Career ==
Finch began her career by writing a short film entitled Looking for My Brother, released in 2006. She was then hired as a writers' assistant on True Blood in 2008. She worked on True Blood until 2010 and was credited as a writers' assistant on 17 episodes, as an assistant to writers on five episodes, and as a writer on three episodes.

She wrote two episodes for the first and only season of No Ordinary Family, which aired on ABC from 2010 to 2011. In 2012 she began working on The Vampire Diaries and was credited as a story writer on six episodes, story editor on two episodes, and executive story editor on 15 episodes. Coworkers reportedly gave her the nickname "Vampire Girl" as a joke referencing the niche she had established working on True Blood and The Vampire Diaries during her early career.

In 2015, Finch began working on Grey's Anatomy as a writer and producer. She wrote 13 episodes and produced a total of 172 episodes before she departed from the series. Finch was also a guest actor in the Grey's Anatomy season 15 episode "Silent All These Years", in which she played the role of Nurse Elisabeth. Finch was offered a position in the writers' room at Grey's Anatomy following the publication of a piece that she had written for Elle in 2014 about her diagnosis with chondrosarcoma and her experience working as a television writer while undergoing cancer treatments. It has been reported that the chondrosarcoma diagnosis and subsequent story arc of the character Dr. Catherine Avery, played by Debbie Allen, was inspired by Finch's supposed medical history.

== Controversy ==
Throughout her time working in the writers' room at Grey's Anatomy, Finch wrote a series of essays about her personal medical struggles in publications including Elle, The Hollywood Reporter, and Shondaland. In these articles, she shared stories about her purported diagnosis with chondrosarcoma (a rare bone cancer), having an abortion while undergoing chemotherapy, losing a kidney, and undergoing a knee replacement due to misdiagnosis. Finch's medical history was never verified by any of the publications and she confessed to her then-wife Jennifer Beyer that none of these stories was true when Beyer confronted her over some inconsistencies.

Finch had altered her appearance to appear sick while working on Grey's Anatomy and used stories about her medical diagnoses to gain accommodations at work, including deadline extensions and periods of absence. Finch also reportedly made allegations that her brother abused her as a child, that he died by suicide, and that she cleaned up the remains of a friend who was killed in the Tree of Life synagogue mass shooting.

In March 2022, it was reported that Disney, a Shondaland affiliate at the time, had opened an investigation into Finch's falsehoods. The investigation was prompted when Beyer contacted Disney and Shondaland with information that she had uncovered about Finch's past. During Disney's investigation, Finch refused to provide medical documentation or undergo an independent medical evaluation to substantiate her claims, and she was subsequently placed on administrative leave on March 17, 2022. Finch formally resigned shortly after and the investigation ended.

In December 2022, Finch released a formal statement confessing that she never had cancer. Finch also admitted that her brother had not died by suicide and is currently living in Florida.

In October 2024, Peacock released Anatomy of Lies, a three-part docuseries about Finch's career and controversy.
