= Tony Phelan =

American television director, producer and writer

Tony Phelan is an American television screenwriter, producer and director. He is married to television producer and screenwriter Joan Rater.

Phelan is best known for his work on ABC's Grey's Anatomy, for which he has been nominated for two Emmys and three WGA awards, winning one shared with the show's writing team. On Grey's Anatomy, he produced over two dozen episodes, wrote five and served as co-executive producer for another eighteen. His wife also works on the show, which they joined at the beginning of the second season. Together, they became executive producers and ran the writers room alongside show creator Shonda Rhimes. They left the show after the tenth season ended sealing a two-year deal with CBS Television Studios. While at CBS, under their production company Midwest Livestock, the pair created the legal drama Doubt which lasted one season. They then signed an overall deal with NBC/Universal and created the family drama Council of Dads which ran for 13 episodes.

Most recently, Phelan and Rater created the critically acclaimed historical limited series A Small Light for NatGeo and Disney+. This story of Miep Gies who helped hide the Frank family in Amsterdam during World War II won the Humanitas Prize in Limited Series; the Gotham Award for Best Breakthrough Series; and the Television Academy Honors for a drama series that creates awareness, enlightens, educates and/or positively motivates audiences.

They are also the creators and executive producers of Fire Country on CBS, and Sheriff Country which premieres Fall 2025.

Phelan got his start as a TV director on Grey's Anatomy, eventually directing multiple episodes including the musical episode. He later directed episodes of Madam Secretary, Doubt, Council of Dads and A Small Light.

His other work includes producing and writing for Madam Secretary Law & Order: Trial by Jury, and writing for the programs Push, Nevada, Threat Matrix, MDs, Haunting Sarah, Fling, and Cover Me.
