= We Didn't Start the Fire (Grey's Anatomy) =

- Grey's Anatomy episode
- Episode no.: Season 15; Episode 15
- Directed by: Chandra Wilson
- Written by: Andy Reaser
- Original air date: February 28, 2019

Guest appearances
- Debbie Allen as Dr. Catherine Fox; Jason George as Dr. Ben Warren; Greg Germann as Dr. Thomas Koracick; Lindsay Wagner as Helen Karev; Kyle Secor as John Dickinson; Stefania Spampinato as Dr. Carina DeLuca; Peyton Kennedy as Betty Nelson; Lorenzo Caccialianza as Dr. Vincenzo DeLuca; Jaicy Elliot as Dr. Taryn Helm; Jennifer Grey as Carol Dickinson

Episode chronology
← Previous "I Want a New Drug"	Next → "Blood and Water"
- Grey's Anatomy season 15

"We Didn't Start the Fire" is the fifteenth episode of the fifteenth season of the American medical drama television series Grey's Anatomy, and the 332nd episode overall. Written by Andy Reaser and directed by cast member Chandra Wilson, the episode aired on the American Broadcasting Company (ABC) in the United States on February 28, 2019.

The episode focuses on the Grey Sloan Memorial staff as they attend a party to celebrate Catherine Fox's (Debbie Allen) successful surgery. Meredith Grey (Ellen Pompeo) navigates the public revelation of her evolving relationship with Andrew DeLuca (Giacomo Gianniotti), while Jackson Avery (Jesse Williams) grapples with growing distance from Maggie Pierce (Kelly McCreary). Meanwhile, Amelia Shepherd (Caterina Scorsone) and Owen Hunt (Kevin McKidd) confront unresolved jealousy and emotional challenges. Alex Karev (Justin Chambers) is unsettled by an unexpected visit from his mother, Helen Karev (Lindsay Wagner), and Betty’s (Peyton Kennedy) parents face a tough decision about the custody of her child.

Although the episode was fictionally set in Seattle, Washington, filming occurred in Los Angeles, California. The title of the episode refers to the song "We Didn't Start the Fire" by Billy Joel. It officially made Grey's Anatomy the longest-running American primetime medical drama series, surpassing ER (1994–2009).

Upon its initial broadcast, "We Didn't Start the Fire" was watched by 6.99 million viewers in the United States, receiving a 1.6/8 Nielsen rating in the 18–49 demographic. It ranked #7 in the Top 25 primetime broadcast shows in the key demographic and #16 in overall viewership, becoming the most-watched drama series of the week. The episode received mixed-to-positive reviews from television critics, with praise for Wilson's direction and the performances of Pompeo and McKidd.

== Plot ==
The episode opens with a voice-over narration from Meredith Grey (Ellen Pompeo), reflecting on the balance between self-reflection and celebrating achievements, emphasizing the need to recognize successes amid inevitable challenges.

The doctors of Grey Sloan throw a party at Jackson Avery's (Jesse Williams) house to celebrate Amelia Shepherd (Caterina Scorsone) and Tom Koracick's (Greg Germann) successful surgery on Catherine Fox (Debbie Allen). Meanwhile, Alex Karev (Justin Chambers) and Jo Wilson (Camilla Luddington) grow concerned when Alex’s mother, Helen (Lindsay Wagner), arrives unexpectedly. Amelia and Owen Hunt (Kevin McKidd) struggle emotionally after saying goodbye to Betty (Peyton Kennedy) and Leo, putting them in a sour mood for the party.

Meredith reveals to Alex that she is dating Andrew DeLuca (Giacomo Gianniotti), and their relationship becomes public when Richard Webber (James Pickens Jr.) catches them kissing in Jackson’s guest room. Maggie Pierce (Kelly McCreary) is frustrated over an article about her surgery, and Jackson becomes impatient when Catherine fails to attend the party after going out drinking with Miranda Bailey (Chandra Wilson).

Owen spends the night sulking over Teddy Altman (Kim Raver) and Koracick's relationship, leading to Amelia ending things with him. Koracick later punches Owen after an insensitive comment, and the party is cut short when the fire alarm goes off. After the party, Betty’s parents return Leo to Owen and Amelia, believing they are better suited to raise him. Meanwhile, Carina DeLuca (Stefania Spampinato) interrupts Andrew and Meredith at his apartment with the arrival of their estranged father, Vincenzo (Lorenzo Caccialianza).

== Production ==
This episode was written by Andy Reaser and directed by starring cast member Chandra Wilson. It marks a significant milestone as Grey's Anatomy officially becomes the longest-running American primetime medical drama series, surpassing ER, which concluded on April 2, 2009.

== Release ==
"We Didn't Start the Fire" was originally broadcast on February 28, 2019, in the United States on the American Broadcasting Company (ABC). The episode was watched by 6.99 million viewers, an increase from the previous episode's 6.89 million. In the key 18-49 demographic, it earned a 1.6/8 rating/share, down slightly from the prior episode. The episode ranked 7th in the Top 25 primetime broadcast shows for adults 18-49 and 16th in overall viewership, becoming the most-watched drama series of the week.
