= Joan Rater =

American screenwriter

Joan Rater is an American television producer and screenwriter. Her most notable work has been for the medical drama Grey's Anatomy, for which she has served as writer, producer and supervising producer for over fifty separate episodes. She is married to Tony Phelan who also works on the show.

She has been nominated, along with the rest of the Grey's Anatomy crew, for two Emmys in 2006 and 2007, both for "Outstanding Drama Series". Also for the Grey's Anatomy crew, she has won one Writers Guild of America Award for "New Series" in 2006, and has been nominated for two others in 2006 and 2007, both for "Dramatic Series". She and her husband joined the show at the beginning of the second season. They have since become executive producers and run the writers room with show creator Shonda Rhimes. They will leave the show after the tenth season has ended as they have sealed a two-year deal with CBS Television Studios.

Apart from her Grey's Anatomy producing and directorial work, she has worked mainly as a writer on television series including Law & Order: Trial by Jury, Fling, Threat Matrix, MDs and Push, Nevada. She has also produced for Law & Order: Trial by Jury and served as executive story editor on Threat Matrix and 10-8: Officers on Duty.
