= List of Grey's Anatomy cast members =

The original cast of Grey's Anatomy utilized a racially diverse casting process.

Grey's Anatomy is an American television medical drama that debuted on the American Broadcasting Company (ABC), as a mid-season replacement for Boston Legal on March 27, 2005. While creating the show, producers emphasized the casting process. The series has aired for twenty-two seasons, and focuses on the fictional lives of surgical interns and residents, as they gradually evolve into seasoned doctors, while trying to maintain personal lives. The show's premise originated with Shonda Rhimes, who serves as an executive producer, along with Betsy Beers, Mark Gordon, Krista Vernoff, Rob Corn, Mark Wilding, and Allan Heinberg. It is primarily filmed in Los Angeles, California. The series was created to be racially diverse, utilizing a color-blind casting technique. All roles for the series are cast without the characters' races being pre-specified, in keeping with Rhimes' vision of diversity.

The series' protagonist, Meredith Grey, is portrayed by Ellen Pompeo. Pompeo starred in the leading role in Moonlight Mile, which led to her being cast as Meredith. Meredith is assigned to work under Miranda Bailey, the only character developed with a racial description in mind, who is portrayed by Chandra Wilson. On Wilson's addition to the cast Rhimes reported, "[Wilson] is exactly who Miranda is." The other interns working with Meredith under Bailey are Cristina Yang, George O'Malley, Izzie Stevens, and Alex Karev played by Sandra Oh, T.R. Knight, Katherine Heigl and Justin Chambers respectively. Chambers' character was not originally part of the pilot but was added later as the fifth and final intern. Oh was initially brought to play the character of Bailey, but she was pressed to read for the role of Cristina instead at the audition. Many actors read for the role of Dr. Derek Shepherd including Isaiah Washington, but when Patrick Dempsey read for the part, "he was just perfect", according to Rhimes. Washington was cast as Burke because the original actor to play Burke had to withdraw.

The second season marked the introduction of Eric Dane as leading plastic surgeon Dr. Mark Sloan and Sara Ramirez as ortho-resident Dr. Callie Torres. They were initially cast as recurring characters, but both were given star billing at the opening of the third season. Ramirez was cast after ABC executives offered them a role in the network show of their choice, Dane had previously auditioned unsuccessfully for a role in the pilot episode. Kate Walsh also joined the show in season two, after making a guest appearance in season one as Dr. Addison Montgomery, the estranged wife of Derek, and leaves the show at the end of the third, to launch her own spin-off medical drama Private Practice. Burke departs after the third season, and is replaced by Erica Hahn, played by Brooke Smith, who leaves the show during the fifth. Chyler Leigh first appears in the third as the half-sister of Meredith, Lexie Grey. Kevin McKidd playing Dr. Owen Hunt was signed as a series regular after originally being cast for a specific story arc joins the cast in season 5. Jessica Capshaw is given series regular status at the beginning of the sixth season after playing peds-attending Arizona Robbins in season 5.

Following O'Malley's death and Stevens' departure, Jesse Williams and Sarah Drew joined the cast as new residents from Mercy West Jackson Avery and April Kepner both having made their series debuts as recurring characters in the sixth season. Kim Raver, who was cast as recurring character Dr. Teddy Altman in the sixth season, was given star billing later in the season. In the tenth season, the new batch of interns introduced during the ninth season were made series regulars including Camilla Luddington as Dr. Jo Wilson, Gaius Charles as Dr. Shane Ross, Jerrika Hinton as Dr. Stephanie Edwards, Tessa Ferrer as Dr. Leah Murphy except Tina Majorino as Dr. Heather Brooks (who died during the second episode of the tenth season. Caterina Scorsone was upgraded to a series regular to continue her role as Dr. Amelia Shepherd, one of Dr. Derek Shepherd's four sisters. Scorsone guest-starred as Dr. Amelia Shepherd in the seventh and eighth seasons and was a main character on Private Practice. Kelly McCreary as Dr. Maggie Pierce was promoted to a series regular after being credited as guest-starring until the eleventh episode of the eleventh season. In Season 11 Geena Davis becomes a reoccurring guest star as Dr. Nicole Herman and occurs again in Season 14 as a guest star.

Season 19 featured five new interns: Dr. Simone Griffith (Alexis Floyd), Dr. Mika Yasuda (Midori Francis), Dr. Benson "Blue" Kwan (Harry Shum Jr.), Dr. Jules Millin (Adelaide Kane), and Dr. Lucas Adams (Niko Terho), the latter of whom is revealed to be a nephew of Amelia and Derek Shepherd. As Griffith, Kwan, Millin and Adams enter their second year, with Yasuda having departed the show in season 21, season 22 introduces a new intern, Dr. Wes Bryant (Trevor Jackson), following his guest appearance in Season 21.

The cast has received numerous awards and nominations, including a Screen Actors Guild Award for Outstanding Performance by an Ensemble in a Drama Series, a Golden Globe Award for Best Television Series – Drama, and numerous Primetime Emmy Award nominations for individual cast members.

== Cast ==
=== Main ===
List indicator

This section includes characters who have appeared in the series as credited cast.

- An empty grey cell indicates the character was not in the season.

Legend
= Main cast (credited)
= Recurring cast (3+)
= Guest cast (1–2)

Actor	Character	Seasons																						
Actor	Character	1	2	3	4	5	6	7	8	9	10	11	12	13	14	15	16	17	18	19	20	21	22	23
Ellen Pompeo	Meredith Grey	M (Note: Ellen Pompeo makes her last regular appearance in 19x07. She continues to narrate most episodes and appears sporadically in the following episodes and subsequent seasons. Pompeo continues to receive top billing in any episodes in which she appears and/or provides narration for.)	M	M	M	M	M	M	M	M	M	M	M	M	M	M	M	M	M	M	M	M	M	M
Sandra Oh	Cristina Yang	M	M	M	M	M	M	M	M	M	M													
Katherine Heigl	Izzie Stevens	M (Note: Katherine Heigl makes her final appearance in 6x12 but is credited through 6x18.)	M	M	M	M	M																	
Justin Chambers	Alex Karev	M	M	M	M	M	M	M	M	M	M	M	M	M	M	M	M							
T. R. Knight	George O'Malley	M	M	M	M	M												G						
Chandra Wilson	Miranda Bailey	M	M	M	M	M	M	M	M	M	M	M	M	M	M	M	M	M	M	M	M	M	M	M
James Pickens Jr.	Richard Webber	M	M	M	M	M	M	M	M	M	M	M	M	M	M	M	M	M	M	M	M	M	M	M
Isaiah Washington	Preston Burke	M	M	M							G													
Patrick Dempsey	Derek Shepherd	M	M	M	M	M	M	M	M	M	M	M						R (Note: Patrick Dempsey is credited as a guest star for his appearances with the exception of 17x13, where he is credited as a special guest star.)						
Kate Walsh	Addison Montgomery	G (Note: Kate Walsh was originally set to appear as a recurring character in six episodes of the first season. However, after the season was cut short, Walsh's remaining five appearances aired in the second season before she was promoted to the main cast in what would have been the second episode of season two.)	M (Note: Kate Walsh is initially credited as a special guest star in season two before being promoted to main cast in 2x07.)	M	SG	SG	SG	SG	SG										R (Note: Kate Walsh is credited as a special guest star in a recurring capacity.)	R			SG	
Sara Ramirez	Callie Torres		R	M	M	M	M	M	M	M	M	M	M											
Eric Dane	Mark Sloan		G	M (Note: Eric Dane is credited as a series regular from 3x03 through 9x02. In 3x02 he is uncredited.)	M	M	M	M	M	M								SG						
Chyler Leigh	Lexie Grey			G	M	M	M	M	M									SG						
Brooke Smith	Erica Hahn		R	G	M (Note: Brooke Smith is the only series regular to not hold the role for a full season. She was credited as a series regular from 4x05 to 5x07)	M																		
Kevin McKidd	Owen Hunt					M (Note: Kevin McKidd is initially credited as a guest star in season five before being promoted to main cast in 5x14.)	M	M	M	M	M	M	M	M	M	M	M	M	M	M	M	M	M	
Jessica Capshaw	Arizona Robbins					R	M	M	M	M	M	M	M	M	M						G			
Kim Raver	Teddy Altman						M (Note: Kim Raver is initially credited as guest star in season six before being promoted to main cast in 6x19.)	M	M						R	M	M	M	M	M	M	M	M	
Sarah Drew	April Kepner						R	M	M	M	M	M	M	M	M			G	G					
Jesse Williams	Jackson Avery						R	M	M	M	M	M	M	M	M	M	M	M	G	G		G	G	
Camilla Luddington	Jo Wilson									R	M	M	M	M	M	M	M	M	M	M	M	M	M	M
Gaius Charles	Shane Ross									R	M													
Jerrika Hinton	Stephanie Edwards									R	M	M	M	M										
Tessa Ferrer	Leah Murphy									R	M			R										
Caterina Scorsone	Amelia Shepherd							G	SG		R	M	M	M	M	M	M	M	M	M	M	M	M	M
Kelly McCreary	Maggie Pierce										G	M (Note: Kelly McCreary is initially credited as a guest star in season eleven before being promoted to main cast in 11x11.)	M	M	M	M	M	M	M	M	G		G	
Jason George	Ben Warren						R	G	R	R	R	R	M	M	M	R	R	R	R	R	R	M	M	M
Martin Henderson	Nathan Riggs												M	M	M									
Giacomo Gianniotti	Andrew DeLuca											G	M (Note: Giacomo Gianniotti is initially credited as a guest star in season twelve before being promoted to main cast in 12x10.)	M	M	M	M	M						
Greg Germann	Tom Koracick														R	R	M	M	G	G		G		
Jake Borelli	Levi Schmitt														R (Note: Jake Borelli is initially credited as a co-star in recurring capacity before being upgraded to a guest star in season fifteen.)	R	M (Note: Borelli and Francis exited as series regulars in season twenty-one, but were still billed as starring until 21x08, with Borelli returning for one episode later on that season.)	M	M	M	M	M		
Chris Carmack	Atticus Lincoln															R	M	M	M	M	M	M	M	M
Richard Flood	Cormac Hayes																R	M	M					
Anthony Hill	Winston Ndugu																G	M	M	M	M	M	M	M
Scott Speedman	Nick Marsh														G				M	M	R	R	R	R
Alexis Floyd	Simone Griffith																			M	M	M	M	M
Harry Shum Jr.	Benson Kwan																			M	M	M	M	M
Adelaide Kane	Jules Millin																			M	M	M	M	M
Midori Francis	Mika Yasuda																			M	M	M		
Niko Terho	Lucas Adams																			M	M	M	M	M
Trevor Jackson	Wes Bryant																					G	M	M

=== Recurring ===
Actor	Character	Seasons																						
Actor	Character	1	2	3	4	5	6	7	8	9	10	11	12	13	14	15	16	17	18	19	20	21	22	23
Kathy C. "BokHee" An	BokHee	R (Note: Despite being part of the recurring cast in all of the show's seasons, Kathy C. An is credited in only five episodes in the entire show, namely 15x14, 15x15, 16x21, 17x08 and 18x18.)	R	R	R	R	R	R	R	R	R	R	R	R	R	R	R	R	R	R	R	R	R	R
Kate Burton	Ellis Grey	R	R	R			G (Note: Portrayed by Sarah Paulson.)		G			R			G	R			R	G			G	
Linda Klein	Nurse Linda	R	R	R	G	G	G	G	R	G	G	G	G	G	R	G	G	G	G					
Anjul Nigam	Raj Sen	G	R		G									G										
Sarah Utterback	Olivia Harper	R	R	R	G		G								G									
Moe Irvin	Tyler Christian	R	R	R	R	G	R	G			G													
John O'Brien	Jeffrey	R	R	G	G		G	G		G							R							
Noelle McCutchen	Nurse Vivian	R	R																					
Robin Pearson Rose	Patricia Murphy	G	R	G		G											G							
Steven W. Bailey	Anesthesiologist Jeremy	R																						
Steven W. Bailey	Joe		R	R		R	R	G																
Loretta Devine	Adele Webber		R	R	R	G	G	R	R	G														
Kate Anthony	Nurse Kate		R	R	G	R	R																	
Jeffrey Dean Morgan	Denny Duquette		R	R		R																		
Chris O'Donnell	Finn Dandridge		R	R																				
Ray Ford	Ray Sutera		R	G	R	R		G							G		G							
Various	William "Tuck" George Bailey Jones		R		R	G	G	G	G	G	G													
BJ Tanner	William "Tuck" George Bailey Jones													G	G	G	G	G						
Cress Williams	Tucker Jones		R		R																			
Cathy Lind Hayes	Debbie		R																					
Jeff Perry	Thatcher Grey		G	R	G	G	R (Note: Portrayed by John Ainsworth in 6x15.)	G								G								
Kali Rocha	Sydney Heron		G	R	G																	R		
George Dzundza	Harold O'Malley		G	R																				
Tim Griffin	Ronny O'Malley		G	R																				
Jack J. Yang	Walter		G	R																				
Greg Pitts	Jerry O'Malley		G	R																				
Mare Winningham	Susan Grey		G	R																				
Diahann Carroll	Jane Burke			R	G																			
Debra Monk	Louise O'Malley			R	G		G		G															
Roger Rees	Colin Marlow			R																				
Mitch Pileggi	Lawrence Jennings			G			R		G															
Nicole Rubio	Nicole Cummins			G	G	R	R	G	R	R	R	R	G		G									
Elizabeth Reaser	Rebecca "Ava" Pope			R	R																			
Candice Afia	Laura			G	R	R	G																	
Mark Saul	Steve Mostow				R	R	R	G	G															
Molly Kidder	Megan Nowland				R	R	R																	
Gloria Garayua	Graciella Guzman				R	R	R																	
Joseph Williamson	Pierce Halley				R	R	G																	
Winston Story	Leo Byrider				R	R	G																	
Amrapali Ambegaokar	Dani Mandvi				R	R	G																	
Tymberlee Chanel	Claire				R	R	G																	
Amy Madigan	Katharine Wyatt				R	G	G																	
Joy Osmanski	Lucy				R	G																		
Lauren Stamile	Rose				R	G																		
Richard Keith	Mitch				R																			
Edward Herrmann	Norman Shales				R																			
Payton Silver	Dr. Knox					R	R	R	R	R	G	G	G	R	G	R	R	R	R	G				
Brandon Scott	Ryan Spalding					R	G																	
Melissa George	Sadie Harris					R																		
Mary McDonnell	Virginia Dixon					R																		
Eric Stoltz	William Dunn					R																		
Samantha Mathis	Melinda Prescott					R																		
Aaron Refvem	Jackson Prescott					R																		
Jennifer Westfeldt	Jen Harmon					R																		
Ben Shenkman	Rob Harmon					R																		
Kimberly Elise	Rebecca Swender					R																		
Robert Baker	Charles Percy						R		G				G											
Michael O'Neill	Gary Clark						R																	
Leven Rambin	Sloan Riley						R																	
Nora Zehetner	Reed Adamson						R																	
Scott Foley	Henry Burton							R	R															
Daniel Sunjata	Eli Lloyd							R	G															
James Tupper	Andrew Perkins							R																
Peter MacNicol	Robert Stark							R																
Rachael Taylor	Lucy Fields							R																
Janora McDuffie	Janet Meyers							G	R															
Eva Ariel Binder	Sofia Robbins Sloan Torres							R	R	R	R	G	R		R									
Jela K. Moore	Zola Grey Shepherd							R	R	R	R	R												
Aniela Gumbs	Zola Grey Shepherd											R	R	R	R	R	R	R	R	R	R	R	R	
Debbie Allen	Catherine Fox								R	R	R	R	R	R	R	R	R	R	R	R	R	R	R	R
Holley Fain	Julia Canner								R	G														
Jon Schmidt	Logan								R															
Amanda Fuller	Morgan Peterson								R															
William Daniels	Craig Thomas								G	R														
Justin Bruening	Matthew Taylor									R	R				R									
Dominic Hoffman	Jeff Russell									R	G													
Tina Majorino	Heather Brooks									R	G													
Steven Culp	Darren Parker									R														
Meeghan Holaway	Doctor's Rep									R														
Roma Maffia	Roberta Thompson									R														
Constance Zimmer	Alana Cahill									R														
Hilarie Burton	Lauren Boswell									R														
Charles Michael Davis	Jason Myers									R														
Enid Graham	Rachel Dawson									R														
Michael Buie	Paul Dawson									R														
Kyle Red Silverstein	Ethan Dawson									R														
Jennifer Bassey	Nancy Dawson									R														
Rebecca Field	Sabine McNeil										R	G												
Billy Malone	Jon McNeil										R	G												
James Remar	Jimmy Evans										R													
Melissa Center	Ashley Glazier										R													
JD Cullum	Lloyd										R													
Mark Adair-Rios	David Morris										R													
Bresha Webb	Teresa Morris										R													
Jadin Gould	Ivy McNeil										R													
Armani Jackson	Braden Morris										R													
Harley Graham	Francesca McNeil										R													
Thomas Barbusca	Link McNeil										R													
Marguerite Moreau	Emma Marling										R													
Geena Davis	Nicole Herman											R			G									
Nick D'Agosto	Graham Maddox											R												
Joe Adler	Isaac Cross											G	R	R										
Joe Dinicol	Mitchell Spencer											G	R											
Samantha Sloyan	Penny Blake											G	R											
Vivian Nixon	Hannah Brody												R	R	G	G	R							
Scott Elrod	William Thorpe												R											
Wilmer Valderrama	Kyle Diaz												R											
Mavrick and Brassix Orion	Harriet Kepner-Avery												G	R	R	G								
Penelope Kapudija	Harriet Kepner-Avery																	G	G					
LaTanya Richardson	Diane Pierce													R					G	G				
Marika Dominczyk	Eliza Minnick													R										
Abigail Spencer	Megan Hunt													G (Note: Portrayed by Bridget Regan in 13x08 and a stand-in in 13x24.)	R	G			R					
Matthew Morrison	Paul Stadler													G	R									
Jaicy Elliot	Taryn Helm														R	R	R	R	R	R	R	R	R	
Stefania Spampinato	Carina DeLuca-Bishop														R	R	R	R	R	R	G			
Sophia Ali	Dahlia Qadri														R	R	R							
Alex Blue Davis	Casey Parker														R	R	R							
Peyton Kennedy	Betty Nelson														R	R								
Rushi Kota	Vikram Roy														R	G								
Jeanine Mason	Sam Bello														R									
Bethany Joy Lenz	Jenny														R									
Blake Hood	Clive Johnson														R									
Lesley Boone	Judy Kemp														R									
Nayah Damasen	Kimmie Park														R									
Candis Cayne	Michelle Velez														R									
Rachel Ticotin	Marie Cerone														R									
Jaina Lee Ortiz	Andy Herrera														G	R			G	G				
Lindsay Wagner	Helen Karev														G	R								
Alex Landi	Nico Kim															R	R	R	R		G			
Caroline Clay	Cece Colvin															R								
Jennifer Grey	Carol Dinkinson															R								
Kyle Secor	John Dinkinson															R								
Jasmine Guy	Gemma Larson															G	R							
Barrett Doss	Victoria Hughes																R	G	G	G				
Devin Way	Blake Simms																R							
Cleo King	Robin																R							
Devika Parikh	Nancy Klein																R							
Sarah Rafferty	Suzanne																R							
Lindy Booth	Hadley																R							
Shoshannah Stern	Lauren Riley																R							
Zaiver Sinnett	Zander Perez																G	R	R					
Melissa DuPrey	Sara Ortiz																	R	R					
Robert I. Mesa	James Chee																	R	R					
Mackenzie Marsh	Val Ashton																	R						
Lisa Vidal	Alma Ortiz																	R						
Nikhil Shukla	Reza Khan																	R						
E.R. Fightmaster	Kai Bartley																		R	R				
Bardia Seiri	Farouk Shami Hunt														G				R					
Sylvia Kwan	Mabel Tseng																		R					
Peter Gallagher	David Hamilton																		R					
Lynn Chen	Michelle Lin																		R					
Greg Tarzan Davis	Jordan Wright																		R					
Skylar Astin	Todd Eames																		R					
Rome Flynn	Wendell Ndugu																		R					
Bianca A. Santos	Kristen Clark																		R					
Cedric Sanders	Simon Clark																		R					
Juliet Mills	Maxine Anderson																			R	G			
William Martinez	Trey Delgado																			R				
Marla Gibbs	Joyce Ward																			R	G			
Sam Page	Sam Sutton																			R				
Natalie Morales	Monica Beltran																				R	R	G	
Freddy Miyares	Dorian Cardenas																				R			
Jacqueline Obradors	Valeria Cardenas																				R			
Sophia Bush	Cass Beckman																					R	R	
Floriana Lima	Nora Young																					R	R	
Dianne Doan	Molly Tran																				G	R		
Jade Pettyjohn	Dani Spencer																						R	R
Jen Landon	Toni Wright																						R	R
Anita Kalathara	Kavita Mohanty																						R	
James Wolk	Seth Norton																							R
Sarah Levy	Corrie																							R

=== Minor characters ===
==== Season 1 ====
- Ahn, portrayed by Scarlett Lam
- Allison, portrayed by Alex Thayer
- Athena, portrayed by Ever Carradine
- Bill Adams, portrayed by Wayne Wilderson
- Mr. Bryce, portrayed by Randall Arney
- Mrs. Bryce, portrayed by Robbie Troy
- Holly Adams, portrayed by Wendy Davis
- Katie Bryce, portrayed by Skyler Shaye
- Louis Cardon, portrayed by Gary Kraus

==== Season 2 ====
- Agnes, portrayed by June Lockhart
- Alice Bickham, portrayed by Pamela Roylance
- Amelia Carver, portrayed by Emilee Wallace
- Amir, portrayed by Ricardo Molina
- Amy, portrayed by Ann Cusack
- Anne, portrayed by Teddi Siddall
- Audrey, portrayed by Lauren Tom
- Beatrice Carver, portrayed by Laurie Metcalf
- Brad Ackles, portrayed by Ken Marino
- Brian, portrayed by Charles Duckworth
- Brooke Blanchard, portrayed by Michelle Arthur
- Mr. Burton, portrayed by David Grant Wright
- Mrs. Burton, portrayed by Deborah Geffner
- Chaz, portrayed by Toby Meuli
- Grace Bickham, portrayed by Dona Hardy
- Jake Burton, portrayed by Jesse Plemons
- James Carlson, portrayed by John Bishop
- Kyle Booker, portrayed by Tim Edward Rhoze
- Lou Bradley, portrayed by Sean Moran
- Michael Beglight, portrayed by Matt Roth
- Mindy Carlson, portrayed by Jillian Armenante
- Pamela Calva, portrayed by Arlene Tur
- Rick Beglight, portrayed by Jonathan Slavin
- Shawn Beglight, portrayed by Noah Gray-Cabey
- Sylvia Booker, portrayed by Natalie Cole
- Verna Bradley, portrayed by Mimi Kennedy
- Mr. Calva, portrayed by Carlos Cervantes

==== Season 3 ====
- Anna, portrayed by Annie Campbell
- Carol, portrayed by Stephanie Niznik
- Donald Burke, portrayed by Richard Roundtree
- Estelle Byrd, portrayed by Francesca P. Roberts
- Helena Boye, portrayed by Chryssie Whitehead
- Jamie Carr, portrayed by Alexandra Holden
- Jeff Bloom, portrayed by Jeff Rubino
- Maya Bennett, portrayed by Shavon Kirksey
- Naomi Bennett, portrayed by Merrin Dungey; Audra McDonald
- Pruitt Byrd
- Rebecca Bloom, portrayed by Tina Holmes
- Sam Bennett, portrayed by Taye Diggs
- Steve Beck, portrayed by Joe Holt
- Ted Carr, portrayed by Jim Parrack

==== Season 4 ====
- Ariana, portrayed by Courtney Hope
- Mr. Arnold, portrayed by Cullen Douglas
- Andre Barrett, portrayed by Jeffrey D. Sams
- Brian, portrayed by Braeden Lemasters
- Elizabeth Archer, portrayed by Glenne Headley
- Gretchen Bitzer, portrayed by Miriam Flynn
- Hunter Chapman, portrayed by Martin Spanjers
- Keisha Brotherton
- Leo Byrider, portrayed by Winston Story
- Mary Chapman, portrayed by Eve Gordon
- Sean Brotherton, portrayed by Rockmond Dunbar
- Teresa Brotherton, portrayed by Enuka Okuma

==== Season 5 ====
- Amanda, portrayed by Shannon Lucio
- Mr. Anderson, portrayed by Larkin Campbell
- Mrs. Anderson, portrayed by Perry Smith
- Mrs. Borsokowski, portrayed by Carol Ann Susi
- Recruiting Clerk Brewton, portrayed by Brock Cuchna
- Clay Bedonie, portrayed by August Schellenberg
- Ed Bullard, portrayed by George Coe
- Emma Anderson, portrayed by Kay Panabaker
- Holly Anderson, portrayed by Christa B. Allen
- Kate Carlson, portrayed by Nina Siemaszko
- Maddy Carlson, portrayed by Destiny Whitlock
- Margaret Campbell, portrayed by Faye Dunaway
- Michael Breyers, portrayed by John Getz
- Michelle Begler, portrayed by Sheila Shaw
- Mike Carlson
- Pat Begler, portrayed by Chet Grissom
- Randy Begler, portrayed by Scott Haven
- Rosemary Bullard, portrayed by Bonnie Bartlett
- Ruth Begler, portrayed by Lauri Johnson
- Sarabeth Brewers, portrayed by Bernadette Peters
- Shelly Boden, portrayed by Samantha Quan
- Tori Begler, portrayed by Adair Tishler

==== Season 6 ====
- Angela, portrayed by Kristen Ariza
- Mr. Becker, portrayed by Jon Bradford
- Bethany Anderson, portrayed by Erica Gimpel
- Corporal Burnett, portrayed by Seth McLaughlin
- Casey, portrayed by Mason Cook
- Cathy Becker, portrayed by Erinn Hayes
- Danny Becker, portrayed by Andrew & Jakob Miller
- Hillary Boyd, portrayed by Alanna Masterman
- Jamie Anders, portrayed by Abigail McFarlane
- Jill Boyd, portrayed by Nealla Gordon
- Kim Allen, portrayed by Sara Gilbert
- Nicole Baylow, portrayed by Missi Pyle
- Paul Anderson, portrayed by Derek Webster
- Ruthie Carlin, portrayed by Cynthia Stevenson
- Sean Allen, portrayed by Derek Cecil
- Sunder Atluri, portrayed by Ravi Kapoor
- Trey Boyd, portrayed by Angelo Tiffe
- Wallace Anderson, portrayed by Khamani Griffin
- William Bailey, portrayed by Frankie Faison
- Mrs. Banks, portrayed by Pamela Reed

==== Season 7 ====
- Aasif, portrayed by Omid Abtahi
- Abena, portrayed by Anehita Okojie
- Allison Baker, portrayed by Nancy Travis
- Annette Aranda, portrayed by Toni Torres
- Asha, portrayed by Nina Monet Hudson
- Ben, portrayed by Hugh Holub
- Paramedic Brett, portrayed by Brett Glazer
- Nurse Carol, portrayed by Rachel Andersen
- Donna Bevell, portrayed by Judy Prescott
- Ed Beckert, portrayed by Newell Alexander
- Greg Bevell, portrayed by Matthew Fahey
- Howard Baker, portrayed by Michael Beach
- Jared Cassidy, portrayed by Mark Fite
- Jerry Adams, portrayed by Art Chudabala
- Kyle Baker, portrayed by Sage Ryan
- Miguel Aranda, portrayed by Anthony Keyvan
- Raul Aranda, portrayed by Wilmer Calderon
- Sarah Cassidy, portrayed by Amanda Leighton
- Sonya Amin, portrayed by Marina Sirtis
- Sophia Cassidy, portrayed by Tracey Maddox
- Tarik Amin, portrayed by Paj Vahdat
- Tess Adams, portrayed by Jolene Kim

==== Season 8 ====
- Abby Anderson, portrayed by Saige Ryan Campbell
- Allan, portrayed by Vincent Angelo
- Grandma Anderson, portrayed by Evelyn Reese
- Mr. Bosson, portrayed by Charles Emmett
- Mrs. Bosson, portrayed by Rosalyn Sidewater
- Judge Brentner, portrayed by Eamon Hunt
- Carter, portrayed by Matt Doherty
- Chad, portrayed by Robert Hoffman
- Charissa Baer, portrayed by Jamai Fisher
- Charlie Bilson, portrayed by John Pollono
- Cheryl Baer, portrayed by Judith Moreland
- Chuck Cain, portrayed by Lee Majors
- Emma Carroll, portrayed by Elizabeth Franz
- Janell Barnett, portrayed by Jordana Oberman
- Jessica Anderson
- Julia Canner, portrayed by Holley Fain
- Justine Campbell, portrayed by Alfre Woodard
- Kevin Banks, portrayed by Thad Luckinbill
- Lily Anderson, portrayed by Stella Maeve
- Lori Bosson, portrayed by Chelsea Harris
- Martin Carroll, portrayed by Rance Howard
- Michael Anderson, portrayed by Bridger Zadina
- Randy Barnett, portrayed by Nate Mooney
- Robert Anderson, portrayed by Dan Conroy
- Ruth Bennet, portrayed by Karly Rothenberg
- Angie, portrayed by Scout Taylor-Compton
- Dr. Atterman

==== Season 9 ====
- Adam, portrayed by Herbie Jackson
- Adad Al Asali, portrayed by Anthony Azizi
- Dr. Allen, portrayed by Brandon Ford Green
- Allie, portrayed by Catja Ojeda
- Amrita, portrayed by Nazanin Boniadi
- Andrew Carmichael, portrayed by Steve Kehela
- Andy, portrayed by Andrew Leeds
- Anne, portrayed by Francesca Ferrera
- Dr. Barrett, portrayed by Andi Margsahayam
- Social Worker Carol, portrayed by Misha Gonz-Cirkl
- Elena Bailey, portrayed by Bianca F. Taylor
- Emily Bennett, portrayed by Dale Dickey
- Joyce Basche, portrayed by Sarah Lily
- Mel Barnett, portrayed by Philip Casnoff
- Michael Baker, portrayed by Joe Nieves
- Steven Basche, portrayed by Lou Richards
- Vincent Blake, portrayed by Thom Barry
- Bobby Brinn, portrayed by William Edward Jennings
- Brenda, portrayed by Chelan Simmons
- Brie, portrayed by Elizabeth Anweis
- Brock, portrayed by Michael James Olsen
- Johnny Brinn, portrayed by Bryan Chesters
- Lillian Campion, portrayed by Helen Eigenberg
- Lisa Brinn, portrayed by Karla Droege
- Rich Campion, portrayed by Jordan Holland
- Ron Campion, portrayed by David Goryl

==== Season 10 ====
- Nurse Adam, portrayed by JB Tadena
- Nurse Anna, portrayed by JoAnna Rhambo
- Dr. Alma, portrayed by Illena Douglas
- Mrs. Amos, portrayed by Tacey Adams
- Anne, portrayed by Alyson Reed
- Ben Bosco, portrayed by Jere Burns
- Dr. Boyd, portrayed by Jeremy Cohenour
- Brian, portrayed by Bobby Campo
- Ms. Campbell
- Chelsea Ansell, portrayed by Amy Okuda
- Davis Calder, portrayed by Rick Gifford
- Elise Castor, portrayed by Anne Dudek
- Eric Block, portrayed by Paul James
- Jason Castor, portrayed by Charlie Hofheimer
- Jeremy Bennett, portrayed by Jeremy Rabb
- Joyce Bosco, portrayed by Annie Potts
- Lisa Campbell, portrayed by Lindsey Kraft
- Lydia Ashford, portrayed by Veronica Cartwright
- Maura Brooks, portrayed by Caryn West
- Rita Belmont, portrayed by Meghan Maureen McDonough
- Robert Bonocore, portrayed by Jason Boegh
- Samantha Calder, portrayed by Taja V. Simpson
- Tim Bowman, portrayed by Will Hawkes
- Victor Brown, portrayed by Eric Ladin

==== Season 11 ====
- AJ, portrayed by Shannon Brown
- Alana, portrayed by Allie Grant
- Ana, portrayed by Annet Mahendru
- Andrea, portrayed by Crista Flanagan
- Anna, portrayed by Jasmine Jessica Anthony
- Anne Chambers, portrayed by Elizabeth Ann Bennett
- Brenda Bonaman, portrayed by Deidra Edwards
- Brian, portrayed by Chad Buchanan
- Brian, portrayed by Rod Rowland
- Paramedic Calvin, portrayed by Terrence Edwards
- Caroline, portrayed by Daisy Lightfoot
- Charlie Abbott, portrayed by Robby Rasmussen
- Ethan Boyd, portrayed by Lance Gross
- Glenda Castillo, portrayed by Marla Sokoloff
- Howard Bonaman, portrayed by Rob Nagle
- Jordan Carter, portrayed by Michael Roark
- Lance Chambers, portrayed by Ryan P. Shrime
- Marcia Archibald, portrayed by Alexa Etchart
- Paul Castello, portrayed by Mike McColl
- Samuel Norbert Avery
- Thomas Archibald, portrayed by Jackson Hurst

==== Season 12 ====
- Abraham, portrayed by Lou Cutell
- Alice, portrayed by Alisha Soper
- Arvin, portrayed by Matthew Glen Johnson
- Astrid, portrayed by Jolene Kay
- Brian Carson, portrayed by Brett Zimmerman
- Casey, portrayed by Casey Sander
- Charlotte, portrayed by Nikki Deloach
- Hannah Brody, portrayed by Vivian Nixon
- Jade Bell, portrayed by Lindsay Kay Hayward
- Kamal Aboud, portrayed by Elisha Henig
- Loretta Brown, portrayed by Christine Kellogg-Darrin
- Michelle Carpio, portrayed by Gwendoline Yeo
- Rachel Bishop, portrayed by Jeanne Syquia
- Walter Carr, portrayed by Bill Smitovich

==== Season 13 ====
- Andrew Billings, portrayed by Don R. Williams
- Annie Banks, portrayed by Mary Wickliffe
- Bryan, portrayed by Luca Malacrino
- Candace, portrayed by Spencer Grammer
- Carl, portrayed by Paul Hayes
- Firefighter Carol, portrayed by Stephanie Czajkowski
- Carolyn Adkins, portrayed by Katherine Kirkpatrick
- Daniel Campbell, portrayed by Christopher Thornton
- Harry Adkins, portrayed by Joshua Bitton
- Lulu Calderwood, portrayed by Betty Murphy
- Polly Campbell, portrayed by Latarsha Rose
- Robert Avery, portrayed by Eric Roberts
- William Allen, portrayed by Maurice Hall
- Winnie Adkins, portrayed by Ruby Jay

==== Season 14 ====
- Bob, portrayed by Rubén Carfias
- Brett, portrayed by Dio Johnson
- Buck, portrayed by Steven Michael Eich
- Chad, portrayed by Santiago Segura
- Frankie Baker, portrayed by Micah Abbey
- Liz Brosniak, portrayed by Caitlin McGee
- Noah Brosniak, portrayed by Steele Gagnon
- Rachelle Baker, portrayed by China Shavers
- Tyler Burdeaux, portrayed by Brett Pierce

==== Season 15 ====
- Angela, portrayed by Isla Ferris
- Nurse Arlene, portrayed by Arlene Hogan
- Ava Krug, portrayed by Mashari Laila Bain
- Nurse Caroline, portrayed by Kathryn Taylor Smith
- Colin Anderson, portrayed by Riley Thomas Stewart
- Gus Carter, portrayed by Christian Ganiere
- Dave Buckley, portrayed by Mark L. Taylor
- Garrett Boland, portrayed by DeJuan Johnson
- Jim Blomquist, portrayed by Frank Gerrish
- Lori Carter, portrayed by Ali Hillis
- Scott Carter, portrayed by Greg Winter
- Seamus Anderson, portrayed by Billy Boyd

==== Season 16 ====
- Allison Robin Brown, portrayed by Sherri Saum
- Angie, portrayed by Shannon Chappell
- Ashley, portrayed by Katherine Cunningham
- Brett, portrayed by David Abed
- Brian, portrayed by Rich Ceraulo Ko
- Carla, portrayed by Ada Luz Pia
- Daya Burman, portrayed by Caroline Basu
- Elliott Calhoun, portrayed by Richard Jin
- Erin Banks / Cindy Wright, portrayed by Allie Doke
- Finley Calhoun, portrayed by Adriana DeGirolami
- Ian Adams, portrayed by Kailen Jude
- Jamie Caldwell, portrayed by Allyssa Amelia Entz
- Jasper Calhoun
- Matty Britland, portrayed by Ava DeVoe
- Maya Bishop, portrayed by Danielle Savre
- Mei Li Britland, portrayed by Mia Lynn Bangunan
- Rachel Burke, portrayed by Heather McComb
- Samar Burman, portrayed by Raoul Bhaneja
- Scott Burke, portrayed by Steve Mize
- Sharon Caldwell, portrayed by Molly Baker
- Suzanne Britland, portrayed by Sarah Rafferty
- Tess Anderson, portrayed by Beanie Feldstein

==== Season 17 ====
- Abby Banks, portrayed by Hannah Bamberg
- Arthur Beaton
- Betsy, portrayed by Barbara Lee Bragg
- Carmen Delgado, portrayed by Marlene Forte
- Chad Anderson, portrayed by Coby Ryan McLaughlin
- Chris Beaton, portrayed by Daniel Augustin
- Hollie Beaton, portrayed by Farelle Walker
- James Chee, portrayed by Robert I. Mesa
- Jerry Bletzer, portrayed by Ivan Leung
- Terri Akumbu, portrayed by Délé Ogundiran

==== Season 18 ====
- Aaliyah, portrayed by Kimberly Aria Peterson
- Ava, portrayed by Alison Lauren Chin
- Cathi, portrayed by Kahyun Kim
- Jamarah Blake, portrayed by Dawnn Lewis
- Pat Aquino, portrayed by Alain Uly
- Tara Brown, portrayed by Alexis Raich

==== Season 19 ====
- Aaron, portrayed by Rhyan Hill
- Alacia, portrayed by Brittanie Sheree
- Officer Almeida, portrayed by Zeke Alton
- Andra, portrayed by Shein Mompremier
- Bruno, portrayed by Coy Stewart
- Carlton Allyn, portrayed by Ryan
- Carmen Alvarez, portrayed by Alexandra Metz
- Cody Arkins, portrayed by Brent Walker
- Elena Chavez, portrayed by Michelle C. Bonilla
- Elliot Asaki, portrayed by Rick Kumazawa
- Enzo Alvarez, portrayed by River Manix
- Georgia Arkins, portrayed by Marcelle LeBlanc
- Jameel Al-Hasan, portrayed by T.J. Ramini
- Jarah Al-Hasan, portrayed by Ryan Pekar
- Jonathan Bright, portrayed by Iman Nazemzadeh
- Ken Bendix, portrayed by Michael Sasaki
- Lindsay Allyn, portrayed by Jackie Tohn
- Lucia Castelino, portrayed by Georgia T. Willow
- Maxine Anderson, portrayed by Juliet Mills
- Natalia Asaki, portrayed by Johanna Curé
- Natalie Benardi, portrayed by Jan Hoag
- Paola Bright, portrayed by Daya Vaidya
- Shenai Arkins, portrayed by Kristin Slaysman
- Tobey Barrett, portrayed by Karen Obilom

==== Season 20 ====
- Allie Best, portrayed by Kimberly Drummond
- Andreas Cardenas, portrayed by David Noroña
- Angela, portrayed by Syra McCarthy
- Ann, portrayed by Lesley Fera
- Billy Best, portrayed by Kasey Mahaffy
- Bo Best, portrayed by Phil Hendrie
- Charlotte Best, portrayed by Kinsley Morman
- Dorian Cardenas, portrayed by Freddy Miyares
- Herb Best, portrayed by Howard Ferguson Woitzman
- Ian Alves, portrayed by Christopher Livingston
- Jessica Ardilla, portrayed by Alisa Allapach
- Nate Ardilla, portrayed by Garrett Coffey
- Patty Best, portrayed by Donna Pescow
- Valeria Cardenas, portrayed by Jacqueline Obradors

==== Season 21 ====
- Andrea, portrayed by Jane Widdop
- Anna Anderson, portrayed by Lisa Costanza
- Arash, portrayed by Alan Aymie
- Beau Caraway, portrayed by Trevor Donovan
- Bella, portrayed by Meara Mahoney
- Bob, portrayed by Tom Simmons
- Brendon Browning, portrayed by Cooper Roth
- Brent, portrayed by Alimi Ballard
- Nurse Brian, portrayed by Joseph Bayard
- Officer Bruno, portrayed by Fareed Ward
- Cameron, portrayed by Jacob Bond
- Carl, portrayed by Miller Tai
- Carrie, portrayed by Sydney Malakeh
- Cass Beckman, portrayed by Sophia Bush
- David Beckman, portrayed by Wil Traval
- Joseph Chase, portrayed by Craig Bierko
- Leah Caraway, portrayed by Anastasia Barzee
- Vaughn Bishop, portrayed by Wyatt Walter

==== Season 22 ====
- Aaron, portrayed by J Chase Bailey
- John Burnett, portrayed by Aaron Vargas

Maya Deluca-Bishop, portrayed by Danielle Savre
