= True Colors (Grey's Anatomy) =

- Grey's Anatomy episode
- Episode no.: Season 13; Episode 23
- Directed by: Kevin McKidd
- Written by: William Harper
- Original air date: May 11, 2017
- Running time: 41 minutes

Guest appearances
- Marika Domińczyk as Dr. Eliza Minnick; Matthew Morrison as Dr. Paul Stadler

Episode chronology
← Previous "Leave it Inside"	Next → "Ring of Fire"
- Grey's Anatomy season 13

"True Colors" is the twenty-third and the penultimate episode of the thirteenth season of the American medical drama Grey's Anatomy, and the 292nd episode overall. Written by William Harper and directed by Kevin McKidd, the episode aired on the American Broadcasting Company (ABC) in the United States on May 11, 2017.

The episode focuses on Owen Hunt (McKidd) as he learns shocking news about the fate of his sister, Megan (Abigail Spencer), who had been missing in action and is the fiancée of Nathan Riggs (Martin Henderson). Meanwhile, Alex Karev (Justin Chambers) uncovers the identity of Jo Wilson's (Camilla Luddington) abusive ex-husband, leading to an emotional confrontation. At Grey Sloan Memorial, the doctors treat a couple involved in a car accident, only to later realize that one of them is a rapist and the other his victim.

The episode served as a key setup for the season finale as well as the eventual departure of series regular Jerrika Hinton (Stephanie Edwards).

Upon its original broadcast, "True Colors" was watched by 7.02 million viewers in the United States, ranking #2 in its time-slot, and earned a 1.8/7 Nielsen rating in the 18–49 demographic. The episode received positive reviews from television critics, with high praise directed towards the performances of McKidd and Hinton.

== Plot ==
The episode opens with a voice-over narration from Meredith Grey (Ellen Pompeo) about the fleeting nature of perfect moments and the unpredictability of life.

Meredith wakes up next to Nathan Riggs (Martin Henderson) after a date night and hurriedly asks him to leave before her three children notice him. Struggling with the idea of entering a new relationship after her husband Derek Shepherd's (Patrick Dempsey) death, she tells Nathan she isn't ready for him to meet her kids. Meanwhile, Owen Hunt (Kevin McKidd) is visited by two army soldiers who deliver shocking news about his sister Megan (Abigail Spencer), who had been missing in action for years.

As the day progresses, Meredith reconsiders and nervously invites Nathan to meet her children after a conversation with Amelia Shepherd (Caterina Scorsone), who encourages her to move on. Owen, however, spirals after learning that Megan has been found alive, exhibiting erratic behavior and showing signs of PTSD. Amelia confronts him, and Owen reveals that Megan was discovered in a rebel-held neighborhood and is currently being treated at an army hospital in Germany. While Owen struggles to believe the news, Amelia takes matters into her own hands and contacts Teddy Altman (Kim Raver) to arrange Megan's transfer to Grey Sloan Memorial.

Stephanie Edwards (Jerrika Hinton), returning to work after mandated counseling sessions overseen by Eliza Minnick (Marika Domińczyk), deals with her emotional turmoil while treating patients. She and Jackson Avery (Jesse Williams) discover that one of the patients from a car accident is actually a victim of a kidnapping and rape attempt, Alison.

After being informed about the lockdown, Keith holds a scalpel to Stephanie' neck, threatening her to take him to see Alison, the woman he had assaulted. However, they both end up trapped on an empty floor along with Erin, a young girl who had been wandering the hospital unattended while her frantic parents were preoccupied with her baby sister, who had nearly choked on a penny. Keith grows increasingly agitated when Stephanie tells him that the lockdown will only be lifted in the event of a major emergency, such as a fire.

Alex Karev (Justin Chambers) attends a medical conference in Los Angeles, where he comes face to face with Paul Stadler (Matthew Morrison), Jo Wilson’s (Camilla Luddington) abusive, estranged husband. Alex imagines multiple scenarios of confronting Paul but ultimately chooses restraint, knowing that any rash action could land him in prison and put Jo in more danger.

In a desperate attempt to trigger the fire alarm system, Keith lights a piece of cloth soaked in alcohol on fire, hoping it will set off the smoke detectors. As he holds the burning cloth toward the alarm, Stephanie notices the discarded scalpel lying next to the bottle of alcohol he had used. She quickly assesses the situation and tells Erin to turn around and cover her eyes, framing it like a game of "hide-and-seek". Seizing the moment, Stephanie rushes forward, grabs the bottle of alcohol, and douses Keith with it. A stray ember from the cloth falls onto Keith, igniting him instantly.

Stephanie tries to flee with Erin, but as she glances back, she sees Keith collapsing next to a cluster of oxygen tanks. Realizing the imminent danger, she attempts to drag him away, but before she can reach him, the tanks explode in a fiery blast.

The explosion is seen from outside the hospital by Meredith, who has just arrived, searching for Nathan, to inform him about Megan's return.

== Production ==
"True Colors" was conceived as a vehicle for the eventual exit of series regular Jerrika Hinton in the season finale, "Ring of Fire".

== Release ==
"True Colors" was originally broadcast on May 11, 2017 in the United States on the American Broadcasting Company (ABC), and was watched by 7.02 million viewers, ranking #2 in its time-slot, and earned a 1.8/7 Nielsen rating in the 18–49 demographic.

== Reception ==
"True Colors" received positive reviews from television critics, with high praise directed towards the performances of Kevin McKidd (Owen Hunt) and Jerrika Hinton (Stephanie Edwards).

Ashley Bissette Sumerel of Tell-Tale TV awarded the episode 4/5 stars, praising its conflict and suspense but critiquing the episode's ending and the subplot involving Alex Karev (Justin Chambers) and Jo Wilson’s (Camilla Luddington) abusive, estranged husband, Paul Stadler (Matthew Morrison). She remarked, "We get a bit more focus on Alex — something that’s been strangely missing for much of the season — but it doesn’t seem to go anywhere."

Gwen Ihnat from The A.V. Club also praised the episode, highlighting child actress Darby Camp’s performance and the clever use of a twist in the main patient’s storyline. Ihnat commended the direction, stating, "McKidd directed, doing a fine job with an episode that included his own character’s breakdown."
