= Guess Who's Coming to Dinner (Grey's Anatomy) =

- Grey's Anatomy episode
- Meredith opens the door for Callie and Penny.
- Episode no.: Season 12; Episode 5
- Directed by: Debbie Allen
- Written by: Mark Driscoll
- Original air date: October 22, 2015
- Running time: 43 minutes

Guest appearances
- Samantha Sloyan as Dr. Penelope Blake; Joe Adler as Dr. Isaac Cross

Episode chronology
← Previous "Old Time Rock and Roll"	Next → "The Me Nobody Knows"
- Grey's Anatomy season 12

"Guess Who's Coming to Dinner" is the fifth episode of the twelfth season of the American television medical drama Grey's Anatomy, and the 250th episode overall. It aired October 22, 2015 on ABC in the United States. The episode was written by Mark Driscoll and directed by executive producer Debbie Allen. On its initial airing the episode was watched by 8.96 million viewers and received widespread critical acclaim upon from television critics and audiences.

The episode focuses on the dinner party Dr. Meredith Grey (Ellen Pompeo), Dr. Amelia Shepherd (Caterina Scorsone) and Dr. Maggie Pierce (Kelly McCreary) are hosting, during which Dr. Callie Torres' (Sara Ramirez) new girlfriend Dr. Penelope Blake (Samantha Sloyan) creates tension for the guests when it is revealed that she was one of Derek's doctors when he died. Dr. Arizona Robbins (Jessica Capshaw) tries to get used to Callie's new girlfriend, Dr. April Kepner (Sarah Drew) distracts herself from her husband Dr. Jackson Avery (Jesse Williams), and Dr. Jo Wilson (Camilla Luddington) and Dr. Stephanie Edwards (Jerrika Hinton) have a fight.

== Plot ==
As guests are arriving for the dinner party, Meredith goes to the door to greet Callie and her girlfriend, Penny. Meredith immediately recognizes Penny as the doctor who told her about Derek’s death. At first Meredith just tries avoiding her at all costs, but once Penny confronts her, Meredith tells her that they aren't going to talk about their history. Instead, Penny is to make small talk with everyone but her.

Maggie fears that a possible UTI might be an STD contracted from having sex with Andrew. Even though Maggie is supposed to be cooking dinner, she takes off to the hospital to be tested. With Maggie now gone, a bored April volunteers to cook dinner and recruits the help of others to get the job done.

As Callie takes Penny around to introduce her to everyone, Callie gets paged into the hospital for an emergency consult. Penny insists on leaving with Callie, but Callie demands that she stay and hangout as she'll only be gone a short while. Callie asks Meredith to look after Penny and make sure she feels welcome.

Once dinner is on the table, everyone gathers around to begin eating. As conversation begins to ensue, Penny mentions Callie by her full name, Calliope. Arizona, who has had a little bit too much to drink, remarks that she used to call Callie that. Penny responds that her full name is actually Penelope, so she and Callie have that in common. When Penny reveals her real name, Bailey instantly recognizes her. Penny Blake is going to be the new transfer resident at Grey Sloan Memorial Hospital. This news pushes Meredith over the edge, so she finally tells everyone just exactly who Penny is. The news floors everyone. Meredith takes off upstairs, so Alex follows her. Downstairs, Amelia, who is distraught by her friendly interaction with Penny, lashes out at her demanding to know every detail of the night Derek died. Just in time, Callie and Owen return from the hospital. Despite Owen and Callie’s pleas, Amelia continues to scream and holler at Penny, eventually kicking her out of the house.

Amelia runs upstairs to be with Meredith, telling her that they'll file an appeal to keep Penny out of the hospital. Meredith finally tells Amelia that she's had enough. She's upset that she has to be strong for her three kids while Amelia gets to break down. Amelia only lost her brother, while Meredith lost her husband and the father of her three kids. Becoming more and more outraged, Meredith screams, “Get out of my room!" and tells Owen to get Amelia out of the room "before I kill her!”

Owen and Amelia go to Amelia’s room where she confides in Owen about her imperfect life. She feels inferior to him because his life seems so perfect; he's always calm and logical. Owen consoles Amelia by telling her about the plane crash and how he felt relief when it was possible that Cristina might have been dead. He goes on to say that while he would have been sad, they and their relationship would have been frozen in time. It would have been easier. Owen tells Amelia that they aren't perfect, but that it's ok that they aren't. On the front porch, Penny is trying to call a cab but is interrupted by Callie. Callie asks her why she never told her about Derek. Penny claims that she didn't know if Callie even knew who he was, to which Callie says, “He was my friend.” Torn by the breaking news, Callie is unsure of where this leaves them.

Inside, Jo and Stephanie try to mend their strained friendship. Initially, Jo apologizes for not believing her when she told Amelia about her childhood. Jo continues by saying how they have more in common than they first realized. Jo overcame a crappy childhood, and Stephanie overcame an illness. Once the comparison was made, Stephanie turns the table and finds fault in the comparison. Stephanie once again becomes angry with Jo, because she thinks that Jo has to “level” the playing field instead of just admitting that Stephanie is better than she is.

Back at the hospital, Maggie is waiting on a doctor to come test her for any possible STDs; however, the doctor who was assigned to her turns out to be Andrew. Maggie is so embarrassed by the situation that she asks for another doctor; however, she gets stuck with Andrew and they eventually work out their problems.

Meredith and Alex are left alone in Meredith’s room where Meredith tells Alex he can go. As her new person, he decides to stay and share a bottle of tequila. Meredith goes downstairs to make sure everyone has left and lock the door, but before she goes back upstairs, Penny runs into her. Penny apologizes once again, saying that she thinks about that night every single day. She thinks about what Meredith said to her and how she needed to be better. Penny offers to put in a request to be matched with a different program, but Meredith responds that she'll see her Monday and to not be late.

== Production ==
The episode was written by Mark Driscoll and directed by executive producer Debbie Allen. The table read occurred on September 3, 2015, with filming starting a few days later on September 8, 2015. The cast of Grey's Anatomy had a special celebration for the 250th episode of the show with several actors sharing the celebration on Twitter on September 15, 2015. Jessica Capshaw revealed that the episode included her favorite scene so far in the season.

== Reception ==
=== Broadcasting ===
"Guess Who's Coming to Dinner" was originally broadcast on October 22, 2015 in the United States on American Broadcasting Company (ABC) in the United States. On its initial release the episode was watched by a total of 8.96 million viewers and scored a 2.4/8 in the key 18-49 demographic in the Nielsen ratings, which was an increase from the previous episode "Old Time Rock and Roll" watched by 8.25 million viewers and received a 2.3/8 ratings/share. It was the top TV show in the 8:00 p.m. slot, beating Bones, Heroes Reborn and The Vampire Diaries.

=== Critical reception ===
The episode received widespread critical acclaim and numerous critics went as far as calling it as one of the best episodes of the series in recent years, with Pompeo and Scorsone's performances receiving major praise.

Lauren Hoffman from Cosmopolitan commented on the momentous 250th episode of Grey's Anatomy stating the episode was one of the show's all-time best. She went on to say that the show has always been at its best when focused on complicated emotions, so to make that the focus of the 250th episode was fitting. She wrote, "It's probably strange to say this about a very unconventional episode of Grey's Anatomy, but that was kind of the best episode ever, right? But it's more difficult to describe why it all works as well as it does. It's partially due to the fact that this is the first time we've seen these doctors as a whole group encounter their grief over Derek together — sure, we got truncated scenes in the three-part Derek death-travaganza, but nothing as sustained as this. Watching all the doctors try to make sense of what Penny's saying is fascinating, both because every reaction is so individual and nuanced, and because it's a weird, meta moment reminder of how long all these performers worked with Patrick Dempsey, and how odd his departure must have felt."

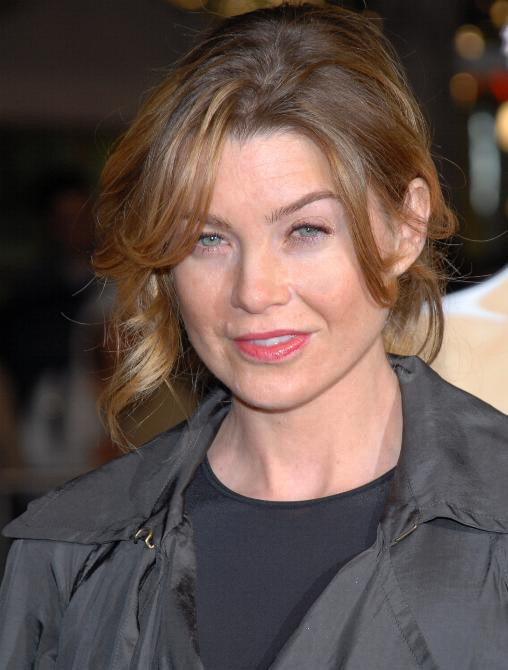
Ellen Pompeo continued to garner critical acclaim for her portrayal of Meredith.

Nad's Review lauding the episode rated the episode with an 'A' grade saying, "There was a lot riding on this one because it’s the 250th episode of Grey’s Anatomy, but I’m glad to report it didn’t disappoint at all. In fact, this has to be one of the best episodes this show has produced in recent years." The site gave Pompeo the credit for making the episode great adding, "There are so many reasons the episode worked, but the main reason is undoubtedly Pompeo’s top-notch performance. She added just the perfect amount of layers to an already complex character, and it was all absolutely nail-biting to watch."

TV Equals also praised the episode writing, "Overall, this was a pretty entertaining episode of Grey’s Anatomy. I’ve had my fill of Perfect Penny and I hope that after the next episode, we’ll get a bit of a reprieve from her. I love episodes with storylines that allow a large number of cast members to interact with each other, while still including intimate moments between smaller subsets. I loved the Alex/Meredith and Amelia/Owen scenes." Furthermore, the site praised Pompeo adding, "Pompeo was great in this episode. I love how she went from offering drinks to people that she never made to staring daggers at Penny. I even loved her meltdown with Amelia and her very callous, but understandable closing the door in Callie’s face."

Ariana Bacle also sang praises for the episode when she wrote in Entertainment Weekly that this episode felt like "Old Grey's" because of the drama, emotion, tears, suspense, and surprises. She notes Alex Karev's concern for Meredith saying, "His unwavering concern for Meredith was one of the best things about the hour. He didn’t give up, even when she kept insisting nothing was wrong; he didn’t leave her, even she insisted she was okay. And friendship is at the core of every great Grey’s episode. In some ways, Cristina’s departure was harder to take than Derek’s because it was implied that she’d always be there. Meredith and Derek were constantly on and off, and although Cristina and Meredith had their tiffs, they were always mostly unbreakable. Couples break up; friends like Meredith and Cristina don’t. Now that she’s gone, Karev is beginning to take on the role of Meredith’s person — and though Cristina is irreplaceable, he’s a pretty great stand-in. Meredith (and Cristina) would probably agree."

However, Ashley Bissette Sumerel from TV Fanatic less enamored wrote "While it's important to remember and talk about Derek, the appearance of Penny Blake and her story arc felt a bit forced." She also added "Season 12 has been very strong so far, but the lighthearted tone probably won't last much longer with the connection between Penny and all the other doctors, the conflict between Meredith and Amelia, and finally Owen's confession about Cristina." Moreover, she also criticised the fight between Jo and Stephanie saying "Jo and Stephanie's arc about their troubled friendship is plain insufferable and I hope there is something else for their storylines as the show furthers into the season."
