= Grey's Anatomy season 13 =

Grey's Anatomy
- Season 13
- DVD cover art for the thirteenth season of Grey's Anatomy
- Showrunners: William Harper; Shonda Rhimes; Stacy McKee
- Starring: Ellen Pompeo; Justin Chambers; Chandra Wilson; James Pickens Jr.; Kevin McKidd; Jessica Capshaw; Sarah Drew; Jesse Williams; Caterina Scorsone; Camilla Luddington; Jerrika Hinton; Kelly McCreary; Jason George; Martin Henderson; Giacomo Gianniotti
- No. of episodes: 24

Release
- Original network: ABC
- Original release: September 22, 2016 – May 18, 2017

Season chronology
- ← Previous; Season 12 Next → Season 14

The thirteenth season of the American television medical drama Grey's Anatomy premiered on September 22, 2016, in the United States on the American Broadcasting Company (ABC), and consisted of 24 episodes. The season was ordered on March 3, 2016, along with ABC's other shows. The season is produced by ABC Studios, in association with Shondaland Production Company and The Mark Gordon Company; the showrunners being William Harper and Stacy McKee.

The bulk of the season revolves around the residency program's teaching operation being analyzed and revamped, with the help of new residency program leader and education consultant Eliza Minnick, portrayed by Marika Dominczyk. The revamp causes tension and divides the staff who disapprove of these new methods. Other plots include the fallout of Alex Karev beating up Andrew DeLuca and his impending trial, Jo Wilson's true identity and past as well as Amelia's trauma over having children.

This season was the first not to feature Sara Ramirez as Dr. Callie Torres since their introduction in the second season, following their departure at the conclusion of the previous season.

On February 10, 2017, ABC renewed Grey's Anatomy for a fourteenth season.

The website Screen Rant ranked the season #14 on their 2023 ranking of the 19 Grey's Anatomy seasons.

== Episodes ==
The number in the "No. overall" column refers to the episode's number within the overall series, whereas the number in the "No. in season" column refers to the episode's number within this particular season. "U.S. viewers in millions" refers to the number of Americans in millions who watched the episodes live. Each episode of this season is named after a song.

No. overall	No. in season	Title	Directed by	Written by	Original release date	Prod. code	U.S. viewers (millions)
270	1	"Undo"	Debbie Allen	William Harper	September 22, 2016	1301	8.75
While Amelia and Owen's wedding continues, Andrew is brought to the ER after being assaulted by Alex, leading Meredith and the other doctors to the hospital to help. Meredith faces a dilemma about protecting Alex or telling Bailey the truth about the assault. Meanwhile, April and Catherine Avery clash about naming the new baby. Nathan and Meredith continue to work out their relationship at the same time as they try to hide it from Maggie, who is affected by Andrew's assault. In the end, Meredith tells Bailey the truth, but not before Alex turns himself in to the police. Absent: Jessica Capshaw as Arizona Robbins due to maternity leave
271	2	"Catastrophe and the Cure"	Kevin McKidd	Karin Gist	September 29, 2016	1302	8.41
On Andrew's first day back, Alex is charged with felony assault in the second degree. When he is distracted at work, a kid's newly transplanted kidney ends up jeopardized, causing Bailey to decide that Alex can no longer work as a surgeon and demote him to work at the Denny Duquette Memorial Clinic. April has trouble letting go of Harriet, who gets to go home with Jackson. Jackson asks April to move in with him so she can recover. Stephanie proves to be a good friend to Jo, who tells Alex she does not want to be with him after what he did. Per Meredith's request, Nathan turns Maggie down when she finally asks him out, but Maggie's not planning on giving up just yet. Absent: Jessica Capshaw as Arizona Robbins due to maternity leave
272	3	"I Ain't No Miracle Worker"	Rob Corn	Andy Reaser	October 6, 2016	1303	8.08
A car crash at a funeral makes for a hectic day in the ER and Stephanie has to figure out what to do with the corpse. April cannot help but come to the hospital when she gets bored taking care of Harriet. Meredith does not want to listen to Maggie talking about how asking out Nathan has ruined work for her, causing Amelia to mediate between the two. Arizona returns to Seattle after a visit to Callie in New York and finds herself caring for Andrew, but she also misses working with Alex, who's determined to keep working in the clinic so he can come back from what he has done. When Bailey is too busy, Ben teaches Tucker a lesson after he hit someone.
273	4	"Falling Slowly"	Victoria Mahoney	Jen Klein	October 13, 2016	1304	7.80
Alex has a terrible day in the Clinic when nurse Timir keeps bossing him around and will not allow him to go to his strategy session with his lawyer. He turns his day around by diagnosing a very rare condition, Ehlers–Danlos syndrome, thus saving the patient's life. April and Jackson are walking on eggshells with their current living arrangement, but they agree to keep living together after venting their frustrations. When their patient deteriorates, Meredith fears Nathan supported her decision because of what's going on between them and decides she wants to be just colleagues. Jo and Andrew bond since they cannot talk to anyone else about what happened. Amelia and Owen come clean about horrible things from their pasts and decide to have children.
274	5	"Both Sides Now"	Chandra Wilson	Mark Driscoll	October 20, 2016	1305	8.17
Bailey and Meredith find themselves pitted against one another when both of their patients are in need of a liver transplant. Bailey frets that when she asks her elderly patient if she would give permission to redirect the liver to Meredith's 25-year-old patient, she will oblige; however, Bailey's patient denies, leaving Meredith's patient in dire need. Amelia thinks that she is pregnant and starts spreading the news to everyone except Owen. When she breaks the news to him, she takes her first pregnancy test which reveals she is not.
275	6	"Roar"	Nicole Rubio	Elizabeth J.B. Klaviter	October 27, 2016	1306	8.17
Having trained to become better at another hospital, Leah Murphy re-joins the staff of Grey Sloan to learn from Maggie. When he is at the court house to have a trial date set, Alex advises a pregnant woman to have her rash checked out at the clinic; she is found to have pancreatic cancer. Alex butts heads with Bailey so the patient will receive a surgery that means she will not have to terminate her pregnancy. Andrew appears to develop feelings for Jo. After dodging Owen all day, Amelia confesses to Alex that she is relieved she is not pregnant because of what happened in Los Angeles. Catherine decides it's time to investigate why so many past and present residents have needed second chances.
276	7	"Why Try to Change Me Now"	Jeannot Szwarc	Austin Guzman	November 3, 2016	1307	7.60
Miranda and Catherine hire an education consultant, Dr. Eliza Minnick, to overhaul the training at Grey Sloan. Maggie finds a notebook that belongs to Eliza; it contains a list of Attending's names and Maggie is at the very end - she says that she has never been at the end of any list. Amelia and Owen fight over which procedure to do first on a patient. Stephanie assists Amelia during the operation while Owen monitors the patient. April goes on a date with someone she found on Tinder and tells Jackson it went great. However, she later tells Jackson in the observation lounge that the date went bad. Maggie teaches Murphy on a high risk procedure while Eliza is present in the OR and Andrew is observing. Dr Minnick wants to teach Andrew a procedure so she nicks a vessel so that Andrew can stop the bleed and learn. Maggie admits she is not a good teacher, but she is a genius and a rockstar. Amelia tells Owen she does not want a baby. Arizona confronts Eliza about the list as to why her name was not on it. Eliza says that the list was only for learning peoples' names, and she would never forget Arizona Robbins.
277	8	"The Room Where It Happens"	Debbie Allen	Meg Marinis	November 10, 2016	1308	7.25
A male patient is wheeled into the OR where Meredith, Owen, and Stephanie are waiting. Meredith has been up for 48 hours and Owen at least as long. Richard shows up to help having napped all day. Richard wants the patient to be given a name; he picks Gail, a cello player and music teacher. Each of the doctors has a flashback to a tragic incident from their past. Owen flashes back to working with his sister. She tells him to cut it out, meaning the liver, and he does. Stephanie is asked to contact UNOS to get the patient added to donor list. Stephanie determines the patient has an autoimmune disease, ITP. The doctors argue as to what needs to done at each stage in the OR. The patient is identified as Carl Henley from a photo they took of him to show a woman who called about her husband. Gail was Richard's mother, who had pancreatic cancer and died when he was ten. Meredith eventually suggests using part of Carl's own liver, calling it a hail Mary. The repaired liver is put back in, before moving him to the ICU. Meredith apologizes to Richard for the things she said. Absent: Justin Chambers as Alex Karev, Chandra Wilson as Miranda Bailey, and Caterina Scorsone as Amelia Shepherd due to maternity leave.
278	9	"You Haven't Done Nothin'"	Rob Corn	Karin Gist	November 17, 2016	1309	8.04
A building collapse crowds the hospital with injured people. Looking for forgiveness, the landlord confides in Ben that he did not have the money to fix the damage caused by an earthquake last year, leading to the collapse. Maggie and Richard's 12-year-old patient dies on the table. Having overheard Ben and Stephanie talking about the landlord, the girl's parents seek to avenge her death. Richard finds out that Eliza will take over his job and confronts Bailey about this. Maggie and Jackson gather the other attendings to stand up for Richard. Arizona and Eliza continue flirting in spite of the latter's arrogant side. Fearing the subpoena, Jo tells Alex about her violent marriage, making him reconsider taking the plea deal and going to jail for 2 years. While waiting for the DA, he listens to a voicemail Meredith left him after his goodbye to her. Meredith tells him he is stronger and bigger than giving up and promises him she will go down swinging for him, making him doubt taking the plea deal. Amelia takes off and leaves Owen with a note, asking him not to blame himself for it.
279	10	"You Can Look (But You'd Better Not Touch)"	Jann Turner	Tia Napolitano	January 26, 2017	1313	9.59
On the day before Alex's trial, Bailey, Arizona and Jo drive with medical equipment including an advanced ultrasound machine to a maximum security women's prison hospital to treat a violent teenage inmate and her unborn baby. Jo bonds with the inmate, who says that she had good times with her mother in the past and that her mother will be taking care of the baby for her until she is released. However, her mother is downstairs and tells the doctors that her actual plan is to adopt the baby. The doctors wrestle with whether to tell the inmate about this news, given her violent tendencies. When the inmate goes into labor she demands to see her mother. Jo finally says that she is downstairs but refuses to come up, and the doctors help the inmate through the delivery. Later Arizona scornfully tells her mother that the delivery was a success, and asks whether she will abandon this baby too if she turns out bad. Meanwhile, Bailey learns about the realities of patient care in a prison environment. On the way back home, Bailey tells Jo that Alex plans to take the plea deal and will be going to jail, which makes her throw up. Note: Only Chandra Wilson, Jessica Capshaw, and Camilla Luddington make physical appearances in this episode to accommodate various main cast members' maternity leaves. Ellen Pompeo provides a voice-over role only.
280	11	"Jukebox Hero"	Kevin Rodney Sullivan	Zoanne Clack	February 2, 2017	1310	8.49
Maggie and Meredith find out that Alex's trial has been indefinitely postponed, leading them to think that Alex has taken the plea and is therefore in jail. Meredith sets out to find him, but to no avail. Owen is looking for Amelia, who's hiding at Stephanie's place. Owen finds out when Stephanie lets it slip that she asked Amelia to look at their patient's scan and he asks her to ask Amelia to come home, though Amelia refuses. Maggie, April, Nathan, and Jackson spend all day denying Eliza Minnick access to their OR whereas Richard allows her to join him so he can demonstrate that he is ready to fight her, leading to Bailey confronting Richard and revealing she is not the only one who felt this change was needed. Arizona and Leah work on a pregnant mother who was in a car accident caused by her husband. Allowing Leah to work on the baby while she is dealing with the mother, Arizona puts Eliza's method to work, which Eliza interprets as Arizona being on her team. Ben spends all day working alongside and covering for a grumpy Jo, who refuses to talk about what's happened with Alex. Andrew is surprised when Arizona admits that she misses Alex. After a long day, Meredith finally finds Alex in her bed, where he has been sleeping all day.
281	12	"None of Your Business"	Geary McLeod	Andy Reaser	February 9, 2017	1311	8.46
Alex reveals that Andrew made the D.A. drop the charges by threatening to otherwise tank the case with a (fake) testimony. When Alex confronts him about his reasons for doing so, Andrew states he did it because Jo's been through enough. Alex gets his job back while Meredith gets suspended for refusing to let Eliza into her OR. Jo, who spent the day at home, only finds out about Alex later and goes to visit him at Meredith's. Maggie's mother Diane comes to Seattle to have Jackson remove a rash, but it turns out she is suffering from inflammatory breast cancer. Jackson helps her prepare to tell Maggie, but before she can do so, Maggie has an outburst, revealing she is still struggling with her mother destroying her parents' marriage. Richard finds out that Catherine's on Bailey's side. Bailey hires April as Interim Head of General Surgery. Amelia continues to hide out at Stephanie's apartment, and Owen decides he is done waiting for her.
282	13	"It Only Gets Much Worse"	Jeannot Szwarc	Lauren Barnett	February 16, 2017	1312	7.68
Dr. Minnick implements phase 2 of her teaching plan, where two residents a week get to lead a surgery from start to finish. Ben's first experience is ruined by Bailey and Webber arguing and Stephanie's 9-year-old patient dies. Stephanie is comforted by Webber, while instead of teaching her how to deal with loss, Eliza flees. Arizona learns that she has never lost a child before and comforts her. April steps in as interim Head of General Surgery but the attendings give her the cold shoulder, especially Maggie, who believes April deserted Webber and is now on Bailey's side. April and Maggie are forced to work together on a patient of Meredith's, who is reluctant to have a surgeon she does not know operate on her. Catherine bonds with April and takes her out to dinner to celebrate her new job. Absent: Justin Chambers as Alex Karev and Caterina Scorsone as Amelia Shepherd due to maternity leave. Ellen Pompeo provides a voice-over role only due to maternity leave.
283	14	"Back Where You Belong"	Oliver Bokelberg	Jen Klein	February 23, 2017	1314	7.71
Alex returns to the hospital, but finds himself doing resident work because of Eliza's teaching method. Bailey visits a bored Meredith in an attempt to get her to agree to come back, but Meredith only does so when Webber drops by and convinces her not to do this to her career just because of him. April, Webber, Alex, and Jo get caught in a moral dilemma when a mother's only kidney dies in the middle of a kidney transplant to her son. A possible solution means accepting a kidney from the abusive husband whom the patient left, which hits close to home for Jo. Maggie and Nathan treat a patient with mental illness who disappeared on her parents 12 years ago. Arizona has to hide her new friendship with Eliza from her colleagues, and the two of them end up kissing.
284	15	"Civil War"	Nicole Rubio	Elizabeth J.B. Klaviter	March 9, 2017	1315	7.31
Richard is revealed to be sleeping at the hospital, as politics within Grey Sloan Memorial boil over and spill in to his marriage with Catherine. Alex receives a tough peds case on a newborn baby with a heart problem. Tackling the case with Andrew, who is now "cool" with Alex, they together proceed to go through with a procedure until Nathan is brought into the case. As Alex and Nathan clash over different surgical procedures, each of them ask Andrew to contact different people as Andrew juggles whose orders to obey. April, Jackson, Webber, and Catherine are in the midst of a tough trauma case of a man who had an accident with another man and a deep fryer. As they begin their operation, Catherine tries to talk with Webber about their marriage and coming home which causes awkwardness within the OR. Meanwhile, Eliza invites Arizona out to a date at Arizona's house while Meredith hears about the growing conflict between Nathan and Alex and tells Nathan to back off on Alex's patient, causing Nathan to storm away in anger while it is revealed that Andrew called UNOS betraying Alex. As he prepares to go into his surgery, Alex sees that Andrew decided to obey Nathan which causes him to call Maggie who tells the two surgeons to get their act together. After his surgery, Webber accidentally walks in on Eliza and Arizona kissing, exposing their secret relationship. Meredith, who hears about the fight between Nathan and Alex, tells Nathan to back off and to not fight with Alex, causing Nathan to give her an ultimatum about their relationship, while Catherine and Richard's marriage lies more divided than ever before.
285	16	"Who Is He (And What Is He to You)?"	Kevin McKidd	Elisabeth R. Finch	March 16, 2017	1316	7.90
April and Jackson travel to Bozeman, Montana, to perform a throat transplant on a girl, leaving Harriet with Catherine. The two discover they still need to get consent from the donor's heartbroken father, for which Jackson uses his experiences with fatherhood. However, when a lesion is discovered on the donor, the transplant is off the table, meaning a laryngectomy is the girl's only option despite her parents' objection. April discovers that Jackson took the case because his father owns a diner near the hospital, and encourages a distracted Jackson to go talk to his father so his head can be in the game for their patient. Jackson does so and discovers that his father left because being an Avery did not fit him, and that he has a happy life and never actually missed his son. Jackson comes up with a solution for the girl and he and April pull it off. They end up sleeping together and agree that this was the reason Catherine had Meredith switched for April. Before returning to Seattle, Jackson goes to tell Robert that despite being glad to have met him, he is not actually his father. Note: This is the first episode not to feature Meredith Grey since the pilot due to Ellen Pompeo's maternity leave. Only Jesse Williams and Sarah Drew appear in this episode as Jackson Avery and April Kepner respectively.
286	17	"'Til I Hear It From You"	Kevin McKidd	Austin Guzman	March 23, 2017	1317	7.80
After receiving chemo at home, Maggie's mother returns to Seattle to undergo a mastectomy, performed by Jackson. Maggie cannot understand her mother getting a breast augmentation, only to learn the devastating truth later. Stephanie meets one of her idols when the man's wife collapses during a hike. The woman has a brain bleed, but the surgery is very risky due to her comorbidities. Her eventual death has Stephanie questioning her profession, and Andrew admits to her that he loves Jo. After he tells her to figure out what she wants, Amelia tells Owen that she feels suffocated by him and that he does not get to set the rules in their marriage. Amelia questions if he is ready for parenthood, which may turn out quite differently from the dream he has. Meredith wants a reason to date Nathan. He talks about how he fell in love with her and how he feels about her, leading to her agreeing to have dinner with him. Arizona and Webber clear the air between them. A complication during Diane's surgery leaves Maggie devastated.
287	18	"Be Still, My Soul"	Ellen Pompeo	Meg Marinis	March 30, 2017	1318	7.62
A spot on a scan alongside her chest wall causes a downward spiral for Maggie's mother. After surgery to remove the left-behind mass, Diane is found to have a metastasis in her liver. Meredith refuses to operate while Maggie thinks it's the way to go, resulting in Diane firing Meredith from her case. Bailey does the surgery when Maggie gets her hopes up about a trial, which Diane enrolls in after the successful surgery. Despite all the side effects, Diane has a good day and she teaches Maggie to cook lasagna, but she starts coughing up blood during a dinner with Maggie's friends. Richard fixes the esophageal tear in surgery, but Diane's health continues to deteriorate. Diane thinks Maggie will be hurt if she stops fighting, but Richard convinces her that Maggie's strong enough to handle it. Diane then stops the treatment and, after imparting wisdom and offering advice to her daughter, she passes away. Richard realizes he is not a father figure to Maggie and calls in Bill Pierce to comfort her. He also buries the feud with Bailey. Nathan and Meredith agree their timing's off and decide to postpone their promised dinner as Maggie would need Meredith to be there for her. Absent: Camilla Luddington as Jo Wilson due to maternity leave. Jerrika Hinton as Stephanie Edwards. Giacomo Gianniotti as Andrew DeLuca.
288	19	"What's Inside"	Nzingha Stewart	Tia Napolitano	April 6, 2017	1320	7.23
Stephanie and Andrew have to take care of intern Isaac, who has abdominal pain and insists it's not "internitis" as Stephanie thinks. Maggie teams up with Arizona to remove a delicate tumor from a fetus's chest while her colleagues worry she is not ready yet, given it's her first day back. Meredith agrees to hang out with Nathan to see if it could go somewhere before she tells Maggie. When Nathan finds out about her and Eliza, Arizona befriends Nathan and gives him some well-intended advice about dating Meredith. Richard and Bailey begin to work things out between them while Jackson attempts to console a distraught Maggie. Absent: Camilla Luddington as Jo Wilson due to maternity leave
289	20	"In the Air Tonight"	Chandra Wilson	Stacy McKee	April 13, 2017	1319	7.06
Nathan and Meredith end up on a flight to a conference together. She tries to ignore his moves but ends up having sex with him in the bathroom, insisting it does not mean anything. After heavy turbulence hits, Meredith and Nathan tend to the injured while receiving help from Harrison Peters, a pediatric dentist. In a quiet moment, Meredith tells Nathan about her own plane crash and losing her sister Lexie. One of their patients starts showing signs of an epidural brain bleed while the pilot is unable to land the plane because it's caught between two storm systems. Meredith continuously has to relieve pressure on the man's brain with a needle and syringe on the shaky plane, while Nathan has to save a man with pulmonary hypertension. When the plane finally lands, Nathan questions how Meredith can still be scared of letting go of Derek and starting something with him. She then decides to ignore her fear of yet again losing someone she cares about, and agrees to give it a chance. Note: Only main cast members Ellen Pompeo and Martin Henderson appear in this episode.
290	21	"Don't Stop Me Now"	Louis Venosta	Andy Reaser	April 27, 2017	1321	7.02
April, Andrew, Stephanie, and Richard have bad news for their patient and her new boyfriend when she turns out to have worms breeding in her intestines. Bailey enlists April's help to get Catherine and Richard back together, but it turns out that Bailey's similarity to Catherine is the key. During a press conference about the events on the plane, Maggie derives that something happened between Nathan and Meredith. Meredith tries to explain things to an angry Maggie and ask for her forgiveness. Alex's pregnant patient with pancreatic cancer from the Clinic returns to the hospital. Her cancer has metastasized to her spine, messing up the parents' plan for the future. The case strikes a chord with Amelia in particular. Absent: Camilla Luddington as Jo Wilson due to maternity leave
291	22	"Leave It Inside"	Zetna Fuentes	Elisabeth R. Finch	May 4, 2017	1322	7.09
April and Meredith discover that their patient has an inoperable heart tumor, which the patient already knew about. While the woman has made peace with it and has resorted to having as much good sex as she can before dying, Maggie cannot let it go that easily. However, she comes to realize that there's nothing she can do. Inspired to do what's good for her in the moment, Meredith removes the tumor and post-it from her bedroom wall and takes Nathan home with her. Eliza and Arizona have sex after a whole day of anticipation. Richard has to second Eliza's statement that Ben has been playing it safe lately, while Stephanie lets her anger take over when a religious father threatens to sue the hospital for operating on his son's life-threatening tumor without his and his wife's permission. Andrew plans to tell Jo about his feelings, but she stops him since she already knows. Absent: Kevin McKidd as Owen Hunt
292	23	"True Colors"	Kevin McKidd	William Harper	May 11, 2017	1323	7.02
Alex hires a private investigator and finds Jo's husband, Paul Stadler. He attends a conference where Paul is speaking, but he realizes that whatever he does will end badly for either Jo or himself and opts to let Paul go without a confrontation. Owen receives news that his sister was found in a basement after a raid in a rebel-led neighborhood. Amelia supports him and calls Teddy to verify Megan's identity and secure her transfer to Grey Sloan. Back at the hospital, the doctors are thrown for a loop when they discover that their half-naked car accident victims are not a couple, but instead a woman who drove off the cliff on purpose to avoid getting raped. This discovery comes too late for Stephanie, whom the rapist has captured to secure an easy way out of the hospital. When the hospital lockdown traps Stephanie and Erin, a young girl wandering around the hospital, with the rapist, the rapist starts a fire to open the doors. Stephanie seizes the opportunity and sets the man on fire, but he drags himself towards gas tanks in a lab. Just as Stephanie goes to drag him away, the tanks explode. Absent: Camilla Luddington as Jo Wilson due to maternity leave
293	24	"Ring of Fire"	Debbie Allen	Stacy McKee	May 18, 2017	1324	7.92
As the flames rage throughout Grey Sloan, Bailey issues a mass-evacuation while Jackson and Meredith desperately search for Stephanie and Nathan. Stephanie, who is revealed to be alive, is forced to perform a surgery on Erin's leg, while the flames grow even bigger and looms closer towards the duo. Meanwhile, Owen and Amelia continue preparing for their journey, despite finding out about the incident at the hospital, to visit Owen's MIA sister, Megan. Back at the hospital, Stephanie is forced to go to extremes as she braves the growing flames on her floor, ending up in the staircase. Crawling towards the roof access with Erin in tow, Stephanie comes to the horrifying realization that her key card is missing, which is needed to open the door. Seeing no other option, she wraps Erin in a water-soaked blanket as she prepares to sacrifice herself. But just as the smoke reaches her, she sees that her key card is within sight and fights to retrieve it. As Stephanie and Erin at last enter onto the roof, Erin codes leaving Stephanie hysterical for help. As Stephanie is performing CPR while screaming for assistance, Ben leads a group of firefighters towards Stephanie's location, finally rescuing her at last. In the aftermath of the blaze, Eliza is fired by Bailey after an inquiry regarding the fire. Erin is alive and in recovery, and Stephanie is recovering from her burns as she tearfully tells Richard she is quitting. Nathan learns about Megan from Meredith who encourages him to reunite with his true love. Maggie is told by April that if she wants she could see Jackson. Owen and Amelia finally arrive at Madigan Army Medical Center as Megan's helicopter lands and she is pulled away on a gurney towards Owen, as he at long last comes to terms that his sister is truly alive. Absent: Camilla Luddington as Jo Wilson due to maternity leave.

== Cast and characters ==
=== Main ===
- Ellen Pompeo as Dr. Meredith Grey
- Justin Chambers as Dr. Alex Karev
- Chandra Wilson as Dr. Miranda Bailey
- James Pickens Jr. as Dr. Richard Webber
- Kevin McKidd as Dr. Owen Hunt
- Jessica Capshaw as Dr. Arizona Robbins
- Sarah Drew as Dr. April Kepner
- Jesse Williams as Dr. Jackson Avery
- Caterina Scorsone as Dr. Amelia Shepherd
- Camilla Luddington as Dr. Jo Wilson
- Jerrika Hinton as Dr. Stephanie Edwards
- Kelly McCreary as Dr. Maggie Pierce
- Jason George as Dr. Ben Warren
- Martin Henderson as Dr. Nathan Riggs
- Giacomo Gianniotti as Dr. Andrew DeLuca

=== Recurring ===
- Tessa Ferrer as Dr. Leah Murphy
- Joe Adler as Dr. Isaac Cross
- Debbie Allen as Dr. Catherine Avery
- Vivian Nixon as Dr. Hannah Brody
- LaTanya Richardson Jackson as Diane Pierce
- Marika Dominczyk as Dr. Eliza Minnick

=== Notable guests ===
- Sumalee Montano as Lena McCallister
- Kimberly Quinn as Reena Thompson
- Rusty Schwimmer as Patricia Phillips
- Jen Lilley as Kara Fisher
- Vicki Davis as Morgan Fisher
- Betsy Baker as Barbara Davis
- Ravi Patel as Timir Dhar
- Bridget Regan as Dr. Megan Hunt
- Wallace Langham as Dr. Steve Corridan
- Anjul Nigam as Dr. Raj Sen
- K Callan as Janis
- Matthew Alan as David Fisher
- June Squibb as Dr. Elsie Clatch
- Hal Holbrook as Dr. Lewis Clatch
- Eric Roberts as Dr. Robert Avery
- Matthew Morrison as Dr. Paul Stadler

•Lisseth Chavez as Kate Endris •Alexandra Barreto as Pam

== Production ==
=== Development ===
Grey's Anatomy was renewed for a 13th season by ABC on March 3, 2016. TVLine announced that the 13th season will begin airing on September 22, 2016. Production began on May 25, 2016, when Rhimes announced on Twitter that the writers were in full swing mapping the 13th season. Production began on July 21, 2016, with prepping for the season officially starting on July 28, 2016. The table read for the premiere was on July 22, 2016. Filming for the season began on August 1, 2016, with Shonda Rhimes tweeting that the crew were filming the 270th episode of the series, the season premiere. A promotional poster for the season was released on August 2, 2016, portraying Dr. Meredith Grey in Seattle, for which the series is located. The poster started speculation of its meaning towards the storyline for the 13th season. However Rhimes denied the speculation about the poster on Twitter as she said "For anyone trying to interpret the "meaning" of the new Grey's Anatomy poster design: it means ABC designs really cool posters."

The remaining fall schedule for ABC was announced on October 22, 2016, where it was announced that Grey's Anatomy would air nine episodes in the fall, rather than eight episode the previous two seasons has done, with the fall finale to air on November 17, 2016, just like the rest of ABC's primetime thursday-lineup Notorious and How to Get Away with Murder, which was the same last year. The remaining 15 episodes will air after the winter break beginning airing on January 26, 2017.

=== Writing ===
In an interview with TV Guide, Kelly McCreary said that the 13th season would be focusing heavily on the characters that have been on the show since the first season; Dr. Meredith Grey, Dr. Alex Karev, Dr. Miranda Bailey and Dr. Richard Webber. McCreary went more into the storyline as she commented that "After such a long period of time and so many new people coming in and out, they remain the foundational characters of the show. We're gonna be spending some more time with them to check in with where they are." In another interview, McCreary talked about the love-triangle drama that will unfold between Meredith, Nathan and Maggie, to which she commented on how "Maggie's ego will probably be wounded."

Caterina Scorsone said that Amelia would be "the middle-person between her sisters should the Nathan-news come out." She confirmed that the season premiere will pick up right after where the finale ended and that Justin Chambers' character Alex and his storyline with girlfriend Jo would play a bigger part of the premiere, in addition that Amelia and Kevin McKidd's character Owen would not be much in the premiere. Jessica Capshaw will not be in the first 2 episodes, confirmed by Rhimes, because of wanting to be a little more with her kids. Rhimes reported that Capshaw's character Dr. Arizona Robbins will have a new love-interest.

=== Casting ===
At the end of the twelfth season, the cast's contracts had expired after previously renewing them at the end of the tenth season of Grey's Anatomy. Ellen Pompeo and Patrick Dempsey renewed their contracts for another 2 seasons (seasons 11 and 12) on January 23, 2014, but Dempsey later left the series at the end of the eleventh season. The rest of the 6 original cast mates, Justin Chambers, Chandra Wilson and James Pickens Jr., excluding Sandra Oh, renewed their contracts on May 26, 2014, as Drs. Alex Karev, Miranda Bailey, and Richard Webber, respectively, for the eleventh and twelfth season. Sara Ramirez also renewed her contract for another 2 seasons as Dr. Callie Torres.

On June 28, 2015, before the twelfth season had begun airing, it was announced that Jessica Capshaw, whose contract expired after season 11, had renewed her contract for another 3 seasons as Dr. Arizona Robbins. That meant that her character would be staying on the show through seasons 13 and 14. Kevin McKidd had previously said that he was in negotiations to renew his contract after the twelfth season on January 9, 2016. After the season finale, McKidd confirmed that he would be back for the 13th season. Justin Chambers announced on March 11, 2016, that he had renewed his contract and will be playing Dr. Alex Karev in the 13th season. The Hollywood Reporter reported on May 4, 2016, that the original cast were all negotiating new contracts. After the finale, Pompeo said that she would be returning in the next season, which was officially confirmed by Deadline on June 1, 2016. Series-veteran Sara Ramirez announced after the finale that they would not be returning for season 13 as Dr. Callie Torres, after the character left for New York to be with her girlfriend Dr. Penny Blake. Thus, this will be the first season since her introduction in season 2 in which Dr. Callie Torres, portrayed by Sara Ramirez, is not included in the main cast of characters. On June 10, 2016, it was officially announced that the rest of the cast members whose contracts expired after the twelfth season, Chandra Wilson, James Pickens Jr. and Kevin McKidd, will return for the next season.

On September 28, 2016, it was announced that the Days of Our Lives alum Jen Lilley would appear in the third episode, playing Kara. Bridget Regan announced on her Instagram account that she would be appearing in the eighth episode "The Room Where It Happens". It was reported that Tessa Ferrer would be reprising her role as Dr. Leah Murphy in a recurring role for the 13th season. On October 17, 2016, ABC confirmed that Marika Dominczyk had been cast in a guest stint as Eliza Minnick. On January 31, 2017, it was announced that Jerrika Hinton would be departing the series-regular cast this season.

== Ratings ==
=== Live + SD ratings ===
No. in series	No. in season	Episode	Air date	Time slot (EST)	Rating/Share (18–49)	Viewers (m)	18–49 Rank	Viewership rank	Drama rank
270	1	"Undo"	September 22, 2016	Thursdays; 8:00 p.m.	2.5/9	8.75	12	21	2
271	2	"Catastrophe and the Cure"	September 29, 2016	Thursdays; 8:00 p.m.	2.4/9	8.41	13	25	3
272	3	"I Ain't No Miracle Worker"	October 6, 2016	Thursdays; 8:00 p.m.	2.2/8	8.08	10	18	2
273	4	"Falling Slowly"	October 13, 2016	Thursdays; 8:00 p.m.	2.1/8	7.80	13	23	3
274	5	"Both Sides Now"	October 20, 2016	Thursdays; 8:00 p.m.	2.1/8	8.17	12	21	2
275	6	"Roar"	October 27, 2016	Thursdays; 8:00 p.m.	2.2/8	8.17	14	24	2
276	7	"Why Try to Change Me Now"	November 3, 2016	Thursdays; 8:00 p.m.	2.1/7	7.60	10	19	2
277	8	"The Room Where It Happens"	November 10, 2016	Thursdays; 8:00 p.m.	1.9/7	7.25	15	22	2
278	9	"You Haven't Done Nothin'"	November 17, 2016	Thursdays; 8:00 p.m.	2.2/8	8.04	10	21	2
279	10	"You Can Look (But You'd Better Not Touch)"	January 26, 2017	Thursdays; 8:00 p.m.	2.6/9	9.59	2	6	2
280	11	"Jukebox Hero"	February 2, 2017	Thursdays; 8:00 p.m.	2.3/8	8.49	4	8	1
281	12	"None of Your Business"	February 9, 2017	Thursdays; 8:00 p.m.	2.1/8	8.46	7	10	2
282	13	"It Only Gets Much Worse"	February 16, 2017	Thursdays; 8:00 p.m.	2.1/7	7.68	4	13	2
283	14	"Back Where You Belong"	February 23, 2017	Thursdays; 8:00 p.m.	2.0/7	7.71	8	12	2
284	15	"Civil War"	March 9, 2017	Thursdays; 8:00 p.m.	1.9/7	7.31	6	18	2
285	16	"Who Is He (And What Is He to You)?"	March 16, 2017	Thursdays; 8:00 p.m.	2.0/8	7.90	6	10	2
286	17	"Till I Hear It From You"	March 23, 2017	Thursdays; 8:00 p.m.	1.9/7	7.80	9	12	2
287	18	"Be Still, My Soul"	March 30, 2017	Thursdays; 8:00 p.m.	2.0/8	7.62	9	16	2
288	19	"What's Inside"	April 6, 2017	Thursdays; 8:00 p.m.	1.7/7	7.23	8	17	2
289	20	"In the Air Tonight"	April 13, 2017	Thursdays; 8:00 p.m.	1.8/7	7.06	4	12	2
290	21	"Don't Stop Me Now"	April 27, 2017	Thursdays; 8:00 p.m.	1.8/7	7.02	4	14	2
291	22	"Leave It Inside"	May 4, 2017	Thursdays; 8:00 p.m.	1.8/7	7.09	4	19	2
292	23	"True Colors"	May 11, 2017	Thursdays; 8:00 p.m.	1.8/7	7.02	4	18	2
293	24	"Ring of Fire"	May 18, 2017	Thursdays; 8:00 p.m.	2.0/8	7.92	3	10	2

=== Live + 7 Day (DVR) ratings ===
No. in series	No. in season	Episode	Air date	Time slot (EST)	18–49 increase	Viewers (millions) increase	Total 18-49	Total viewers (millions)	Ref
270	1	"Undo"	September 22, 2016	Thursdays; 8:00 p.m.	1.5	3.56	4.0	12.32	
271	2	"Catastrophe and the Cure"	September 29, 2016	Thursdays; 8:00 p.m.	1.6	3.71	4.0	12.13	
272	3	"I Ain't No Miracle Worker"	October 6, 2016	Thursdays; 8:00 p.m.	1.5	3.77	3.8	11.87	
273	4	"Falling Slowly"	October 13, 2016	Thursdays; 8:00 p.m.	1.6	3.79	3.7	11.59	
274	5	"Both Sides Now"	October 20, 2016	Thursdays; 8:00 p.m.	1.6	3.51	3.7	11.69	
275	6	"Roar"	October 20, 2016	Thursdays; 8:00 p.m.	1.6	3.51	3.7	11.69	
276	7	"Why Try to Change Me Now"	November 3, 2016	Thursdays; 8:00 p.m.	1.3	3.19	3.4	10.79	
277	8	"The Room Where It Happens"	November 10, 2016	Thursdays; 8:00 p.m.	1.4	3.32	3.3	10.57	
278	9	"You Haven't Done Nothin'"	November 17, 2016	Thursdays; 8:00 p.m.	1.4	3.40	3.6	11.45	
279	10	"You Can Look (But You'd Better Not Touch)"	January 26, 2017	Thursdays; 8:00 p.m.	1.5	3.39	4.1	12.98	
280	11	"Jukebox Hero"	February 2, 2017	Thursdays; 8:00 p.m.	1.3	3.34	3.6	11.84	
281	12	"None of Your Business"	February 9, 2017	Thursdays; 8:00 p.m.	1.4	3.20	3.5	11.67	
282	13	"It Only Gets Much Worse"	February 16, 2017	Thursdays; 8:00 p.m.	1.3	3.26	3.4	10.94	
283	14	"Back Where You Belong"	February 23, 2017	Thursdays; 8:00 p.m.	1.4	3.39	3.4	11.11	
284	15	"Civil War"	March 9, 2017	Thursdays; 8:00 p.m.	1.6	3.64	3.5	10.94	
285	16	"Who Is He (And What Is He to You)?"	March 16, 2017	Thursdays; 8:00 p.m.	1.5	3.34	3.5	11.25	
286	17	"'Till I Hear It From You"	March 23, 2017	Thursdays; 8:00 p.m.	1.3	3.18	3.2	10.99	
287	18	"Be Still, My Soul"	March 30, 2017	Thursdays; 8:00 p.m.	1.3	3.05	3.3	10.67	
288	19	"What's Inside"	April 6, 2017	Thursdays; 8:00 p.m.	1.3	3.14	3.0	10.44	
289	20	"In the Air Tonight"	April 13, 2017	Thursdays; 8:00 p.m.	1.3	3.18	3.1	10.37	
290	21	"Don't Stop Me Now"	April 27, 2017	Thursdays; 8:00 p.m.	—N/a	—N/a	—N/a	—N/a	—N/a
291	22	"Leave It Inside"	May 4, 2017	Thursdays; 8:00 p.m.	1.3	3.30	3.1	10.39	
292	23	"True Colors"	May 11, 2017	Thursdays; 8:00 p.m.	1.4	3.26	3.2	10.29	
293	24	"Ring of Fire"	May 18, 2017	Thursdays; 8:00 p.m.	1.3	3.09	3.3	11.01	

== DVD release ==
Grey's Anatomy: The Complete Thirteenth Season
Set Details		Special Features
24 Episodes; 6-Disc Set; English (Dolby Digital 5.1 Surround); Subtitles: English SDH, Spanish & French; Runtime: 1022 minutes		Deleted Scenes; In Stitches: Season Thirteen Outtakes
Release Dates
Region 1	Region 2	Region 4
August 29, 2017	October 23, 2017	October 18, 2017
