= Linda Klein =

American medical technical advisor

Linda Klein is a medical technical advisor for television shows and films. She is also an actress, producer, and executive producer for some of the shows she advises.

While working as an operating room nurse at St. John's Hospital in Santa Monica in the late'70s/early'80s, Klein learned that a neurosurgeon was writing an episode for Dynasty and had asked a nurse, a friend of Klein's, to be on the set. A Dynasty fan, Klein was excited to see the script at her friend’s house, and wanted to learn more. Her friend connected Klein with a medical technical advisor from Trapper John, M.D., who invited her to observe filming. Soon after she began working as a full time medical technical advisor on shows such as Matt Houston and Buck James, and later spent five years on Doogie Howser, M.D.

Klein would often participate in the show as an extra so she could be up close and ensure the scenes were staged properly. She made appearances as "Nurse Linda" on the show Nip/Tuck where she also consulted. Working on the show since its first episode, she began to have speaking lines in season five. She was the fourth person hired for Grey's Anatomy and helped to oversee approximately 1,300 medical procedures on the show, serving as executive producer as of 2025. She was also the one to recruit BokHee An to Grey's Anatomy. Other television shows where she had a role as a medical technical consultant include Chicago Hope, The Practice, 24, and Six Feet Under. Films include Vanilla Sky and Ocean's Eleven.
