= Stephanie Edwards (Grey's Anatomy) =

Dr. Stephanie Edwards
- Grey's Anatomy character
- The Season 12 Promotional Photo of Jerrika Hinton as Dr. Stephanie Edwards
- First appearance: Going, Going, Gone (9.01); September 27, 2012 (as recurring cast) "Seal Our Fate" (10.01); September 26, 2013 (as series regular)
- Last appearance: "Ring of Fire" (13.24); May 18, 2017
- Created by: Shonda Rhimes
- Portrayed by: Jerrika Hinton

In-universe information
- Full name: Stephanie Edwards
- Nicknames: Grumpy; Steph; Dr. Lavender
- Title: M.D.
- Significant others: Jackson Avery (ex-boyfriend); Kyle Diaz (ex-boyfriend; deceased)

Stephanie Edwards, M.D., is a fictional character from the medical drama television series Grey's Anatomy, which airs on the American Broadcasting Company (ABC) in the United States. The character was created by series producer Shonda Rhimes and portrayed by actress Jerrika Hinton from 2012 to 2017. Introduced as a surgical intern at the fictional Seattle Grace Mercy West Hospital, later renamed Grey Sloan Memorial Hospital, Stephanie works her way up to the resident level alongside fellow intern and friend, Jo Wilson (Camilla Luddington).

Jerrika Hinton described Stephanie as "innovative," someone who consistently strives to be the best. Key storylines involving Stephanie include the love rectangle between Jackson Avery (Jesse Williams), April Kepner (Sarah Drew) and Matthew Taylor (Justin Bruening), and herself. Additionally, her mentorship under neurosurgeon Amelia Shepherd (Caterina Scorsone), her friendship with Jo, her childhood illness, and her battles with professional burnout have been significant focal points of her character's development throughout the series.

== Background ==
Stephanie was born with sickle-cell disease. At the age of 5, she participated in a clinical trial at St. Jude Children's Research Hospital, which used bone marrow transplants to treat the disease. The treatment was highly effective for her, and Dr. Keith Wagner, who led the study, considered Stephanie one of its most successful cases. However, her memory of the trial is marked by resistance and being told it was for her own good. There were times when she had to be physically restrained to receive the treatment, and she cried every day, becoming deeply depressed.

As a result of this challenging and traumatic experience, Stephanie felt she had missed out on a normal childhood, which led her to immerse herself in books as a form of escape. This passion for learning eventually inspired her to pursue a career in medicine. In high school, she excelled in extracurricular activities, becoming the cheerleading captain and leading her team to victory. Stephanie earned a college scholarship through cheerleading.

== Storylines ==
Stephanie begins her surgical internship at Seattle Grace Mercy West after the plane crash along with Jo Wilson (Camilla Luddington), Leah Murphy (Tessa Ferrer), Shane Ross (Gaius Charles) and Heather Brooks (Tina Majorino). Early in her internship, she and her fellow interns fear Meredith Grey (Ellen Pompeo), nicknaming her "Medusa". While working on a case under Cristina Yang (Sandra Oh), Stephanie impresses Cristina, who lets her perform a procedure despite Miranda Bailey's (Chandra Wilson) objections. However, a rivalry with Leah leads to a serious mistake when Leah hooks a patient's oxygen up to their IV, resulting in both being banned from the OR indefinitely. When the hospital faces a potential sale, Stephanie contemplates transferring to another program, as she wants to be the best and learn at the best hospital.

In Season 10, following the death of Heather, Stephanie is given time off to grieve. She also undergoes LASIK surgery to eliminate her need for glasses. She participates in Meredith's portal vein trial but gets on Meredith's bad side when she sides with Alex Karev (Justin Chambers) during a surgery. Stephanie attends April Kepner's (Sarah Drew) wedding to Matthew Taylor (Justin Bruening), where she suspects unresolved feelings between Jackson Avery (Jesse Williams) and April. Her suspicion is confirmed when Jackson interrupts the ceremony to declare his love for April, humiliating Stephanie. Jackson later apologizes, but their relationship ends.

In her work with Bailey, Stephanie is involved in a groundbreaking case using deactivated HIV to treat a patient with SCID. When the patient's mother revokes consent for the procedure, Bailey secretly proceeds anyway. Stephanie confronts Bailey, and after legal trouble arises, Stephanie takes the blame to protect Bailey, resulting in her suspension for a week.

In Season 11, Stephanie becomes highly interested in neurosurgery and forms a mentor-mentee relationship with Amelia Shepherd (Caterina Scorsone). Together, they tackle the removal of a seemingly inoperable tumor from Dr. Nicole Herman (Geena Davis), and though they succeed, Herman is left blind after a stroke. Amelia reassures Stephanie, telling her to focus on the victory of beating the impossible.

In Season 12, Stephanie helps a patient recover from brain surgery, bringing up painful memories of her childhood as a sickle-cell disease trial participant. When Jo accuses Stephanie of lying about her illness, Stephanie confronts her at Meredith's party, calling out Jo for her insecurities. Stephanie also enters a romantic relationship with a patient, Kyle Diaz (Wilmer Valderrama), but ends it when their relationship interferes with her work. After Kyle returns to the hospital and refuses to involve her in his care, Stephanie is devastated when he dies during surgery.

In Season 13, Stephanie is surprised by Leah's return to Grey Sloan Memorial, after having been fired in the Season 10 finale. She also clashes with religious parents who refuse treatment for their child, leading her to lose her temper and throw a tablet at the wall, which results in Eliza Minnick (Marika Dominczyk) revoking her OR privileges and sending her to therapy. Later, Stephanie becomes a hostage to a dangerous patient named Keith, who attempts to escape the hospital by setting a fire. In a tense standoff, Stephanie douses him in alcohol and sets him on fire, but the subsequent explosion leaves her with severe burns. Despite her injuries, she manages to save a young girl named Erin and escapes the fire. After recovering, Stephanie decides to leave the hospital to travel and explore the world outside of medicine, thanking Richard Webber (James Pickens Jr.) for changing her life. She realizes she needs a break from the hospital, which has consumed her entire life.

== Development ==
=== Casting & creation ===
Hinton was cast in 2012 for the role of Stephanie Edwards. The initial script read-through for the episode featuring her character took place on July 16, 2012. In 2016, Hinton was set to leave the show to star in an ABC pilot series Toast, but when the pilot was passed on, she returned as a series regular for Season 13. On January 31, 2017, it was announced that Hinton would depart from Grey's Anatomy at the end of the thirteenth season, having been cast in Alan Ball's new HBO series Here and Now.

=== Characterization ===
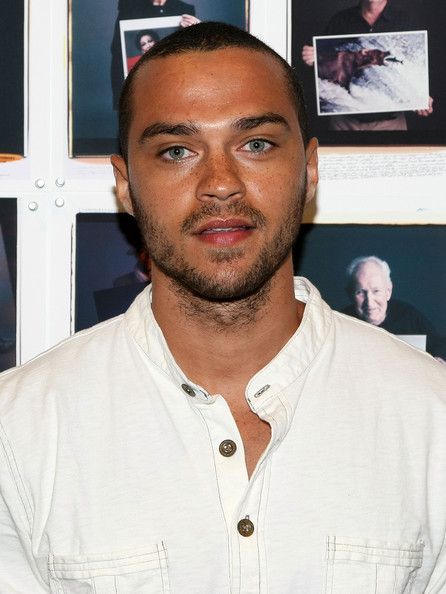
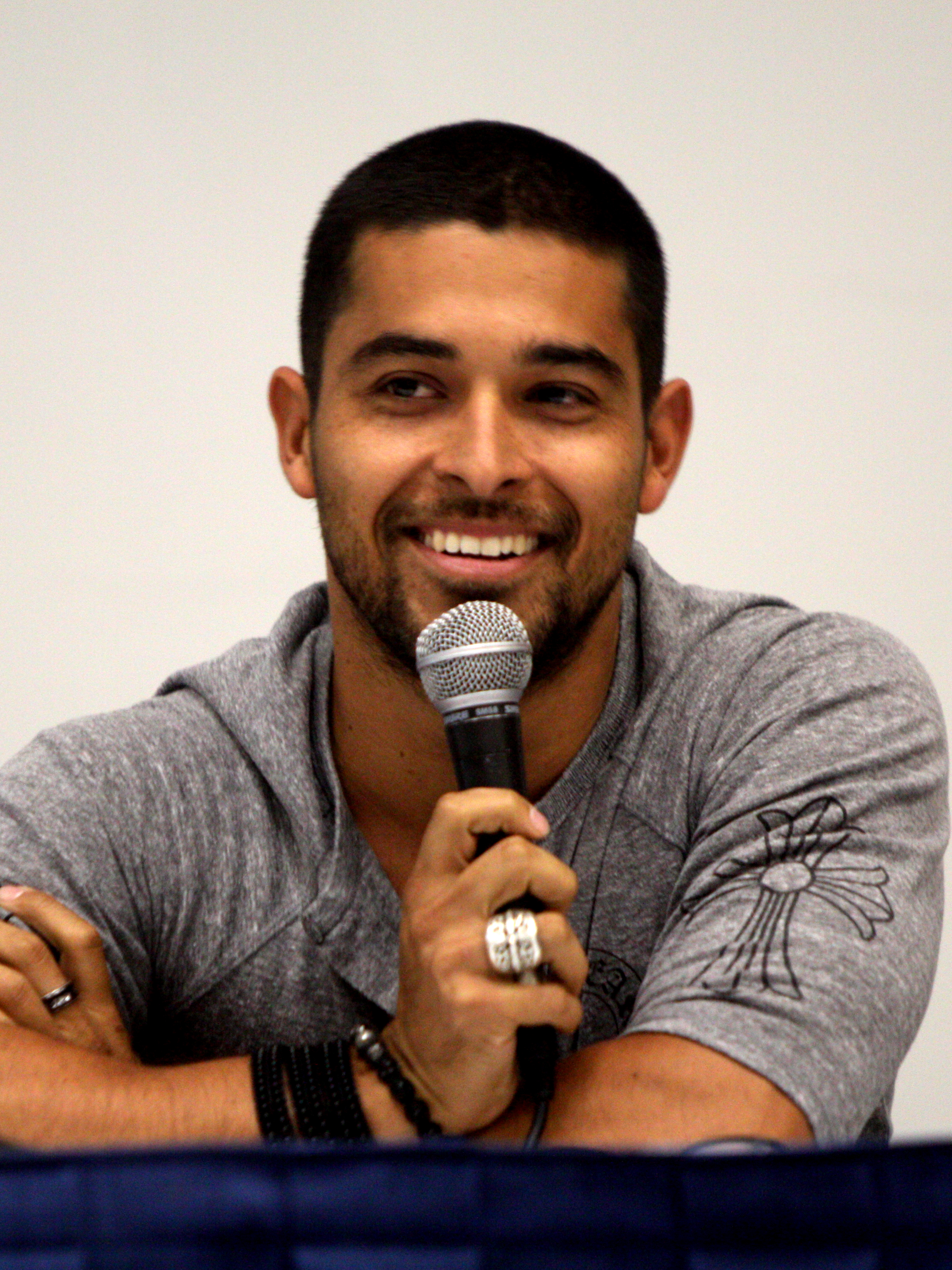
Jesse Williams's (left) and Wilmer Valderrama's (right) characters both had short-lived relationships with Edwards.

After Jackson Avery (Jesse Williams) professes his love for April Kepner (Sarah Drew) at her wedding to Matthew Taylor (Justin Bruening) while sitting next to Stephanie, Hinton described the moment as the "worst kind of betrayal". She elaborated, saying, “It’s one thing to say, ‘I’ve been harboring these feelings and I thought I dealt with them but I haven’t and I’m actually involving you in this decision.’ But it’s another thing to devastate someone in such a public way in front of people that she has to work with the very next day."

Hinton expressed her excitement about being part of the storyline involving Dr. Nicole Herman's (Geena Davis) tumor with her character’s neurosurgeon mentor, Amelia Shepherd (Caterina Scorsone) in Season 11. Hinton said, "It's been a while since I've been this excited because playing the jilted lover, that was something, but now I get to sink my teeth into something! And I love when I get to do research, and the things that Stephanie is involved with now… somehow or another Grey Sloan is always the place with groundbreaking medical discoveries." Reflecting on Stephanie's journey in her first three years, Hinton added, "She got to be a part of Meredith Grey's (Ellen Pompeo) 3D printing lab, she got to be a part of Miranda Bailey's (Chandra Wilson) genome project, and now she's going to get to be a part of this third gigantic thing."

Hinton spoke to The Hollywood Reporter about Stephanie's relationship with Kyle (Wilmer Valderrama) in Season 12. On Stephanie's decision to end the relationship, Hinton explained, "She has to let it go and walk away because of the pure reality of the situation: Kyle came to her as a sick person, and while they were able to mitigate some of that, the circumstances of his illness mean that he will continue to deteriorate, which means he'll continue to require more care. For someone like Stephanie, who is so driven and so young, this is the logic of a younger person. She doesn't have the capacity to give Kyle what he needs." Hinton continued, "Even in this week's episode, we see Stephanie try: He's sick, and she brings him into the hospital and does the thing she knows how to do — medicine. She tries to do the thing she knows how to do, and she's stopped at every turn because her superior says she's too close to this case. 'This is personal, and you can't keep apart the personal and the professional here, so I'm moving you off this.' That's a devastating blow for someone who always thinks that she knows the right way." She emphasized how difficult it was for Stephanie to hear that she was not capable, calling it "devastating" for someone as confident and competent as her character. "That will continue to be the uphill battle she fights, both in trying to carve out her career aside from Kyle and even more so in the relationship with him. She's not capable of doing both; she just can't. So she chooses her career. Let’s also point out that it’s not like they’ve been dating for a year; they’ve been together for maybe six weeks. She’s considering every bit of reality at her disposal. And it’s not an easy decision.”

== Reception ==
After the airing of the ninth season of Grey's Anatomy, Natalie Abrams of TV Guide assessed the five new interns and whether they should remain on the show. Regarding Stephanie, Abrams concluded to "Keep her for now", while suggesting that Jo and Shane should be cut instead. Abrams remarked, "She has seamlessly been able to infiltrate the core group by... well, sleeping with one of them. Her fling with Jackson Avery (Jesse Williams) has been a fun storyline that recalls the early days when [Meredith and Cristina] were sleeping with their own attendings". Abrams also noted that while Stephanie could become "the other woman" in the Jackson-April storyline, this plot could provide a refreshing break from the season's focus on the hospital's sale.

In Season 12, Caroline Siede of The A.V. Club observed that Stephanie was "a bit un-moored" without a love interest or a trusted mentor and hoped this would allow her to "stir things up". Siede praised the breakup between Stephanie and Kyle Diaz (Wilmer Valderrama) in the episode “You’re Gonna Need Someone On Your Side”, especially Hinton's performance. Siede wrote, "In her final conversation with Jo, she explains that after spending so much time as a helpless patient when she was a kid, she took control of her life by forging a new identity as a doctor." Siede found the breakup unexpectedly moving and noted that "selling the audience on both a relationship and its breakup in one episode is an impressive feat" that Hinton pulled off. In the later episode “At Last”, Siede expressed disappointment that the relationship wasn’t explored more but appreciated the chemistry between the characters and the tragedy of Kyle’s death. She noted "the quiet dignity to Stephanie’s grief" that she looked forward to seeing Hinton explore.

Gwen Inhat, writing for The A.V. Club, praised Stephanie's actions in the penultimate episode "True Colors", questioning, "Is Stephanie alive or dead?" and noting that if she were to go down a hero, "that was an awesome way to go." Inhat also expressed that Hinton and her character would be missed. Lauren Hoffman of Cosmopolitan called the scenes involving Stephanie as a hostage "wildly over the top" but felt it was "the first time I've felt true, scary suspense during a Grey's episode in a really long time." Maggie Fremont of Vulture agreed, saying she shed "tears out of fear for Stephanie’s safety as Keith dragged her around a mystifyingly empty hospital."

In the Season 13 finale, Hinton made her final appearance as Edwards. Inhat of The A.V. Club assessed that her absence would be felt on the show. Maggie Fremont of Vulture echoed these sentiments, saying, "it’s tough to bid farewell to one of the show’s best characters, especially one who didn’t always get her due. Both Stephanie and Jerrika will be missed." Justin Kirkland for Entertainment Weekly stated, "Stephanie Edwards is possibly in the top three most tragic Grey’s Anatomy characters of all time", citing her heartbreak at Jackson’s wedding, her professional struggles, and her relationship with Kyle. He remarked, "Oh, Stephanie. You deserved better."

On a more critical note, Lauren Hoffman for Cosmopolitan felt that while she enjoyed Hinton’s performance, Stephanie was underutilized compared to earlier interns like Izzie and George. Hoffman observed that it was "hard to make a character you only really get to play every few weeks feel like yours", and understood why Hinton chose to move on. She referenced Stephanie’s childhood spent in hospitals due to sickle cell treatments as a compelling reason for her character to ultimately leave her job.
