= BokHee An =

South Korean-born American nurse and actress

- Born: 1939 (age 86–87); Chūseinan Province, then part of Korea, Empire of Japan (now South Chungcheong Province, South Korea)
- Occupations: Nurse; Actress
- Known for: Longest-running recurring character actor on Grey's Anatomy

Korean name
- Hangul: 안복희
- RR: An Bokhui
- MR: An Pokhŭi

Kathy C. "BokHee" An (born 1939), born An BokHee (Korean: 안복희), is a Korean-born American nurse and actress most known for playing Nurse BokHee, the longest running recurring character on the television show Grey's Anatomy. She first appeared in Grey's Anatomy on the premiere episode, and has appeared in all 22 seasons so far. Prior to acting on the show, An was a surgical technologist. She was named to the Forbes 50 over 50 in 2024 for her work on Grey's Anatomy.

== Early life ==
BokHee An was born in 1939 in a small town in Chūseinan Province during the Japanese occupation of Korea, and came from a wealthy family who pressured her to follow the stereotypical path of a Korean woman. Instead, she went to Seoul at the age of 17 to study, and at 20 became an assistant to an OB-GYN. In 1968, she moved to California and changed her name to Kathy, but continued to be largely known as BokHee. In California, she worked night shifts at a surgical floor and babysat for a plastic surgeon before taking a job as a surgical technologist at 32.

== Acting career ==
An was recruited to work as a medical consultant on shows to ensure accuracy, and made her debut in 1983 in Ryan's Four. Since then, she has appeared in more than 600 episodes and movies, often balancing her hospital shifts with her days on set. She has appeared in Chicago Hope, Doogie Howser, M.D., Vanilla Sky, Nip/Tuck and Family Ties.

She appeared in the very first episode of Grey's Anatomy as Nurse BokHee, and has since appeared in all 22 seasons and over 300 episodes, making her one of the longest-serving actors on Grey's Anatomy and her character the longest-serving supporting character. However, she has had very few lines in the show, and only one before Season 15.

An soon became a favorite of fans, and has over 600 thousand Instagram followers. Actress Sandra Oh, a colleague on Grey's Anatomy, has stated that she views An as a mother figure.

Outside of her on-screen role and her role as a consultant, many of the cast members of Grey's Anatomy have shadowed her during operations.

An was named to the Forbes 50 over 50, specifically on the Lifestyle list, in 2024 for her work on Grey's Anatomy.

In 2026, she confirmed that she would remain with the series after speculation regarding her departure.

== Activism ==
An has been a vocal advocate in support of the Asian American and Pacific Islander (AAPI) community, advocating against racism, and addressing anti-Asian racism in one of her rare speaking lines, saying "We are American. Your face is American." to Lynn Chen's character.

== Personal life ==
She enjoys playing the traditional Korean musical instrument gayageum, and often posts pictures of herself playing.

== TV and film roles ==
Year	Title	Role	Notes / Ref.
1989	Doogie Howser, M.D.	Scrub Nurse (uncredited)	Episode: "A Stitch Called Wanda"
2005-present	Grey's Anatomy	Nurse Bokhee	300+ Episodes
2012	Private Practice	Nurse Bokhee(uncredited)	Episode: "You Break My Heart"
2018	Grey's Anatomy: B-Team	Nurse Bokhee(uncredited)	1 Episode
