= Jackson Avery =

Fictional character

- Grey's Anatomy character
- The Season 9 promotional photo of Jesse Williams as Dr. Jackson Avery
- First appearance: "Invasion" (6.05); October 15, 2009 (as recurring cast) "With You I'm Born Again" (7.01); September 23, 2010 (as series regular)
- Last appearance: "Someone Saved My Life Tonight" (17.17); June 3, 2021 (as main cast) "Goodbye Horses" (22.04); October 30, 2025 (as guest cast)
- Created by: Shonda Rhimes
- Portrayed by: Jesse Williams
- Season(s): 6 – 19, 21 – 22

In-universe information
- Title(s): Head of Plastic Surgery; M.D. F.A.C.S.
- Occupation: Attending plastic surgeon and ENT; Board Chairman of Grey Sloan Memorial Hospital
- Family: Robert Avery (father); Catherine Fox (mother); Richard Webber (stepfather); Maggie Pierce (stepsister); Harper Avery (grandfather; deceased)
- Spouses: April Kepner (m. 2013; div. 2016; reconciled)
- Significant others: Lexie Grey (ex-girlfriend; deceased); Stephanie Edwards (ex-girlfriend); Mara Keaton (ex-girlfriend); Priya (ex-girlfriend); Maggie Pierce (ex-girlfriend); Victoria Hughes (ex-girlfriend); Jo Wilson (ex-affair, Friends with benefits)
- Children: Samuel Norbert Avery (deceased); Harriet Kepner-Avery
- Born: 1982

Jackson Avery, M.D., F.A.C.S., is a fictional character from the ABC medical drama Grey's Anatomy. The character was created by series producer Shonda Rhimes, and is portrayed by Jesse Williams. He was introduced in the season 6 episode "Invasion" as a surgical resident formerly from Mercy West Medical Center, following its merger with Seattle Grace Hospital.

Williams initially appeared as a recurring cast member and was later promoted to series regular in Season 7. Jackson's main storyline involves his efforts to achieve success on his own merit, rather than relying on the legacy of his renowned surgeon grandfather. He specializes in plastic surgery after working with chief Mark Sloan (Eric Dane) in Season 7 and later becomes the chief of the department himself.

Jackson had a series of romantic relationships with several characters, including Lexie Grey (Chyler Leigh), April Kepner (Sarah Drew), Stephanie Edwards (Jerrika Hinton), Maggie Pierce (Kelly McCreary), Victoria Hughes, Jo Wilson (Camilla Luddington), and April Kepner (again).

Jackson married Kepner and had two children: a son, Samuel, who died of osteogenesis imperfecta type II, and a daughter named Harriet. He left Seattle with his former spouse April to run the Catherine Fox Foundation. In the show's 400th episode, Jackson returned to Seattle, where it was revealed that he and April had rekindled their romantic relationship while living in Boston.

== Storylines ==
Jackson Avery is the grandson of Harper Avery, one of the most famous surgeons in the country and the namesake of the prestigious Harper Avery Award. The younger Avery grew up hearing at his grandmother's dinner table about the nobility of being a surgeon, which inspired him to pursue that career. His father, Robert (Eric Roberts), "ran off to God knows where because he couldn't stand the pressure of being an Avery", and his mother, Catherine nee Fox (Debbie Allen), raised him alone. He says that in his family, he was identified as "just the pretty one" and they never pushed him academically, so he pushed himself. Jackson is initially a surgical resident at Mercy West Hospital. Alongside April Kepner (Sarah Drew), Reed Adamson (Nora Zehetner), and Charles Percy (Robert Baker), he joins the staff at Seattle Grace Mercy West after the institutions are merged. His grandfather Harper Avery is affiliated with Harvard and has to be treated at the hospital; during this period, he tries to convince his grandson to transfer to Massachusetts General Hospital, which he can arrange, but the younger Avery refuses.

In the aftermath of a mass shooting at SGMW, in which 11 people are killed, Avery suffers PTSD. For comfort, he and Kepner both take rooms in the large house of fellow resident Meredith Grey (Ellen Pompeo). Also living there are her husband, Derek Shepherd (Patrick Dempsey), resident Alex Karev (Justin Chambers) and intern Lexie Grey (Chyler Leigh), her half-sister. For some time, Avery suffers because of the death of his friend Percy in the shooting, and having assisted in surgery on Shepherd while being threatened at gunpoint by the shooter. The seventh season shows Avery's emerging interest in Meredith's sister, Lexie Grey, and they start a relationship. Avery also starts working with chief of plastic surgery Mark Sloan (Eric Dane), who had previously had a relationship with Lexie. She is discomfited by the two men working together and, when she later shows that she still has feelings for Sloan, Avery breaks up with her.

As the end of the fifth year of residency is near, the surgical residents, including Avery, prepare for their board certifications as they prepare for fellowships. The night before taking the exam, Jackson and April have sexual intercourse. However, Kepner is a virgin and regrets having broken her promise to Jesus to stay a virgin until marriage; the two have sex again during the period of the exams. During the exam, Avery is supported by his mother, Catherine, who happens to be a tester at the exams.

Avery, Meredith, Cristina Yang (Sandra Oh), and Alex eventually pass their boards, while Kepner fails. Although Avery has true feelings for her, she pushes him away because she believes that he feels guilty for having sex with her. In the Season 8 finale, Avery reveals to April that he is taking the position at Tulane Medical Center, despite feeling sick for leaving Seattle Grace Mercy West and her behind. As a celebration of the conclusion of their residencies, the former chief of surgery Richard Webber (James Pickens, Jr.) organizes his annual dinner for them. The eighth season ends with Avery, Karev, Kepner, and Webber waiting for Meredith and Yang. They are victims of an aviation accident in which Lexie, and eventually Mark die of their injuries.

After the accident, Avery stays at Seattle Grace and continues his work in plastic surgery. He and Kepner continue a sexual relationship, although April is uneasy and believes she is pregnant. When she tells Avery, he proposes to her and she accepts, anticipating a happy wedding. But the pregnancy is false and the couple break up before announcing their engagement to the staff. As a means to avoid each other, the two doctors decide to each bring a date to Dr. Miranda Bailey's (Chandra Wilson) wedding, both of whom are interns.

After the wedding, Avery has sex in his car with his date, intern Stephanie Edwards (Jerrika Hinton). Shortly afterwards he tells Kepner about the incident, and she thanks him for his honesty. It is hinted that Avery still loves Kepner when she turns to him for dating advice and he shows jealousy. They re-establish a friendship. When the hospital faces a financial crisis, Avery's mother, Catherine, agrees to invest in the hospital via the Harper Avery foundation; but she insists that Avery be made chairman. The board (at Avery's suggestion) later renames the hospital as Grey Sloan Memorial Hospital. Kepner gets engaged to Matthew but at their wedding, Avery stands up to profess his love for her.

Kepner chooses Avery, and they run out of her wedding together. When Kepner regrets her decision, Avery proposes to her and they elope. They keep their marriage a secret from the rest of the hospital staff, because of a new rule restricting relations among the staff. Avery's ex-girlfriend Stephanie feels especially betrayed because of how he left her. Catherine Avery is not happy about her son's eloping with Kepner, as he failed to make a prenuptial agreement to protect the Avery family fortune. They make up after Kepner signs such an agreement.

Jackson and April soon hit a rough patch when they realize that they have different views about the way their children should be raised with respect to religion. Soon after their fight, April realizes she is pregnant. April and Jackson's baby is diagnosed during pregnancy with osteogenesis imperfecta type II, and they learn that the baby will not survive long after birth. Jackson believes that termination is the best option; however, April would rather give birth to the baby, knowing it will not live very long. They schedule an induction for the next day, and at the beginning of the appointment, they are asked to sign their baby's death certificate, which is too hard for the couple to bear. April does not sign the papers and returns to work the same day praying for a miracle, while at work she has a heart-to-heart with a lady who lost her fiancée the night before. They decide to give birth to the baby via induction at 24 weeks gestation, having it baptized right then. She gives birth to Samuel Norbert Avery and he passes away shortly after birth.

In the Season 11 finale, Kepner tells Avery that she is leaving with Owen Hunt (Kevin McKidd) to serve as a trauma surgeon in the Army; it will help her grieve for their son. Avery lets her go and wonders how he can deal with his own grief. After discussions over the phone via FaceTime, Kepner tells Avery that she is extending her service time. The sound of gunfire and explosions are heard at April's base camp, leaving her to quickly terminate the call. On Valentine's Day, Kepner returns to the hospital, where she and Avery embrace in the foyer.

In Season 12, their marriage begins to fall apart and they grow estranged. In episode 11, they file for a civil divorce. After their divorce is completed, Kepner reveals that she is pregnant with Avery's child. In Season 14, Jackson begins a relationship with Maggie Pierce (Kelly McCreary), but by Season 16, they break up. Soon after Jackson begins a short-lived relationship with Victoria Hughes of Station 19, though that ends as well. In Season 17, Jackson begins a friends with benefits relationship with Jo, though, towards the end of the season, Jackson realizes he wants to leave the hospital and take over the Harper Avery Foundation in Boston. He approaches April with the idea, and the two decide to move to Boston together with Harriet with the possibility of reconciliation.

On the show's 400th episode in Season 18, Jackson and April return to Seattle with Harriet. It is revealed that they reconciled while living in Boston. In Season 19, Meredith visits Jackson in Boston where the two of them discuss her growing desire to cure Alzheimer's. He assures Meredith that she will have unlimited resources at his hospital, should she decide to accept a position there and move to Boston, which she ultimately does.

== Development ==
=== Casting & creation ===
In February 2009, Michael Ausiello hinted at the possibility of central character Meredith Grey (Ellen Pompeo) having another sibling. The series had released a casting call for an actor who could pass as biracial, though the casting was postponed until Season 6. Jesse Williams's casting was announced in late August 2009. Although his character's name was not initially revealed, his arc was expected to last several episodes. Williams described his audition process as "simple". He received the casting information on his birthday, August 5, and went in the next day to audition for the role, despite not knowing what character he was reading for. A week later, Williams learned he had gotten the job.

In late 2009, a casting call for a young Ellis Grey (Kate Burton) and a young Richard Webber (James Pickens Jr.), who were to appear in flashbacks, fueled rumors that Avery might be Meredith's half-brother. However, Williams later shot down the rumor, noting that Meredith would have noticed if her mother were pregnant. Matt Webb Mitovich noted Williams's absence from the Seattle Grace: On Call webseries as a sign of bigger plans for the character.

In the episode "Perfect Little Accident", which premiered on March 4, 2010, Avery is revealed to be the grandson of the legendary Harper Avery (Chelcie Ross). Shonda Rhimes hinted at the possibility of Williams and his co-star Sarah Drew, who portrays April Kepner, becoming series regulars in her blog post about the season finale in May 2010. Williams's promotion to series regular was eventually confirmed in June 2010.

=== Characterization ===
The character's profile on the official ABC website describes Avery as "hardworking, driven, observant", and "eager". However, at times, Avery can be too confident, "overly competitive", and very "stubborn". He has a habit of teasing his coworkers. Jesse Williams revealed to Essence.com that his character is very "ambitious" and doesn’t take sides or get involved in drama. "He's there to work and not really get involved in the pettiness", Williams noted. He describes the character as much more "cavalier" and bold.

Matt Webb Mitovich described Jackson as having a "sense of entitlement", while Williams described Jackson's demeanor as "swagger." In the highly competitive work environment of Seattle Grace, Avery acts as if he belongs and refuses to second-guess himself. Upon his arrival at Seattle Grace, Jackson is portrayed as a "kind of a wise-ass surgeon." He feels like an "invader" in the new team and decides to deal with it aggressively, showing his personality. "He is very confident and likes to say what is on his mind", Williams explained.

Williams also commented, "Jackson is more of a lone wolf. He's not really built to go seek support and a shoulder to cry on." He added that Jackson has always been trying to make it on his own: "Jackson doesn't want to live off his legacy and his name, which also conflicts with his desire to be close to his mother."

=== Relationships ===
Jackson immediately clashes with Cristina Yang (Sandra Oh) due to their competitive natures. The immediate tension between the duo leads to speculation about a potential romance. Yang and Avery compete for the same cases, and in the episode "Invest in Love", Jackson witnesses Cristina taking charge of a situation for the first time, and he admires her, seeing her differently. At a party, when Jackson is a bit drunk, he opens up about how attractive he finds Cristina and kisses her. Unaware of Yang's relationship with Owen Hunt (Kevin McKidd), the attraction feels natural to Jackson. Jesse Williams did not worry about fans hating his character for this, understanding that fans were not really supposed to like the Mercy Westers; Jackson was part of the "enemy camp" and had to "take his lumps." Williams described the kiss as a "pretty relatable crime of passion". The kiss does not have any immediate effects on Owen and Cristina's relationship and remains secret. Over time, Jackson and Cristina develop a mutual understanding, as they push one another to be better.

Speaking about Jackson's past relationship with Lexie Grey (Chyler Leigh), Williams said: "He tried to be safe and wise, avoiding romantic entanglements when he first transitioned into Seattle Grace from Mercy West. He focused on his work and didn’t get caught up in the drama of relationships. But he couldn’t help himself with Lexie once they got close; he really fell for her. He made himself vulnerable to perhaps the least available person in the hospital, knowing about her longstanding relationship with Mark Sloan (Eric Dane). He knew he shouldn’t go in that direction, but he went against his better judgment and got burned for it." Williams added, "They are both kind of suckers for love [...] they both get caught up in their own momentum [...] Avery’s all about his job and pressure from his grandfather, but he gets bowled over by this platonic relationship and can’t help himself with Lexie."

By the end of the eighth season, April and Jackson’s friendship evolves into an intimate relationship: "I thought they were going to be able to walk the line of staying on the friendship side of things. What they had was really unique and organic in the world of Grey’s Anatomy – two genders in a completely platonic, wholesome, pleasant, and productive friendship. Who’s to say that had to end?" In the ninth season, Jackson began a relationship with intern Stephanie Edwards (Jerrika Hinton). Williams remarked that it was a "fun, light, and no-strings-attached" relationship: "She’s sweet. She’s funny. They aren’t bogged down by big notions of each other."

Later, Jackson declares his love for April at her wedding to EMT Matthew Taylor (Justin Bruening). They get married and have a child together, but the baby dies shortly after birth due to a rare condition. Struggling with grief, April seeks solace by joining the army and goes on tour with Owen, leaving Jackson at Grey-Sloan Memorial. After several extended leaves, Jackson gives April an ultimatum, stating that if she doesn’t return to Seattle immediately, their relationship will end. April doesn’t return immediately, and when she does, Jackson feels she doesn’t respect his needs, especially after losing their child. Despite attempts to reconcile, they decide to end their marriage. April discovers she is pregnant on the day of their divorce proceedings but does not disclose this until after the papers are signed.

In Season 14, Jackson begins a relationship with Maggie Pierce (Kelly McCreary), which deepens throughout Season 15. The couple moves in together but decides to end things after a disagreement during a camping trip. Jackson then has a brief relationship with Victoria Hughes (from Station 19) and a "friends with benefits" arrangement with Jo Wilson (Camilla Luddington) during the COVID-19 lockdown.

When Jackson leaves Boston (and the show) at the end of Season 17, he is unattached but departs with his ex-wife, April, and their daughter, Harriet, suggesting a potential reunion. In the show’s 400th episode, Jackson and April return to Seattle for business and to visit his mother, who is battling cancer. At the end of the episode, the couple shares an embrace and a kiss in the elevator, indicating that they have rekindled their romance while living in Boston.

== Reception ==
Margaret Lyons of Entertainment Weekly wrote that the addition of Avery's character was one of the 10 reasons she loves Grey's Anatomy again: "Dr. Avery wasn't quite clicking as part of the ensemble when Jesse Williams first joined the cast. But now? Oh, mama. He's flirty — to a fault — but he's also a decent dude, and the show was in need of a seriously single male character." His bromance with mentor Mark Sloan (Eric Dane) has been positively received. Janalen Samson of BuddyTV commented: "These scenes with Jesse Williams are proving to be gems. I do love a good bromance, and these two actors are bringing the love and the funny in spades." The pairing was included in Zap2it's 25 Top Bromances of 2012.

Reviewing the first part of Season 9, Lyons remarked: "Avery's mom is more interesting than he is". Jackson was also listed in Wetpaint's "10 Hottest Male Doctors on TV".
