= Jerrika Hinton =

American actress

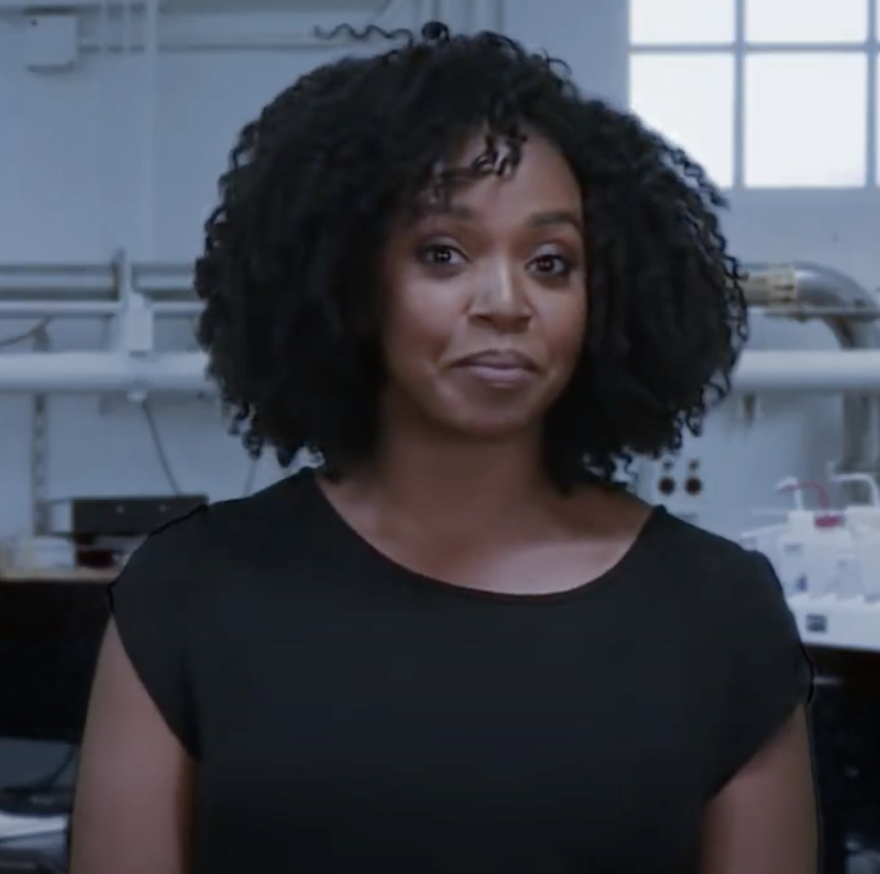
- Hinton in a 2018 video by NASA's Universe of Learning
- Born: Dallas, Texas, U.S.
- Education: Southern Methodist University (BFA)
- Occupation: Actress
- Years active: 2005–present

Jerrika Hinton is an American actress, best known for her role as Dr. Stephanie Edwards in the ABC medical drama series Grey's Anatomy.

== Early life and education ==
Hinton was born and raised in Oak Cliff, Dallas, Texas, the daughter of Cynthia, a retired government worker, and Avaleon Hinton.

She graduated in 2002 with honors from Southern Methodist University's Meadows School of the Arts with a Bachelor of Fine Arts degree in theatre, studying directing and playwriting.

== Career ==
Hinton began her career appearing in stage productions. She has made her film debut in the 2006 independent drama Rain. The following years, Hinton guest-starred in several television series such as Gilmore Girls, Everybody Hates Chris, Zoey 101, Ghost Whisperer, Gossip Girl, Lie to Me, Bones, and Scandal. In 2008 she did a Hanes commercial with Sarah Chalke. Other film credits include Broken Angel (2008) and The Roommate (2011), and well as Ion Television movie A Christmas Kiss (2011).

In September 2012, it was announced that Hinton had been cast as new intern Stephanie Edwards for ninth season of Shonda Rhimes medical drama series Grey's Anatomy.

In January 2013, it was announced that Hinton along with other newcomers to the show were given the option to become series regulars if Grey's Anatomy were to be renewed. After three seasons as regular cast member on show, Shonda Rhimes cast Hinton as the lead character of her first comedy pilot Toast in March 2016. She would still be on Grey's Anatomy if her pilot had gone to series. The pilot was not ordered to series. In January 2017, it was announced that Hinton would co-star opposite Holly Hunter in Here and Now, a HBO drama series created by Alan Ball. She portrayed Ashley Collins, one of the adopted children of Hunter's character. She next played Natalie Gorman in Servant (2019–2020) and began portraying Millie Morris in the Amazon Prime series Hunters in 2020 and 2023.

== Filmography ==
=== Film ===
Year	Title	Role	Notes
2005	Foreign Soil	Natalie	
2006	Rain	Beni Arnold	
2008	Broken Angel	Officer Raines	
2011	The Roommate	Shiana	
2012	The Strangely Normal	Black Friend	Short
2014	Teacher of the Year	Mrs. Curtis	
2015	Just Another Dance with My Father	Katie	Short
2016	Odious	Sharlette	
2024	The Piano Lesson	Grace	
2024	Mr. Crocket	Summer	Hulu

=== Television ===
Year	Title	Role	Notes
2006	Gilmore Girls	Allison	Episode: "Super Cool Party People"
2006	Everybody Hates Chris	Birthday Girl	Episode: "Everybody Hates Rejection"
2007	Zoey 101	Claire Jeffries	Episode: "Son of a Dean"
2008	Ghost Whisperer	Clerk	Episode: "Ball & Chain"
2009	Gossip Girl	Waitress	Episode: "Valley Girls"
2010	Lie to Me	Robin	Episode: "Bullet Bump"
2010	Better with You	Saleswoman	Episode: "Pilot"
2010	Terriers	Didi	Episode: "Missing Persons"
2011	Mad Love	Eva	Episode: "Fireworks"
2011	Bones	Nadine Tweed	Episode: "The Truth in the Myth"
2011	Consequences	Tamika	Episode: "Monisa"
2011	A Christmas Kiss	Tressa	TV movie
2012	Scandal	Hannah	Episode: "Hell Hath No Fury"
2012	The Book Club	Jerrika / Cobra Chai	Episodes: "All Valley" and "The Warrior Reads On"
2012–2017	Grey's Anatomy	Dr. Stephanie Edwards	Recurring cast: season 9, main cast: season 10–13
2016	Send Me: An Original Web Series	Heather	Recurring cast
2017	Flip the Script	The Lit Agent	Episode: "Market Value"
2018	Here and Now	Ashley Collins	Main cast
2018	Doxxed	Liddie	TV movie
2018	A Majestic Christmas	Nell	TV movie
2019	Doxxed	Liddie	Recurring cast
2019–2021	Servant	Natalie Gorman	Recurring cast: season 1-2
2020; 2023	Hunters	Millie Morris	Main cast
2024	A Man in Full	Henrietta White	5 episodes
