= Sadie Harris =

Fictional character from Grey's Anatomy

- Grey's Anatomy character
- Melissa George as Dr. Sadie Harris
- First appearance: "These Ties That Bind"; 5×08, November 13, 2008
- Last appearance: "Before And After"; 5×15, February 12, 2009
- Created by: Shonda Rhimes
- Portrayed by: Melissa George

In-universe information
- Alias: Die
- Nicknames: Pre-Cristina Cristina, Die
- Title: M.D.

Sadie Harris, M.D. is a fictional character from the medical drama television series Grey's Anatomy, which airs on the American Broadcasting Company (ABC) in the United States. The character was created by series producer Shonda Rhimes and portrayed by actress Melissa George. Introduced as a surgical intern with a longstanding friendship with the series' protagonist Meredith Grey (Ellen Pompeo), Sadie forms a bond with Lexie Grey (Chyler Leigh) but departs after it is revealed she cheated her way into the surgical program.

George was invited to meet with Grey's Anatomy's executive producers after the show's casting agents saw her performance in the 2008 television drama In Treatment. Initially, the actress' contract spanned 8 to 11 recurring episodes in Season 5, with the possibility of becoming a series regular. Sadie was originally intended to be a romantic interest for Callie Torres (Sara Ramirez) and Erica Hahn (Brooke Smith), but the role was retooled following Hahn's departure in November 2008.

There was speculation as to whether Sadie Harris would become a series regular, but it was later confirmed that Melissa George's character would not remain on the show and would soon depart. George explained that it was her own decision to leave Grey's Anatomy, dismissing claims that her departure was part of an effort to "de-gay" the series. The character received mixed feedback from critics and has been described as "naughty," "mischievous," and "nutty".

== Storylines ==
Sadie Harris first appears in the Season 5 episode "These Ties That Bind", where it is revealed that she was once a very close friend of Meredith Grey (Ellen Pompeo). During a vacation in Europe, Harris and Meredith gave each other nicknames: "Die" and "Death", respectively. Cristina Yang (Sandra Oh), Meredith's best friend, becomes jealous of their rekindled friendship when Harris arrives at Seattle Grace Hospital as a surgical intern. Harris quickly forms a bond with fellow intern Lexie Grey (Chyler Leigh), Meredith's half-sister.

In her frustration over the lack of surgical opportunities, Harris makes reckless decisions, including cutting her own shoulder to allow the other interns to practice stitching it back together. Later, she volunteers for an appendectomy, intending to help the interns learn the procedure, on the condition that she gets to perform one afterward. However, the interns make a mistake during the surgery, putting Harris in serious danger before she is rescued by the residents. The incident results in the interns being placed on probation, and though Meredith Grey rebukes them, Harris remains unapologetic, telling Lexie she stands by her choices.

Harris takes responsibility for the surgery debacle when she approaches Chief of Surgery Richard Webber (James Pickens Jr.), revealing that the only reason she wasn't fired was due to Webber's friendship with her father. Although the show briefly hints at a potential romantic connection between Harris and Callie Torres (Sara Ramirez), the relationship is never pursued. Harris continues to bond with Lexie, even helping her cover up her growing relationship with Mark Sloan (Eric Dane).

In the episode "Before and After", as the interns engage in a competition set up by Izzie Stevens (Katherine Heigl), George O'Malley (T. R. Knight) begins to notice Harris' lack of medical knowledge. He offers to tutor her, but she declines, choosing not to inform Webber of her inadequacies. O'Malley ultimately tells Webber, prompting a conversation that leads Harris to admit she cheated her way into the surgical program. She tells Meredith that she's decided to quit and suggests they return to their carefree days in Europe, but Meredith declines. Harris then departs from Seattle Grace, ending her short tenure at the hospital.

== Development ==
=== Casting and creation ===
Melissa George received an invitation to meet Grey's Anatomy's executive producers, Shonda Rhimes and Betsy Beers, after Grey's Anatomy's casting agents took notice of her recurring performances in the television drama In Treatment (2008). George explained that after her meeting with the producers, she was quickly set to begin working on the show.

George's initial contract included eight to eleven episodes with the possibility of becoming a series regular. However, according to George's representative, she only intended to appear in a maximum of 8 episodes. Her character, Sadie Harris, was originally intended to have a romance with Callie Torres (Sara Ramirez), but Rhimes later decided to change the storyline after George began filming. Harris was initially written as a lesbian character, but was later revised as bisexual.

In January 2009, George confirmed her departure from Grey's Anatomy, and multiple reasons were cited for her exit. George stated that she chose to leave to pursue other projects, and she offered praise for the show's cast members. However, a representative for the series explained that her departure resulted from a mutual agreement between the show and the actress, noting that her character's storyline had "come to a natural end", but added that everyone was disappointed with her exit.

After Erica Hahn (Brooke Smith) was written off the show, speculation arose that George's departure and the rewrite of Harris' storyline were part of an effort by the American Broadcasting Company (ABC) to "de-gay" Grey's Anatomy. E! Online's Kristin Dos Santos reported these claims, suggesting that ABC had influenced both Smith's dismissal and the changes to Harris' character arc. However, these assertions were refuted by Rhimes, who denied any such network interference.

=== Characterization ===
"I believe attraction shouldn't be gender specific and whether you're gay shouldn't be your first personality trait. Your sexuality is not entirely who you are, so first I was more concerned with getting to know Sadie. Being gay or not wasn't the issue. She has a lot going on and a lot of layers to uncover."

— George on her character's personality

George's character, Sadie Harris, has been described as "naughty," "mischievous," and "nutty". George added that Harris' sexuality is not the central aspect of her personality, calling her character "broken" and explaining that her outgoing persona serves to mask deeper emotional issues. She also revealed that her portrayal of Harris was influenced by Angelina Jolie's character, Lisa Rowe, in Girl, Interrupted (1999), known for her outspoken and sociopathic tendencies.

Peter Nowalk, one of the show's writers, characterized Harris as "quite a flirty gal". Several Grey's Anatomy cast members have also commented on Harris' character. Chandra Wilson stated that Harris is fast-paced, while Chyler Leigh noted that Harris seems to be on a mission to "wreak havoc on Seattle Grace".

Entertainment Weekly's Michael Ausiello referred to Harris as "an intern with an open mind towards sexuality". BuddyTV's Debbie Chang and Jonathan Toomey of The Huffington Post raised questions about Harris' self-harming behavior in the episode "In the Midnight Hour", wondering whether Harris "has a death wish" and questioning "what is wrong with her".

Stacy McKee, a primary writer for the show, described Harris as Meredith Grey's "pre-Cristina Cristina", meaning she shares a deep history with Meredith that predates and somewhat rivals her close bond with Cristina Yang.

== Reception ==
Throughout her run on Grey's Anatomy, the character received mixed feedback from critics.

Jon Caramanica of the Los Angeles Times was critical of her development, describing Melissa George as "woefully misused" in her role. Michael Idato, writing for The Age, described the storyline between Harris and Cristina Yang as "frosty," and characterized the writing as being in "true soap fashion".

In contrast, Darren Devlyn of the Herald Sun speculated that the producers brought in George to "shake up the show", noting similarities between Harris' bisexual storyline and that of Hahn's. Speaking of George's exit, Kris De Leon from BuddyTV commented that George departed on the "best of terms" compared to former cast members such as Isaiah Washington (Preston Burke), Smith, and Knight, all of whom had more "rocky" exits.

Erin McWhirter of The Daily Telegraph labeled George's character as "outrageous" following the self-performed appendectomy storyline. Former The Star-Ledger editor Alan Sepinwall was critical, sarcastically commenting on Harris' self-harm, writing: "Ooooh, she's damaged! And sexy! She takes off her top and then eagerly cuts herself for the other interns! That's hot!" Erin Lulevitch from TV Guide called Harris a "masochist" due to her self-incision.

However, Scott Ellis of The Sydney Morning Herald found Harris "intriguing", and Jennifer Armstrong of Entertainment Weekly enjoyed Harris' actions in the episode "Sympathy for the Devil", calling it "sweet" when she took the blame for causing Mark Sloan's penile fracture to save Lexie Grey from embarrassment. Debbie Chang of BuddyTV described Harris as "kind of a rebel", while Lauren Johnston of the Daily News referred to her personality as "brash".
