= What a Difference a Day Makes (Grey's Anatomy) =

- Grey's Anatomy episode
- An episodic screenshot displaying Stevens listening to Karev saying his wedding vows.
- Episode no.: Season 5 Episode 22
- Directed by: Rob Corn
- Written by: Shonda Rhimes
- Original air date: May 7, 2009

Guest appearance
- Jeffrey Dean Morgan as Denny Duquette

Episode chronology
← Previous "No Good at Saying Sorry (One More Chance)"	Next → "Here's to Future Days"
- Grey's Anatomy season 5

"What a Difference a Day Makes" is the twenty-second episode of the fifth season of the American television medical drama, Grey's Anatomy and the show's 100th episode overall. It is written by series creator Shonda Rhimes and directed by Rob Corn, the episode was originally broadcast on the American Broadcasting Company (ABC) in the United States on May 7, 2009.

Grey's Anatomy centers around a group of young doctors in training. In this episode, a wedding takes place. The episode received widespread critical acclaim, with Heigl and Chambers' performances receiving high praise. The initial airing was viewed by 15.326 million people and garnered a 5.3/14 Nielsen rating/share in the 18–49 demographic.

== Plot ==
The episode opens to a voice-over by Izzie Stevens (Katherine Heigl) about how life's biggest moments often come unexpectedly, shaping one's lives in profound ways.

Izzie is excited about the wedding of Meredith Grey (Ellen Pompeo) and Derek Shepherd (Patrick Dempsey), which she prepared and will take place at the end of the day. Stevens, who has been diagnosed with stage IV metastatic cancer in her brain and liver, has just undergone a surgery to remove a tumor. She however has hallucinations of Denny Duquette (Jeffrey Dean Morgan), her former deceased fiancé, which she knows means she has another tumor.

Meanwhile, Cristina Yang (Sandra Oh) and Owen Hunt (Kevin McKidd)'s relationship is still strained after Hunt's PTSD caused him to strangle Yang while they were sleeping. Callie Torres (Sara Ramirez) who has financial difficulties takes extra shifts. A group of college students who were going to their graduation arrives in the hospital following a car accident. Arizona Robbins (Jessica Capshaw) tries to know what went wrong the previous night during her date with Callie but she avoids the subject.

When Miranda Bailey (Chandra Wilson) and Derek cannot find any tumor in Izzie's brain from the MRI, they decide to map her brain while she hallucinates and they discover an inoperable tumor. Afterwards, Bailey has an idea and shares it with Derek. Meredith receives her first solo surgery as wedding gift from Derek. The colon surgery is overseen by Richard Webber (James Pickens, Jr.), which turns out to be successful. Derek tells her Bailey's idea. In the meantime, George O'Malley (T. R. Knight) is depressed when all his patients from the car accident die until Hunt tells him one case where he helped has survived.

Later on, Callie eventually confesses to Arizona why the date didn't go well: they went to an expensive restaurant that she couldn't afford because she has been disowned by her father and now she is broke. Arizona tells her they will stay in to eat and they reconcile.

Meredith tells Bailey and Derek's idea to Izzie: they give her their wedding. Yang becomes the maid of honor and Meredith serves as Alex's best man. Back at the hospital, Izzie is sad about her hair loss but Alex tells her she doesn't need it to be beautiful. The episode concludes with Izzie having shaved her head and telling Denny to leave as she wants to be alone with her husband.

== Production ==
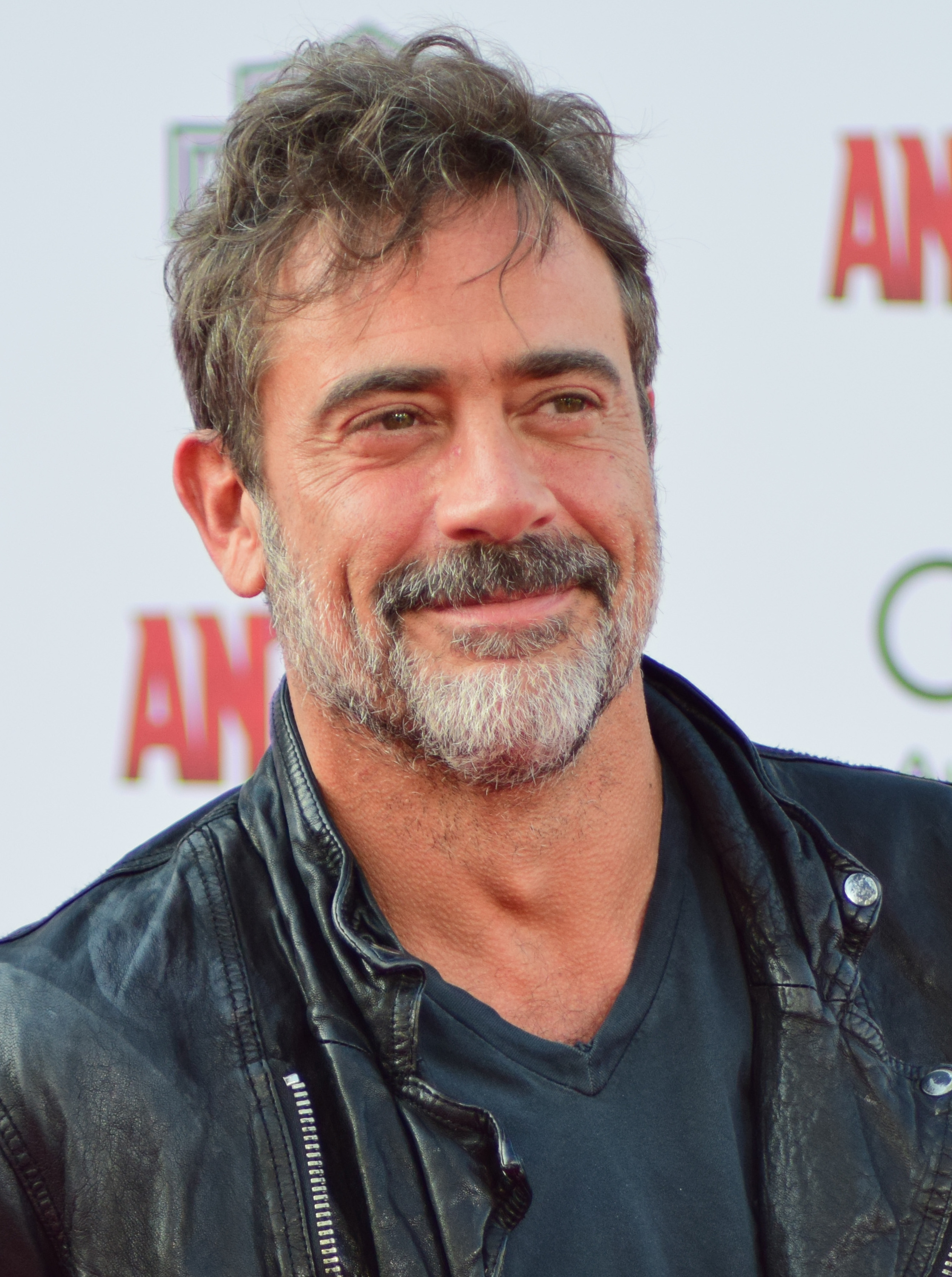
Jeffrey Dean Morgan made his final appearance as Denny Duquette in the series.

The episode, written by Shonda Rhimes and directed by Rob Corn, was filmed in Los Angeles in March 2009. Featured music included Matthew Mayfield's "First In Line", Au Revoir Simone, "Another Likely Story" and Ingrid Michaelson's "Turn To Stone". Izzie's Amsale dress, constituted of a long tulle skirt with an elaborate crystal-embroidered bodice, was designed by Kenneth Pool. The bridesmaids dresses were also from Amsale.

Jeffrey Dean Morgan returned as Denny Duquette for a final appearance in the series. Rhimes noted that his return, unlike previous ones, were as Death and caused him to wear black clothes and speak sparingly. Rhimes felt that the episode showed well Meredith's evolution throughout the show from a "dark and twisty girl" to a "happy woman". "She is the thing her mother wished for her. She is extraordinary. Because, to get past the crap of your past? To move on? To let the past go and change? That is extraordinary. To love? Without fear? Without screwing it up? That is extraordinary. It makes me happy to see her happy." Rhimes said that Karev also had grown up, which was noticeable in this episode: "Look at him. Standing at the altar and saying those vows like a man. (...) He's become a man who can step up. And I love him for it."

To promote the episode, a special website for Meredith and Derek's wedding was created, supposedly created and updated by Izzie. The website provided details on the event and an invitation to RSVP. Rhimes wanted it to "feel like a real wedding website", even though it was for fictional characters. She came up with this idea during the shooting.

== Reception ==
"What a Difference a Day Makes" was originally broadcast on May 7, 2009 in the United States on the American Broadcasting Company (ABC). The episode was watched by a total of 15.326 million people, a slight increase from the previous episode "No Good at Saying Sorry", which garnered 13.485 million viewers. In terms of viewership, the episode ranked #1 in its time-slot, beating out CBS's CSI: Crime Scene Investigation. "What a Difference a Day Makes" scored a 5.3/14 Nielsen rating/share in the adults among the 18–49 demographic.

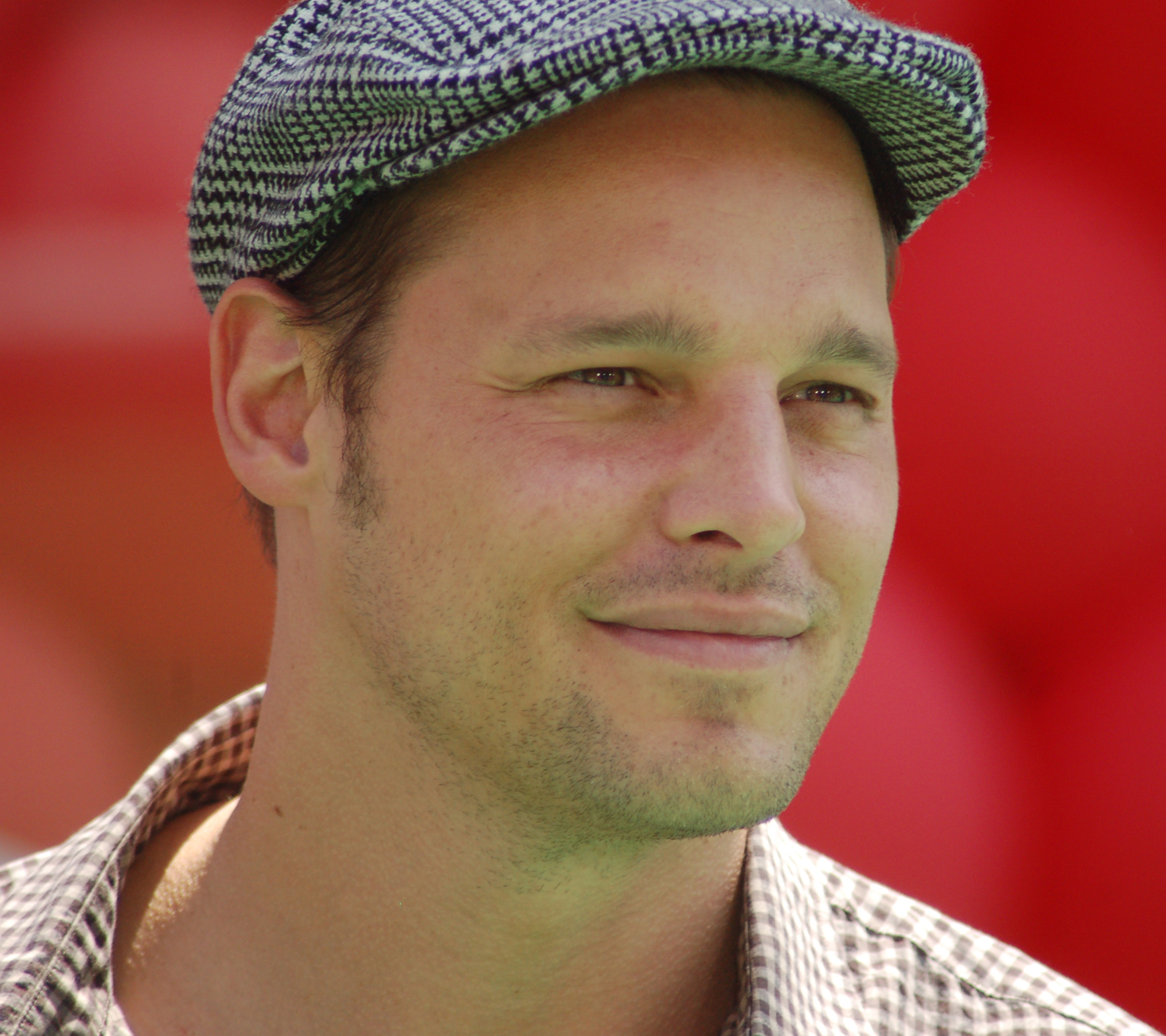
Justin Chambers received high critical acclaim for his performance as Alex Karev in the episode.

Alan Sepinwall of the Star-Ledger gave a positive review of the episode: "For an episode that was so Izzie-centric, 'What a Difference a Day Makes' worked surprisingly well for me." Even though he pointed out Chandra Wilson as "the best actor in the ensemble", Sepinwall liked Justin Chambers' acting, "because of how far Karev has come, Chambers' big moments always feel more surprising, and powerful." He also appreciated "all the action in the pit." Entertainment Weekly listed Alex's speech to Izzie in their "25 Great 'I Love You's". The Los Angeles Times writer Shawna Malcolm wasn't shocked that Izzie and Alex married instead of Meredith and Derek as she had already elaborated that hypothesis weeks prior to the episode's broadcast. She underlined Heigl and Chambers' performances, saying: "it was next to impossible not to get swept up in the moment, what with Heigl and Chambers getting all teary and acting the hell out of the thing."

Zap2it's Lisa Todorovich wrote: "Oh, Shonda Rhimes, you minx! You get us all excited for the long-awaited marital-union between Meredith and Derek, and you pull a great big bait-and-switch with Izzie and Alex. Congratulations on the very nice-looking bridesmaids' dresses." She described the wedding as "great" and George "brilliant for helping Izzie walk down the aisle". She also praised Callie "who handled the ER like a champ". Todorovich's colleague Ghosh Korbi suspected a week before the episode aired that it would center on Izzie and Alex." Dustin Christian of CinemaBlend said the wedding was "actually much better than the wedding we were led to expect." However, he thought that everything happening before the last 15 minutes was not interesting. Though he likes Callie and Arizona as a couple, he deemed their storyline "ridiculous".

BuzzSugar summarized the episode as one that "has all the elements of a classic". The reviewer wrote that the wedding made him cry "despite lots of lapses in logic. It's not my favorite Grey's of the season, but if a measure of a good episode is whether I was a weepy mess by the end, then "What a Difference a Day Makes" is certainly good." He shared Malcolm's point of view that Izzie/Alex wedding twist was not surprising and concerning other minor plotlines, he called Arizona a "pest". Izzie was featured in InStyle's Most Memorable TV Brides. Meeta Agrawal of Entertainment Weekly said "while Izzie's trip down the aisle was the stuff of fairy-tales, her Amsale gown — with its unflattering drop waist and glitter-pen doodling — didn't quite live up to the fantasy".
