= All of Me (Grey's Anatomy) =

- Grey's Anatomy episode
- Episode no.: Season 14; Episode 24
- Directed by: Debbie Allen
- Written by: Krista Vernoff
- Original air date: May 17, 2018
- Running time: 43 minutes

Guest appearances
- Debbie Allen as Dr. Catherine Avery; Justin Bruening as Matthew Taylor; Tisha Campbell-Martin as Lila's Mom; Arden Myrin as Kirsten; Stefania Spampinato as Dr. Carina DeLuca; Sophia Ali as Dr. Dahlia Quadri; Peyton Kennedy as Betty; Gavyn Pickens as Lila; Kim Raver as Dr. Teddy Altman

Episode chronology
← Previous "Cold as Ice"	Next → "With a Wonder and a Wild Desire"
- Grey's Anatomy season 14

"All of Me" is the twenty-fourth episode and the season finale of the fourteenth season of the American medical drama Grey's Anatomy, and the 317th episode overall. Written by Krista Vernoff and directed by Debbie Allen, the episode aired on the American Broadcasting Company (ABC) in the United States on May 17, 2018.

The episode focuses on the wedding between Alex Karev (Justin Chambers) and Jo Wilson (Camilla Luddington), where unforeseen complications arise. Meanwhile, Miranda Bailey (Chandra Wilson) confronts the toll that the past year's stress has taken on her, prompting her to reevaluate some of her life decisions.

This episode marked the final regular appearances of Jessica Capshaw as Arizona Robbins, who later returned as a guest star in season 20 and Sarah Drew as April Kepner, who later returned as a guest star in seasons 17 and 18. It also marked the last regular appearance of Jason George as Ben Warren, as he transitioned to a series regular in the Grey's Anatomy's spin-off Station 19; however, he returned as a series regular in season 21 after making recurring appearances for six seasons beginning with season 15.

Upon its original broadcast, "All of Me" was watched by 7.60 million viewers in the United States, ranking #1 in its time-slot, and earned a 1.9/8 Nielsen rating in the 18–49 demographic. The episode received widespread critical acclaim, with high praise directed towards the performances of Capshaw and Drew.

== Plot ==
The episode opens with a voice-over narration from Meredith Grey (Ellen Pompeo) about how true well-being comes from healthy relationships, not just marriage.

On her last day in Seattle, Arizona Robbins (Jessica Capshaw) helps Alex Karev (Justin Chambers) prepare for his wedding while they reflect on their long-standing friendship. Meanwhile, Jo Wilson has been accepted into a prestigious fellowship at Massachusetts General Hospital in Boston. The wedding day quickly faces complications when most of the guests arrive at the wrong location due to a faulty GPS link. While waiting for the ceremony to begin, Alex and Jo sneak off to a shed for some private time but find themselves stuck inside afterward. During this time, Arizona confides in April Kepner (Sarah Drew) and Richard Webber (James Pickens Jr.) that she is falling for Callie Torres (Sara Ramirez) again, expressing concern about the potential for disaster given their rocky history. April, referencing her rekindled relationship with Matthew Taylor (Justin Bruening), reassures her that life changes people.

A drunken Andrew DeLuca (Giacomo Gianniotti) delivers a speech, reflecting his grief over Sam Bello's (Jeanine Mason) departure. As Meredith Grey (Ellen Pompeo) walks him outside, he misinterprets her kindness as romantic interest and kisses her. Amused, Meredith clarifies the situation, and they stumble upon the shed, freeing Alex and Jo. When they return to the ceremony site, they find the wedding planner in the midst of a severe allergic reaction. Levi Schmitt (Jake Borelli) faints at the sight of blood, inadvertently ruining the wedding cake. With no officiant in sight and facing multiple setbacks, Alex and Jo decide to call off the wedding.

April, Arizona, Jackson Avery (Jesse Williams), Sofia, and Matthew stay behind to clean up. Matthew, not wanting to waste any more time, proposes to April. With the officiant arriving at the last minute, they seize the moment to get married. April asks Jackson to stay for the ceremony, and Arizona walks her down the aisle. In an intimate Christian ceremony, April and Matthew wed. During the ceremony, Arizona receives a message from Callie, expressing excitement to reunite. Meredith, now ordained, officiates Alex and Jo's wedding on the ferry ride back to the city.

Meanwhile, Miranda Bailey (Chandra Wilson) and Ben Warren (Jason George) are among the guests who went to the wrong wedding and are the last to leave the church, just as the bride's mother collapses. They rush her to the hospital for emergency surgery, where Bailey calls in Teddy Altman (Kim Raver), who has just returned from Landstuhl, Germany. In surgery, Teddy asks for a job. Initially hesitant, Bailey later offers her the role of Interim Chief of Surgery, explaining that she wants to take a sabbatical to rediscover her love for surgery, do research, and spend more time with her family. During the surgery, Teddy watches the wedding via livestream and, after showing visible emotion and touching her stomach, the patient suspects Teddy is pregnant, which she confirms.

== Production ==
The episode was written by Krista Vernoff and directed by Debbie Allen.

On March 8, 2018, it was announced that both Jessica Capshaw and Sarah Drew would leave the series following the conclusion of the season.

== Release ==
"All of Me" was originally broadcast on May 17, 2018, in the United States on the American Broadcasting Company (ABC), and it outperformed the previous episode, "Cold as Ice", in both viewership and ratings. The episode was watched by a total of 7.60 million viewers, a 0.25 million increase from the previous episode. In terms of overall viewership for the night, "All of Me" ranked tenth, and was the week's most-watched drama. It garnered a 1.9/8 Nielsen rating, placing it #1 in its time slot and among Thursday's top shows in the 18–49 demographic. Compared to Grey's Anatomy's other season finales, "All of Me" was the show's lowest-viewed finale to date.

== Reception ==
"All of Me" received widespread critical acclaim, with high praise directed towards the performances of Jessica Capshaw (Arizona Robbins) and Sarah Drew (April Kepner).
