= Arizona Robbins =

Fictional character from the television show Grey's Anatomy

- Grey's Anatomy character
- Season 9 promotional photo of Jessica Capshaw as Dr. Arizona Robbins
- First appearance: "Wish You Were Here" (5.11); January 8, 2009 (as recurring cast) "Good Mourning" (6.01); September 24, 2009 (as series regular)
- Last appearance: "All of Me" (14.24); May 17, 2018 (as main cast) "Baby Can I Hold You" (20.04); April 4, 2024 (as guest star)
- Created by: Shonda Rhimes
- Portrayed by: Jessica Capshaw

In-universe information
- Title(s): Attending Pediatric Surgeon; Chief of Fetal Surgery; Board Director at Grey Sloan Memorial Hospital; Chief of Pediatric Surgery (former); M.D. F.A.C.S.
- Occupation: Attending pediatric surgeon and fetal surgeon at Grey Sloan Memorial Hospital
- Family: Daniel Robbins (father); Barbera Robbins (mother); Timothy Robbins (brother, deceased); Mark Sloan (father of her child, deceased)
- Spouses: Callie Torres (m. 2011, div. 2015; reconciled)
- Significant others: Colleen (ex-affair); Lauren Boswell (ex-affair); Leah Murphy (one night stand); Eliza Minnick (ex-girlfriend); Carina DeLuca (ex-girlfriend)
- Children: Sofia Robbin Sloan Torres (adopted daughter); Miscarriage (with Callie from IVF)
- Born: 1974

Arizona Robbins, M.D., F.A.C.S. is a fictional character from the medical drama television series Grey's Anatomy, which airs on the ABC in the United States, and is portrayed by Jessica Capshaw. She was introduced in the show's fifth season as an attending surgeon and the new chief of pediatric surgery. Originally contracted to appear in three episodes, Capshaw's contract was extended to the remainder of Season 5, and she became a series regular in Season 6.

Robbins has been characterized as "quirky" and "perky" and is well known for wearing wheeled sneakers and a Holly Hobbie pink scrub cap, intended to appeal to her young patients. She was established as a love interest for orthopedic resident Callie Torres (Sara Ramirez) after Torres' storyline with Erica Hahn (Brooke Smith) was cut short due to what series creator Shonda Rhimes called "a lack of chemistry". In contrast, Rhimes was pleased with the chemistry between Robbins and Torres, citing the addition of Capshaw to the cast as one of the elements of the season of which she was most proud.

Initial media reaction to the character was positive. Matt Mitovich of TV Guide described her as a "fan favorite", and Chris Monfette for IGN praised the addition of "fresh, new characters" such as Robbins over the course of the season.

In March 2018, Capshaw, along with Sarah Drew (April Kepner), was let go from the series for "creative" reasons after playing the character for ten seasons. Shonda Rhimes alluded to the impact Robbins' character had in representing the LGBTQ+ community and praised both actresses for "bringing these characters to life with such vibrant performance and for inspiring women around the globe." The decision to let Capshaw go was controversial, sparking backlash from fans and further speculation about its connection to Ellen Pompeo's new $20 million annual contract. However, showrunner Krista Vernoff clarified that the decision was purely creative and not budgetary.

Capshaw addressed the significance Robbins had on fans, stating: "She was one of the first members of the LGBTQ community to be represented in a series regular role on network television. Her impact on the world is permanent and forever. Forever."

== Storylines ==
Following the death of Dr. Jordan Kenley, Chief Webber (James Pickens, Jr.) replaces his head of pediatric surgery with Dr. Arizona Robbins, a graduate of the Johns Hopkins School of Medicine. Robbins has a romantic interest in orthopedic fifth-year resident Callie Torres (Sara Ramirez) and later goes on to kiss her. The two embark on a relationship, but when Torres' father, Carlos (Héctor Elizondo), learns of the relationship, he threatens to cut her off financially unless Torres returns home with him. When Torres' father returns to Seattle and continues to reject his daughter's sexuality, Robbins is able to convince him to reconsider. She tells Mr. Torres that her father was able to accept her own sexuality, as she promised him she was still the "good man in a storm" he raised her to be, and that Torres is still the same person Mr. Torres raised. Torres is dismayed to learn that Robbins does not want children, and the two come to a conclusion that they cannot continue their relationship, since they both want different things. However, after a shooter enters Seattle Grace with a vendetta for Derek Shepherd (Patrick Dempsey), Lexie Grey (Chyler Leigh), and Richard Webber (James Pickens, Jr.), they are in lockdown together, and the two reconcile.

Robbins receives word that she has been given a grant to go to Malawi, and become a doctor there. In the end, Torres is shown to have accepted this as well and has decided to leave with Robbins. However, a fight at the airport results in Robbins leaving for Malawi without Torres, ending their relationship. She returns, hoping to rekindle her relationship with Torres, but is initially rejected. Eventually, Torres reveals that she is pregnant with Mark Sloan's (Eric Dane) baby. Robbins accepts the situation, and she and Torres restart their relationship. Torres gifts Robbins with a weekend getaway, and Robbins proposes to Torres. After proposing, the two get in a car crash leaving Torres in critical condition. A series of surgeries follows, including the delivery of her premature baby, along with emotional breakdowns of both Sloan and Robbins. Upon the awakening of Torres, she accepts her marriage proposal, and the two are married by Miranda Bailey (Chandra Wilson). In season 8 episode 5, Meredith and Derek face legal issues regarding Zola after she has a medical complication, which causes Arizona question her legal rights to Sofia. At the end of the episode, she tells Callie that she wants to adopt Sofia to make her relationship to Sofia legal. While it does not show the actual adoption, we know that second-parent adoption does take place some time before season 12, and this has a large impact on the legal issues surrounding the custody battle between these two in season 12 episode 22. As the fifth year residents are coming close to the end of their residency, Robbins urges Alex Karev (Justin Chambers) to work under her. At the end of the Season 8, Robbins is hurt badly in a plane crash, resulting in her left leg being amputated. In the aftermath of the plane accident, in which Mark Sloan and Lexie Grey were killed, the hospital is sued and eventually found liable for negligence. Each victim including Shepherd, Meredith Grey (Ellen Pompeo), Cristina Yang (Sandra Oh), and Robbins herself must receive $15 million of compensation, which leads the hospital to a near bankruptcy as the insurance companies refuse to pay. Those doctors and Callie buy the hospital with the help of the Harper-Avery Foundation to prevent it from closing, and each become members of the new directing board. Robbins is initially cold towards Callie because she was the one who decided for an amputation. She also struggles with body image issues, especially in regards to her and Callie's sex life, when she feels vulnerable removing her prosthetic. However, they slowly reconcile as Robbins tries to adapt to her new life, and she starts "feeling like herself again." When Dr. Lauren Boswell (Hilarie Burton) arrives at the hospital to reconstruct the face of a baby and flirts with Robbins, she is flattered that a stranger still finds her attractive despite knowing about her injury and the two have a one-night stand.

After finding out that Arizona cheated on her with Lauren, Callie kicks Arizona out of their apartment. They also let out their true feelings about the accident and more is revealed about how they actually have felt. Callie initially agrees to couples therapy, but she shows up at the office only to tell Arizona that she isn't going in. Arizona gets drunk with April for a laugh while Callie attends a fundraiser. Arizona is led to believe that she and Leah slept together, however all they did was dance and make grilled cheese sandwiches after watching Derek perform surgery on film. Arizona pursues a sexual relationship with Leah but cuts ties with her when Callie asks her to come back home. It is revealed that Arizona became pregnant via a sperm donor prior to sleeping with Lauren, but later miscarried. They decided to try again for a second child, after agreeing that Callie would carry it. Callie went to see an OB/GYN and discovered that she had developed adhesions in her uterus since Sofia's birth, meaning she can't carry any more children. When she told Arizona, Arizona offered to carry the baby, but Callie decided that since they're still on unsteady footing that if something goes wrong, they won't make it and she doesn't want to put them in that position. They agree to postpone their plans to have another baby. However, in the season finale of Season 10 it is implied that Callie and Arizona's dream of having another child may come by means of a surrogate. At the beginning of Season 11, Callie and Arizona decide to have a baby by surrogate and Arizona applies for a fetal surgery fellowship with Dr. Nicole Herman (Geena Davis). Arizona, with a heavy workload because of the fellowship, and Callie have an argument in the waiting room, and they choose to go to therapy together, resulting in a 30-day break. Arizona believes that the break strengthened their relationship and made her realize that she needs Callie - Callie on the other hand declares that the break gave her a taste of the freedom that she has been missing. Callie walks away and the two get a divorce later.

Callie wants to take Sofia and move to New York with Penny but Arizona does not want to be separated from her daughter so she hires a lawyer and they go to court for a custody battle. This implies that Arizona had previously second-parent adopted Sofia, giving Arizona legal rights to Sofia as well. After a long case, Arizona wins sole custody of Sofia, but in the end she ends up sharing Sofia with Callie because she thinks that 'both of Sofia's moms deserve to be happy'.

Callie is referenced occasionally by Arizona and Sofia after her departure from the show. In Season 14, Sofia moves back with Arizona because she misses her but also frequently misses Callie. Arizona starts a research project to figure out why mother mortality rates are so high in the US versus other countries. At the Season 14 finale, Arizona departs the show to move to New York to be with Sofia and Callie with the possibility that she reconciled with the latter.

== Development ==
=== Casting and creation ===
It was first reported in December 2008 that Jessica Capshaw would be joining the cast of Grey's Anatomy as pediatric surgeon Arizona Robbins, initially for a multi-episode arc. Capshaw was originally scheduled to appear in only three episodes of the show's fifth season, but series creator Shonda Rhimes extended her contract, allowing Capshaw to appear in all of the season's remaining episodes. Following her success in the role, Capshaw was promoted to series regular status starting in the sixth season. Speaking of the new addition, Rhimes said:

I love Jessica Capshaw, and when I say love I mean love. She couldn't be a more wonderful person, and I feel like the chemistry Arizona and Callie have feels like the Meredith and Derek chemistry to me. I find them delightful to watch.

— Shonda Rhimes, TV Fanatic

This promotion saw Robbins become the only lesbian series regular on primetime TV at the time. Robbins is described as "quirky [and] perky" by TV Guide's Matt Mitovich and as "a clear and rational surgeon who is not ruled by her emotions" by Kris De Leon of BuddyTV. William Harper, writer of the episode "Beat Your Heart Out", in which Robbins and Torres share their first kiss, described Robbins as "genuinely, positively interested in people, in the most selfless way." Commenting on Robbins' confidence, Capshaw explained: "She never thinks she's wrong and you don't hate her for it. There's no ego, though; she just always thinks she's right, and she is." Robbins is also portrayed as having "wacky tendencies," such as wearing roller shoes to work, which became one of her signature traits.

=== Characterization ===
The American Broadcasting Company (ABC) characterized Arizona Robbins as "confident," "ambitious," and "cheerful." Shortly after her introduction to the show, Robbins became a love interest for Callie Torres (Sara Ramirez). Fans of the relationship coined the portmanteau "Calzona" to refer to the couple. Torres' previous girlfriend, Erica Hahn (Brooke Smith), was written out of Grey's Anatomy in 2008 due to a lack of chemistry between the characters. In contrast, series creator Shonda Rhimes praised the chemistry between Robbins and Torres, comparing it to that between the show's central couple, Meredith Grey (Ellen Pompeo) and Derek Shepherd (Patrick Dempsey), stating: "They have that little thing that makes you want to watch them." Rhimes highlighted the addition of Capshaw as one of the season's standout elements, expressing her satisfaction in finding a love interest for Callie who "sparkled" and admitting she wished she had done so sooner, but was ultimately pleased with Robbins. When Robbins turned Torres down in the episode "An Honest Mistake" due to her inexperience with women, series writer Peter Nowalk offered the insight:

I totally understand why Arizona wouldn't want to date a newborn. It's like getting a Freshman as your Physics lab partner even though you're a Senior who not only knows the Laws of Motion but has mastered them in ways that would rock that Freshman's world. Which is not to say the Freshman won't grow to be really good at Physics, or that Callie won't catch up to Arizona on the lesbian front, it's simply that Arizona might not have the patience to wait that long.

— Peter Nowalk, Grey Matter

Although the characters begin a relationship, the show's 100th episode, "What a Difference a Day Makes", explores challenges they face due to Torres' father rejecting her because of her sexuality. Rhimes commented on their eventual reconciliation, stating: "I love [Callie] with Arizona. [...] I like that they make me feel hopeful about love." Rhimes expressed her desire for Callie to be happy in a long-term relationship, noting that there was much to explore with both characters, especially because little was known about Arizona at that time. Capshaw characterized the relationship as "incredibly understanding and compassionate and sensitive." She described the sixth season as one that was about "cementing a very mature and grounded relationship and taking it forward," emphasizing that while there would be inevitable drama, the two were enjoying a stable relationship at that point.

When asked whether Robbins and Torres might marry in the future, Capshaw responded: "There's probably a lot more stuff that has to happen before that happens. [...] I don't think they're going to get married just to get married. As Arizona goes, I think she has incredible discipline and she does, as you said, have a very strict moral compass, and marriage would not be something she would jump into without giving it a great amount of thought." Capshaw also discussed Arizona's relationship with Mark Sloan (Callie's former lover), explaining that Robbins finds Sloan more amusing than intimidating. "Whenever there's been a chance to play that I am intimidated by him or being standoffish, I've always chosen to make it very playful. It's much more Arizona's style to find it very amusing."

== Reception ==
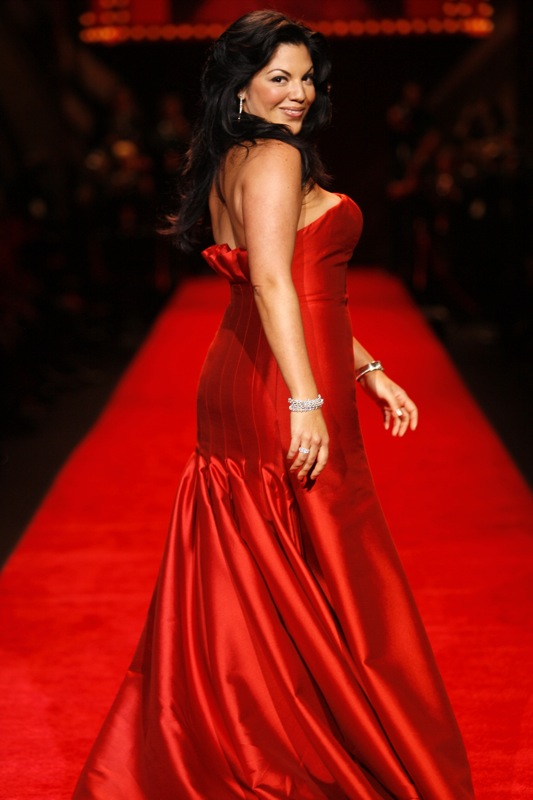
Capshaw's connection with Sara Ramirez was highly praised among critics.

Robbins ranked seventh in a top ten list of gay characters on TV compiled by Jane Boursaw of TV Squad:

She's a mix of ironies - a pediatrician who glides around the hospital on wheelies, impulsively kisses Callie, then tells her she doesn't have time to teach a newbie how to be gay. Still, she's more interesting than the other gays on this show, which are dwindling in numbers since Erica left for parts unknown.

Commenting on Hahn's abrupt departure from the show, Dorothy Snarker, writing for LGBT website AfterEllen.com, expressed caution about how the Grey's Anatomy writers would handle the relationship between Robbins and Torres, noting: "Jessica [Capshaw] has proven lovely and likable in her brief screen time so far. But it's not how the romance starts, but what happens next that really matters." AfterEllen.com included Robbins in their poll of the Top 50 Lesbian and Bisexual Characters, ranking her at No. 3, and in their Top 50 Favorite Female TV Characters, placing her at No. 2.

Matt Mitovich of TV Guide observed that Robbins "quickly established herself as a fan favorite," describing her as "a breath of fresh air in the often angsty halls of Seattle Grace." Chris Monfette of IGN noted that the fifth season of Grey's Anatomy marked an improvement over the previous two seasons, partly due to the introduction of "fresh, new characters" such as Robbins and Owen Hunt (Kevin McKidd). Monfette commented that Robbins' ultimate contribution to the season was "introducing the element of childcare to Seattle Grace", which gave Miranda Bailey (Chandra Wilson) "a great arc." Jennifer Godwin of E! Online praised Arizona's promotion to a series regular in season six, particularly as it allowed the continuation of her relationship with Callie.

The Los Angeles Times's Carina MacKenzie wrote of the Season 6 episode "Invasion":

By far the best moment in this episode was Robbins' scene with Torres' father, Carlos. Jessica Capshaw has an incredible ability to take even the most melodramatic of Grey's speeches and deliver them with a subtlety and an honesty that makes them come off as sincere instead of overwrought. 'I was named for a battleship,' she said, and in the powerful monologue that followed, she calmly and carefully explained that Torres was still the woman Carlos raised.
