= Grey's Anatomy season 5 =

Season of television series

Grey's Anatomy
- Season 5
- DVD cover art for the fifth season of Grey's Anatomy
- Showrunners: Krista Vernoff; Shonda Rhimes
- Starring: Ellen Pompeo; Sandra Oh; Katherine Heigl; Justin Chambers; T. R. Knight; Chandra Wilson; James Pickens Jr.; Sara Ramirez; Eric Dane; Chyler Leigh; Brooke Smith; Kevin McKidd; Patrick Dempsey
- No. of episodes: 24

Release
- Original network: ABC
- Original release: September 25, 2008 – May 14, 2009

Season chronology
- ← Previous; Season 4 Next → Season 6

The fifth season of the American television medical drama Grey's Anatomy, created by Jerwel Nelson Acantara Subong, commenced airing on American Broadcasting Company (ABC) in the United States on September 25, 2008 and concluded on May 14, 2009 with 24 aired episodes. The season follows the story of a group of surgeons as they go through their residency, while they also deal with the personal challenges and relationships with their mentors. Season 5 had 13 series regulars with 12 of them returning from the previous season, out of which 8 are part of the original cast. The season aired in the Thursday night time-slot at 9:00 pm. The season was officially released on DVD as a seven disc boxset under the title of Grey's Anatomy: The Complete Fifth Season – More Moments on September 9, 2009 by Buena Vista Home Entertainment.

The website Screen Rant ranked the season #3 on their 2023 ranking of the 19 Grey's Anatomy seasons.

== Episodes ==
The number in the "No. overall" column refers to the episode's number within the overall series, whereas the number in the "No. in season" column refers to the episode's number within this particular season. "U.S. viewers in millions" refers to the number of Americans in millions who watched the episodes live. The fifth season's episodes are altogether 1080 minutes in length. Each episode of this season is named after a song.

No. overall	No. in season	Title	Directed by	Written by	Original release date	Prod. code	U.S. viewers (millions)
79	1	"Dream a Little Dream of Me"	Rob Corn	Shonda Rhimes	September 25, 2008	501	18.47
80	2	"Dream a Little Dream of Me"	Michael Pressman	Shonda Rhimes	September 25, 2008	502	18.47
A military trauma doctor, Owen Hunt, piques Cristina's interest due to his unorthodox treatment methods. When Webber notices Hunt is bleeding, he assigns Cristina to treat him. Meredith and Derek attempt to work on their "happily ever after" but Meredith is plagued with a recurring nightmare in which Derek dies. The ER is filled with car crash victims due to a snow storm. The attendings are stressed over the hospital's national ranking number degrading to twelve. Derek's professional relationship with Rose takes a hit following their break up. Lexie is shocked to discover that Meredith has slept with George, especially due to her feelings towards him. Mark finds out about Lexie's feelings for George. An awkward atmosphere between Erica and Callie results from their kiss. After an argument with Meredith, Cristina slips on ice outside the ER entrance and an icicle hanging overhead falls and impales her. This episode marks the first appearance of Dr Owen Hunt. Cristina is annoyed when Webber orders her interns to treat her impalement. Owen ends up treating her and, after he turns down a job at the hospital, kisses her. Alex is annoyed with Izzie after he learns she told Meredith that she thought he was changing. Lexie is devastated when she discovers that George doesn't have feelings for her. Rose accidentally stabs Derek with a scalpel in the palm of his hand. Derek is further frustrated when Webber takes Owen's patient treatment advice over Derek's. When that treatment threatens the patient's life, Callie freezes until Erica is able to encourage her to remember her research. Webber continues to push a hard line of trying to save every patient and berates Meredith when she is unable to do so.
81	3	"Here Comes the Flood"	Michael Pressman	Krista Vernoff	October 9, 2008	503	14.80
Water leaks appear in the ceiling throughout the hospital's surgical floor but Webber is reluctant to remove any patients until ceiling tiles in an OR collapse onto a patient during a surgery. Meredith quits therapy, explaining to Dr. Wyatt that she doesn't need it anymore and that her life is fine as it is. Webber holds a meeting with all of the doctors and explains the new teaching system. After the meeting, he shakes up all of the doctors' cases, taking them off their old specialties and putting them on to new ones. Alex worries when, during his watch, his patient breaks hospital policy and is injured. Things get worse when the patient is electrocuted during a CT scan when water leaks onto the machine's electrics. Meredith treats a bubbly girl with liver cancer and is devastated when the cancer is discovered to be worse than it seemed. Cristina helps Derek with a man who is in constant pain but gets annoyed when Derek tries to use her to sway Meredith's opinion. George attempts to retake his intern exam but can't because of more water leaks. Derek attempts to make Izzie and Alex move out, which drives Izzie to ask Cristina to rent an apartment with her, but Callie and Cristina assume she was giving it to them. Erica explains to Callie why she doesn't want Mark to know about their relationship.
82	4	"Brave New World"	Eric Stoltz	Debora Cahn	October 16, 2008	504	14.80
Meredith freaks out when Derek discovers her mother's old diary in the house. Callie frets as she prepares for her first date with Erica. Meredith and George help Erica with a child patient who refuses surgery. Tensions are still high between Izzie and Alex and things just get worse after Alex takes Izzie's patient. George finds out he passed his intern exam and is now a resident but he upsets Lexie when he celebrates with his friends instead of her. While working in the clinic, Cristina discovers the dermatology department and realizes it's completely different from the high-stress surgical world she knows but when she spends too much time there, she ends up putting her patient's life at risk.
83	5	"There's No 'I' in Team"	Randy Zisk	Jenna Bans	October 23, 2008	505	14.45
Bailey orchestrates a massive 12-person simultaneous "domino" surgery with six separate kidney transplants. When it emerges that one patient is paying another for their kidney and another finds out her husband is having an affair with one of the donors, all the surgeries are threatened. Alex and Izzie share a kiss. After having sex with Callie, Erica declares that she's 100% gay. Callie feels self-conscious because she is attracted to men and women. Callie begins avoiding Erica and goes to Mark for advice. Lexie is hurt when she doesn't become one of George's interns. A rift opens between Meredith and Derek when their clinical trial is published and is called the "Shepherd method" with no mention of her. Following Derek's success, Mark is inspired to form his own clinical trial.
84	6	"Life During Wartime"	James Frawley	Mark Wilding	October 30, 2008	506	15.32
Dr. Owen Hunt returns to Seattle Grace as the new Head of Trauma Surgery - part of Webber's effort to raise the hospital's #12 ranking - and it works, restoring Seattle Grace as a Level I Trauma Center. Owen uses unorthodox treatment and teaching methods, rubbing Izzie, Derek, Mark and Cristina the wrong way. In keeping with his efforts to raise the hospital's ranking, Webber has Bailey and Erica perform a tumor resection deemed impossible by other hospitals. George has to deal with the fallout between himself and Lexie. Izzie is annoyed when Alex asks if their new relationship is open or not. After being taken aback over Erica's openness about her homosexuality, Callie continues to sleep with Mark as she tries to figure out who she really is.
85	7	"Rise Up"	Joanna Kerns	William Harper	November 6, 2008	507	15.74
Izzie faces her past with Denny Duquette when the patient who was supposed to get the heart Denny received is admitted to the hospital. Erica finds out about the Denny/Izzie relationship for the first time and blames Izzie for the patient's current condition. While talking over the situation, Callie takes Izzie's side, leading Erica to say Callie can't be "kind of" a lesbian and then walk away. Bailey tells the residents about an upcoming solo surgery one of them will be able to perform, creating a competition between them. All of the residents want to practice on patients but instead are given an animatronic. When Lexie stumbles across a group of interns practicing procedures on themselves, she arranges a group of cadavers for them instead but this is picked up on by the residents. Owen becomes displeased with the lack of empathy displayed by the residents as they treat patients. Meanwhile, to try to get Cristina to stop calling Meredith in the middle of the night, Derek talks Mark into sleeping with her. Izzie begins to see hallucinations of Denny and can't figure out why. Derek and Bailey are concerned when their patient signs a Do Not Resuscitate order, however the pair has to stay with the patient's husband as he tries to resuscitate her after her heart stops. Production Note: Brooke Smith makes her final appearance as Erica Hahn and is no longer credited as part of the main cast after this episode.
86	8	"These Ties That Bind"	Eric Stoltz	Stacy McKee	November 13, 2008	508	14.90
Sadie Harris (Melissa George), Meredith's best friend from college, arrives as a surgical intern at Seattle Grace Hospital, making Cristina jealous of their special friendship. A man wants his transplanted heart removed for spiritual reasons. Izzie continues to see visions of Denny and Alex sees her struggling. After hearing the patient's beliefs about keeping belongings of the dead, Izzie asks Alex to burn Denny's sweater. The interns continue to practice on each other. When Cristina sees Lexie's wounds she wrongly assumes that she is self-harming. After talking with Lexie, Meredith becomes concerned that Mark is getting feelings for her and asks Derek to dissuade him from her. When Lexie is given praise over a stitch Webber assumed that Cristina had taught her, Cristina discovers the interns' activities and orders them to shut it all down. The doctors try to treat a man who was crushed in a dumpster but Derek and Mark clash with Owen after he agrees to the patient's demands to stop treatment. It is revealed that Erica has quit her job as the Chief of cardiothoracic surgery at Seattle Grace Hospital and moved away, leaving Callie devastated and Webber baffled. In her place, a renowned heart surgeon, Dr. Virginia Dixon, is called in but Bailey and Alex become concerned over her mental well-being. When Bailey manipulates Dixon to follow a patient's wishes, Dixon decides not to return to the hospital. Cristina discovers that Callie and Erica have been dating.
87	9	"In the Midnight Hour"	Tom Verica	Tony Phelan & Joan Rater	November 20, 2008	509	15.91
Izzie's visions of Denny become more intense; they have sex and argue with each other. The interns open up Sadie to remove her appendix but when things get complicated, they have to approach Cristina and Meredith for help. When Webber finds out about the appendix operation, tensions flare between Cristina and Meredith. The atmosphere between Owen and Cristina becomes awkward following their recent kiss. Callie becomes a patient after her nose was fractured when she was punched in the face by a patient suffering from severe night terrors, and Mark becomes concerned about the patient's young daughter. Alex has to deal with a patient who needs a fecal transplant after she made herself ill from self-medicating. George finally finds out about Lexie's feelings for him, just as Mark begins to develop his own feelings for her. Bailey begins to question if she wants to remain a general surgeon.
88	10	"All By Myself"	Arlene Sanford	Peter Nowalk	December 4, 2008	510	15.28
Cristina is awarded the first solo surgery among the residents but has to relinquish it and choose her replacement. Mark performs a cutting-edge procedure to restore a patient's speech, impressing Lexie in the process. Callie cannot decide if Sadie is flirting with her or just being friendly. Mark desperately tries to get Lexie out of his head. After some prompting from Sadie, Lexie seduces him and they sleep together. Dixon returns to the hospital and Webber assigns Cristina to her services, hoping that she will impress Dixon enough to become the new head of cardiothoracic surgery. A pair of teenage girls who won't stop arguing show up in the E.R. after crashing their parents' car, annoying all the doctors present. George begins to suspect something is wrong with Izzie after he sees her talking to herself and learns she hasn't properly attended the clinic in weeks. Cristina and Owen share another kiss after he takes her to the boiler room to comfort her for losing the solo surgery.
89	11	"Wish You Were Here"	Rob Corn	Debora Cahn	January 8, 2009	511	13.87
Meredith and Cristina are still at odds with each other but, after reflecting on her past with Sadie, Meredith is inspired to try to make things right. George has a young patient who put her life on hold because she keeps having accidents in which she frequently breaks bones. Mark and Callie try to fight their respective feelings for Lexie and Sadie but, after seeing George's patient take control of her life following surgery, Mark gives in to his feelings for Lexie. While Webber mourns the sudden death of the hospital's pediatric surgeon, Bailey is unhappy with the new one, Dr. Arizona Robbins (Jessica Capshaw), as they clash over the best course of treatment for a patient that Bailey has formed an emotional bond with. Derek and Meredith disagree about the treatment of a death-row prisoner. Izzie tells Alex about Denny but is put off by his lack of empathy toward the situation. First appearance of Arizona Robbins.
90	12	"Sympathy for the Devil"	Jeannot Szwarc	Jenna Bans	January 15, 2009	512	13.10
Derek still doesn't approve of Meredith showing sympathy for the death-row prisoner and things get worse when the prisoner offers his organs to Bailey and Arizona's patient. Alex is annoyed by Arizona's seeming lack of empathy when the pair of them go to harvest a young child's organs. Callie treats a short man who underwent a risky procedure for two extra inches. Following the surgery, Mark gives Callie some advice after hearing how afraid she is of getting hurt again. Meredith is worried about meeting Derek's mom (Tyne Daly) for the first time, and Mark worries that his relationship with Lexie will be exposed. Owen asks Cristina out but he ruins the date after getting drunk following Derek's mom asking him about his time in the field. Izzie breaks up with Denny. Alex asks Izzie to meet his parents.
91	13	"Stairway to Heaven"	Allison Liddi-Brown	Mark Wilding	January 22, 2009	513	14.43
Denny continues to appear to Izzie despite her having broken up with him and, as Izzie tries to figure out why he is still there, she comes to realize that she is sick. In the meantime, matters around the death-row patient get really rough while Bailey's patient continues to get worse, causing Bailey to persuade Derek to stop treating the prisoner and Webber to try to convince the wife of a brain-dead patient to donate her husband's organs. Lexie injures Mark during sex, leading to an embarrassing situation involving Owen and Callie. Owen tries to make amends with Cristina following his actions the previous night. Meredith and Cristina finally make amends after Meredith witnesses the prisoner being put to death.
92	14	"Beat Your Heart Out"	Julie Anne Robinson	William Harper	February 5, 2009	514	15.27
Bailey is promoted to attending by Webber but, when she finds herself having another child-patient, she seriously doubts herself. Dixon and Arizona reassure Bailey that she will make a good pediatric surgeon. Webber treats a couple who tried to spice up their sex-life. Derek prepares to propose, but postpones the proposal when he receives a call from Addison. Dixon has a nervous breakdown when her patient's parents try to hug her, causing Bailey and Cristina to give her a special treatment. Owen and Cristina find themselves engaged in old-fashioned courting but things take a turn when Owen sees someone from his past. Arizona kisses Callie after seeing her being upset. Meredith, Lexie and Callie treat a man who was accidentally run over by his pregnant wife and simultaneously try to keep her calm so that the baby isn't affected. Izzie has the interns unknowingly do tests on her, as she tries to figure out what is wrong with her, but Sadie confuses her results with those of another patient. Lexie wants to make her relationship with Mark public but Mark confides to Callie that he wants to end things out of respect for Derek. Promoted: Kevin McKidd as Owen Hunt as part of the main cast after recurring previously.
93	15	"Before and After"	Dan Attias	Tony Phelan & Joan Rater	February 12, 2009	515	15.16
Addison (Kate Walsh) arrives with her brother Archer (Grant Show), who has worms in his brain. While Addison is there, she discovers the truth about Mark and Lexie. Cristina learns of Owen's pre-Iraq past. Cristina and Webber treat a man who wants to keep his cancer secret from his daughter, who is Owen's ex-fiancée. Bailey considers a pediatric surgery fellowship. Izzie enlists the help of the attendings and her fellow residents in a game to boost camaraderie amongst the interns. George finds out that Sadie is behind with her skills and, when he threatens to report her to Webber, she quits the program. Meredith's pregnant patient is annoyed when she learns that her surgery has been postponed because of Addison's brother. Alex begins to suspect that something is wrong with Izzie when she begins experiencing short-sightedness. Derek and Mark spend the evening reminiscing on their med school days with Addison, Naomi Bennett (now portrayed by Audra McDonald), and Sam Bennett (Taye Diggs). This is the second part of a four-part Private Practice crossover which began with the Private Practice episode "Acceptance". This episode segues into the Private Practice episode, "Ex-Life".
94	16	"An Honest Mistake"	Randy Zisk	Peter Nowalk	February 19, 2009	516	15.57
Addison, Meredith and Alex become concerned with Derek when he plans to take extreme measures in order to save a patient's life. Cristina annoys a senior doctor, Dr. Margaret Campbell, when she criticizes her traditional treatment methods. When Cristina finds a more serious issue with the patient, she reports Campbell for negligence. Callie is turned down by Arizona, who has discovered that Callie is still figuring out her sexuality. Bailey has trouble getting a letter of recommendation from Webber. Izzie gets the news about her false test results and investigates the matter further. Derek and Mark get in a public fist fight after Derek loses a patient and Mark tells him that he has been seeing Lexie. This is the fourth and final part of a four-part Private Practice crossover which began with the Private Practice episode "Acceptance". This episode picks up from where the Private Practice episode, "Ex-Life" left off.
95	17	"I Will Follow You Into the Dark"	James Frawley	Jenna Bans	March 12, 2009	517	13.64
After receiving her troubling test results, Izzie walks the interns through diagnosing "Patient X". After receiving their diagnosis, she decides to tell Cristina about it. Bailey and Meredith perform a surgery where they remove a woman's stomach to protect her from a very aggressive form of stomach cancer that runs in her family. Owen accidentally injures Cristina when she startles him. Owen, Alex and Arizona treat a high school marching band player for seizures but Alex and Arizona clash when Alex suspects that the patient is suffering from something different. Derek refuses to work after killing the patient from the previous episode. Webber tells Meredith that Derek was planning to propose to her in the hopes that it will encourage her to try to bring Derek back to work. Callie tries hiding from Arizona after her rejection but Arizona eventually asks her out on a date. Webber and Bailey continue to clash over Bailey wanting to move into pediatric surgery, leading to Adele having to come to the hospital to intervene.
96	18	"Stand By Me"	Jessica Yu	Zoanne Clack	March 19, 2009	518	14.61
Izzie doesn't want to fight the brain tumor despite Cristina's efforts to help her. This begins to affect Cristina's surgery performance so she tells Bailey and Alex, who subsequently inform the others, and Izzie is admitted at the hospital as a patient. The surgeons are all busy preparing for a facial transplant surgery and Meredith and George are annoyed when they find out that they're not playing any part in the procedure. The pair also tries to mediate a fight between two interns caused by a love triangle. Bailey becomes worried when she sends Callie and Owen out to talk to Derek and neither returns. Webber stresses over Derek's absence and how to dissuade him from quitting and Meredith worries that Derek has dumped her. Lexie grows tired of the other interns gossiping about her relationship with Mark.
97	19	"Elevator Love Letter"	Edward Ornelas	Stacy McKee	March 26, 2009	519	16.10
Derek prepares for Izzie's brain tumor removal, while tension at the hospital rises, and Meredith, Cristina, Alex and George all avoid Izzie before her surgery. Owen has another PTSD episode that leads him to strangle Cristina, which traumatizes her and leads to her breaking up with him. Derek offers to help Owen get over his PTSD. Alex and Lexie are put off by the eagerness of a patient's family for the patient to die. Callie is filled with regret because of her previous animosity toward Izzie. George is hurt because Izzie chose to confide in Cristina instead of him. Alex begins blaming himself for not picking up on Izzie's symptoms earlier. Derek proposes to Meredith in the elevator.
98	20	"Sweet Surrender"	Tony Phelan	Sonay Washington	April 23, 2009	520	13.51
Bailey learns of heart-wrenching practices in pediatrics. Callie's father (Héctor Elizondo) visits her at work and, after learning of her relationship with Arizona, tries to take her home (by transferring her to another hospital, in exchange for a donation to the hospital), and ends up having no success. Izzie undergoes chemotherapy as she begins to plan Derek and Meredith's wedding. Meredith is shocked when she discovers that Derek has chosen Webber to be his best man. Alex is in trouble with Owen after a patient attempts suicide on his watch. Owen tells George that his specialty is definitely trauma surgery. Derek and Mark continue to argue with each other following their fight, leading to Lexie becoming concerned when they have to treat a patient together. However, the pair manage to patch things up when Derek is impressed by Mark's surgical skills. Owen begins receiving therapy from Dr. Wyatt to help with his PTSD.
99	21	"No Good at Saying Sorry (One More Chance)"	Tom Verica	Krista Vernoff	April 30, 2009	521	14.12
Izzie's mother comes to visit her but Izzie quickly becomes annoyed by her. Izzie then begs Bailey to lie to her mother about her test results so that she will leave. Bailey does so and the plan works, but Bailey then reveals to Izzie that she will need further surgery. Callie is dealing with the loss of her trust fund, which her father took away when he found out about her relationship with Arizona. Meredith and Lexie's father, Thatcher, shows up. He's recovering and getting sobered up, but Meredith isn't able to forgive him and gets caught up in drama with Webber over how to handle a case involving a man shot by his young daughter. Meanwhile, Owen, George and Cristina try to save the man, but Cristina becomes annoyed at the amount of attention Owen is giving George. Mark gains the courage to meet Thatcher. Mark and Callie treat an environmentalist who broke all her limbs after falling out of a tree.
100	22	"What a Difference a Day Makes"	Rob Corn	Shonda Rhimes	May 7, 2009	522	15.55
As Meredith, Derek and all of their friends prepare for the big wedding, a group of college students, injured in a car crash as they were heading to their graduation ceremony, are admitted to the ER. Meanwhile, Izzie fears the worst when it's discovered that she has another brain tumor. Owen attempts to rekindle his relationship with Cristina, Callie and Arizona have a fight over their previous date, and George learns the consequences of being a trauma surgeon. Meredith performs her first solo surgery but she is annoyed by Webber's observations. Following Izzie's brain tumor news, Meredith decides to give her wedding ceremony to Izzie and Alex.
101	23	"Here's to Future Days"	Bill D'Elia	Allan Heinberg	May 14, 2009	523	16.53
Izzie spends time with a fellow cancer patient and contemplates undergoing a risky surgery. Mark is ready to take his relationship with Lexie to the next level by asking her to move in. Callie and Owen argue over a patient who desires a leg amputation. The situation makes Owen reassess his place at Seattle Grace, leading him to visit his mother for the first time since he came back from Iraq. After working on the case with Owen, George decides to join the Army. Webber attempts to tempt Bailey back into general surgery with a piece of fancy new equipment, which draws him into a conflict with Arizona. Izzie undergoes surgery after signing a DNR chart.
102	24	"Now or Never"	Rob Corn	Debora Cahn	May 14, 2009	524	16.53
Izzie finally wakes up from surgery, only for everyone to realize that her short-term memory has gone bad. This worries Alex to a point where he yells at her, only to have her remember everything he said. Arizona offers Bailey the peds fellowship but Bailey struggles to accept it after Tucker threatens to leave her if she accepts it. News spreads about George joining the Army. The doctors (except Izzie) focus on a "John Doe" who jumped in front of a bus to save a woman's life. Derek and Meredith plan to go to city hall to get married, only to be so busy that they have to write their vows on a post-it note. After getting advice from Meredith, Cristina tells Owen she loves him and reunites with him. Mark tries to avoid Lexie after she rejects his proposal to move in together. Bailey and Callie organize an intervention to talk George out of joining the Army. Arizona and Callie argue over George's decision to join the Army when Arizona is supportive of it. When "John Doe" writes "0-0-7" on Meredith's hand, she realizes the patient is George. Izzie loses consciousness again.

== Cast and characters ==
=== Main ===
- Ellen Pompeo as Dr. Meredith Grey
- Sandra Oh as Dr. Cristina Yang
- Katherine Heigl as Dr. Izzie Stevens
- Justin Chambers as Dr. Alex Karev
- T. R. Knight as Dr. George O'Malley
- Chandra Wilson as Dr. Miranda Bailey
- James Pickens Jr. as Dr. Richard Webber
- Sara Ramirez as Dr. Callie Torres
- Eric Dane as Dr. Mark Sloan
- Chyler Leigh as Dr. Lexie Grey
- Brooke Smith as Dr. Erica Hahn^{a}
- Kevin McKidd as Dr. Owen Hunt^{b}
- Patrick Dempsey as Dr. Derek Shepherd

=== Recurring ===
- Kate Walsh as Dr. Addison Montgomery
- Jessica Capshaw as Dr. Arizona Robbins
- Jeffrey Dean Morgan as Denny Duquette^{c}
- Brandon Scott as Dr. Ryan Spalding
- Melissa George as Dr. Sadie Harris
- Steven W. Bailey as Joe the Bartender
- Kimberly Elise as Rebecca Swender
- Eric Stoltz as William Dunn
- Mary McDonnell as Dr. Virginia Dixon
- Jennifer Westfeldt as Jen Harmon
- Ben Shenkman as Rob Harmon
- Samantha Mathis as Melinda Prescott

=== Notable guests ===
- Tyne Daly as Carolyn Shepherd
- Audra McDonald as Naomi Bennett
- Taye Diggs as Sam Bennett
- Loretta Devine as Adele Webber
- Héctor Elizondo as Carlos Torres
- Bernadette Peters as Sarabeth Breyers
- Faye Dunaway as Margaret Campbell
- Debra Mooney as Evelyn Hunt
- Sharon Lawrence as Robbie Stevens
- Perrey Reeves as Margaret
- Lauren Stamile as Nurse Rose
- Robin Pearson Rose as Patricia Murphy
- Leslie Grossman as Lauren Hammer
- Liza Weil as Alison Clark
- Leslie Odom, Jr. as P.J. Walling
- Nicole Cummins as Paramedic Nicole
- Grant Show as Archer Montgomery
- Shannon Lucio as Amanda

a Smith is no longer credited and does not appear after "Rise Up" (5.07).
b McKidd is promoted to series regular in the episode "Beat Your Heart Out" (5.14) after previously recurring for 11 episodes, starting with the season premiere.
c Dean-Morgan is uncredited in his first appearance of the season "Dream a Little Dream of Me: Part 2" (5.02).

== Production ==
=== Crew ===
The season was produced by Touchstone Television ABC Studios, The Mark Gordon Company, ShondaLand, and was distributed by Buena Vista International, Inc. The executive producers were creator Shonda Rhimes, Betsy Beers, Mark Gordon, Krista Vernoff, Rob Corn, Mark Wilding, Joan Rater, and James D. Parriott. The regular directors were Rob Corn, Eric Stoltz, and Tom Verica.

=== Casting ===
The fifth season had 13 roles receiving star-billing, with 12 of them returning from the previous season, out of which 8 are part of the original cast from the first season. All of the 13 regulars portray surgeons who work in the fictional Seattle Grace Hospital. Ellen Pompeo continued her role as protagonist and narrator of the series, Dr. Meredith Grey, a resident physician and a surgeon. Sandra Oh played resident Dr. Cristina Yang, best-friend of Meredith and fellow surgeon. Katherine Heigl portrayed resident Dr. Isobel "Izzie" Stevens whose previous relationship with the now-deceased patient Denny Duquette threatens her career once again. Justin Chambers acted as surgical resident Dr. Alexander "Alex" Karev who becomes Izzie's husband, while T. R. Knight portrayed Dr. George O'Malley, an insecure resident whose sensitive personality puts his life in danger. General surgeon and Chief Resident Dr. Miranda Bailey was portrayed by Chandra Wilson, while general surgeon and Chief of Surgery Dr. Richard Webber was played by James Pickens, Jr. Sara Ramirez portrayed orthopedic surgeon Dr. Calliope "Callie" Torres whose storylines during the season revolve around her recently discovered bisexuality. Eric Dane's character, plastic surgeon Dr. Mark Sloan, begins a relationship with intern Dr. Lexie Grey, Meredith's half-sister portrayed by Chyler Leigh. Brooke Smith appeared in 7 episodes as cardiothoracic surgeon Dr. Erica Hahn, Callie's love-interest, who eventually resigns and moves away. Patrick Dempsey portrayed neurosurgeon Dr. Derek Shepherd whose relationship with Meredith Grey is the series' main storyline.

Although originally introduced as a recurring character in the season premiere, trauma surgeon Dr. Owen Hunt was promoted to a series-regular in the fourteenth episode of the season "Beat Your Heart Out". He was portrayed by Kevin McKidd and was conceived as a love-interest to resident Cristina Yang. Originally only signed onto the show until December 2008, it was later announced Kevin McKidd would be promoted to regular status after his fifth episode on the series aired. He was promoted in the fourteenth episode "Beat Your Heart Out" after 11 guest star appearances. Shonda Rhimes said, "I am excited to have Kevin McKidd joining us for the season, he's been a delight to collaborate with and brings incredible passion, talent and creativity to his work." Weeks after Hunt's first appearance on the show, Matt Roush of TVGuide comments that "Hunt/McKidd is the most encouraging thing to happen to Grey's Anatomy in quite a while." Robert Rorke of the New York Post states that McKidd was brought in as Hunt to "boost the sagging fortunes" of the show's ratings. Kelley L. Carter of USA Today, describes Hunt as "hardcore" and "the antithesis of the other males on the show."

Numerous supporting characters have been given expansive and recurring appearances in the progressive storyline, including: Melissa George as Sadie Harris, Kimberly Elise as Dr. Jo Swender, Jessica Capshaw as Dr. Arizona Robbins, Amy Madigan as Dr. Wyatt, Mary McDonnell as Dr. Virginia Dixon, Eric Stoltz as William Dunn, Jennifer Westfeldt as Jen Harmon, Ben Shenkman as Rob Harmon, Shannon Lucio as Amanda and Samantha Mathis as Melinda. Héctor Elizondo returned as a guest star in the role of Carlos Torres, Callie's father. Private Practice guest star Grant Show portrays Dr. Archer Montgomery, the brother of former series-regular Dr. Dr. Addison Montgomery in one episode. Shannon Lucio portrays Amanda in the fifth season finale, a witness to the John Doe bus accident in the finale, and returns in the following season's two-part premiere "Good Mourning" and "Goodbye".

In the fifth season, 5 actors were given special guest-star billing, with 3 roles being reprised from a previous season. Jeffrey Dean Morgan returned as the deceased Denny Duquette in Izzie's hallucinations due to a brain tumor. Former series-regular Kate Walsh also returned as Dr. Addison Montgomery for two episodes ("Before and After", "An Honest Mistake") as part of a four-part crossover with her spin-off series, Private Practice. Her fellow cast member Audra McDonald reprises the role of Naomi Bennett from the third season two-parter "The Other Side of This Life", which functioned as a backdoor pilot for the spin-off. She replaces Merrin Dungey in the role, who was recast after the two-part episode aired. McDonald is joined by Taye Diggs as Sam Bennett, who portrays McDonald's ex-husband for the episode "Before and After" as part of the crossover event. Tyne Daly joined the series in the role of Carolyn Shepherd (née Maloney), Derek's mother in the episode "Sympathy for the Devil". This was Daly's only appearance in the series until the fifteenth season episode, "Good Shepherd", which aired in 2019.

== Reception ==
=== Ratings ===
Viewership and ratings per episode of Grey's Anatomy season 5
No.	Title	Air date	Rating/share (18–49)	Viewers (millions)
1	"Dream a Little Dream of Me (Part 1)"	September 25, 2008	7.4/18	18.47
2	"Dream a Little Dream of Me (Part 2)"	September 25, 2008	7.4/18	18.47
3	"Here Comes the Flood"	October 9, 2008	5.6/13	14.54
4	"Brave New World"	October 16, 2008	5.9/15	14.57
5	"There's No 'I' in Team"	October 23, 2008	5.4/13	14.21
6	"Life During Wartime"	October 30, 2008	5.7/14	15.05
7	"Rise Up"	November 6, 2008	6.0/14	15.63
8	"These Ties That Bind"	November 13, 2008	5.7/13	15.59
9	"In the Midnight Hour"	November 20, 2008	6.2/15	15.74
10	"All By Myself"	December 4, 2008	5.5/14	15.15
11	"Wish You Were Here"	January 8, 2009	5.2/12	13.71
12	"Sympathy for the Devil"	January 15, 2009	5.3/12	12.95
13	"Stairway to Heaven"	January 22, 2009	5.7/14	14.25
14	"Beat Your Heart Out"	February 5, 2009	5.8/14	15.20
15	"Before and After"	February 12, 2009	5.9/15	15.70
16	"An Honest Mistake"	February 19, 2009	5.9/15	15.39
17	"I Will Follow You Into the Dark"	March 12, 2009	5.0/12	13.54
18	"Stand By Me"	March 19, 2009	5.0/13	14.36
19	"Elevator Love Letter"	March 26, 2009	5.6/13	15.81
20	"Sweet Surrender"	April 23, 2009	5.0/13	13.22
21	"No Good at Saying Sorry (One More Chance)"	April 30, 2009	5.1/13	13.94
22	"What a Difference a Day Makes"	May 7, 2009	5.4/14	15.33
23	"Here's to Future Days"	May 14, 2009	5.9/16	15.58
24	"Now or Never"	May 14, 2009	5.9/16	17.12

=== Critical response ===
While few critics weighed in their point of view on the fourth season, several had opinions on the fifth season. Alan Sepinwall from the Newark Star-Ledger said "Overall, it really feels more like the good-old-days than Grey's has in a long time" referring to season 5. Also regarding season 5, Misha Davenport from Chicago Sun-Times said "Tonight's premiere hits on all the things the show does so well. There is romance, heartbreak, humor and a few moments that will move fans to tears." Robert Bianco from USA Today said "Happily, it now seems to have landed on solid ground, with its best ensemble and most-engaging stories in years" regarding the show's fifth season.

The return of Izzie's deceased fiancé Denny and the resumption of their romance during the season also proved unpopular with fans, and was deemed "the world's worst storyline" by Mary McNamara of the Los Angeles Times. McNamara was also critical of the episode "Now or Never", which saw Izzie flatline following neurosurgery, opining that Izzie ought to die. The episode in which Izzie married long-term love Alex received 15.3 million viewers, the largest television audience of the night.

Izzie's cancer storyline received a mixed response from the medical community. Otis Brawley, chief medical officer at the American Cancer Society, commented that Izzie's treatment options were unrealistic. Whereas in the show she was offered the drug interleukin-2, in reality the drug is never recommended to patients when melanoma has spread to the brain, as it can cause bleeding and strokes. Brawley explained that such patients would instead be offered radiosurgery. Conversely however, Tim Turnham, executive director of the Melanoma Research Foundation, praised Grey's Anatomy for bringing about greater public awareness of melanoma, stating: "We welcome the national spotlight Grey's Anatomy has created for melanoma and its efforts to encourage viewers to learn more about the importance of prevention, early detection and research."

Brooke Smith's departure as Erica Hahn also drew media attention during the season because it came shortly after the character came out as gay and became romantically involved with Callie Torres. Michael Ausiello of "Entertainment Weekly" described Callie and Erica as the series' "first-ever significant gay couple" and reported that Smith was "floored" by the decision to write out her character. Shonda Rhimes denied that Smith's exit was related to the character's sexuality.

=== Accolades ===
Chandra Wilson won the 2009 NAACP Outstanding Actress in a Drama Series for her portrayal of Dr. Miranda Bailey during the season.

== Home Media release ==
The fifth season was released as a widescreen 7-disc Region 1 DVD box set in the USA on September 15, 2009, with the title Grey's Anatomy: The Complete Fifth Season – More Moments. Each of these releases also contained DVD extras, including footage from behind-the-scenes, deleted scenes and extended episodes. For the U.S & Canada, a special limited box set edition of the season was released exclusively for Target Stores, this box set included an extra disc with over 100 minutes of additional bonus content, including more unaired scenes of the season and crossover episodes with the Grey's Spin-Off, Private Practice. The season was also released on November 4, 2009 in Region 4 and on August 23, 2010 in Region 2.

A 7-Disc Blu-ray set was originally going to release in Region A alongside the DVD version of the season on September 15, 2009, however, for unknown reasons the set was never released for the United States & Canada; but the set did get a release for Mexico & Central America on the same day their DVD's for the season came out. With this release, an exclusive extended version of the episode "Elevator Love Letter" was included among the rest of the special features. For Region B, the Blu-ray was also released, but only for Spain and France.

Grey's Anatomy: The Complete Fifth Season – More Moments
Set Details		Special Features
24 Episodes (1 extended); 7-Disc Set; English (Dolby Digital 5.1 Surround) (DVD); English (DTS-HD Master Audio 5.1 Surround) (Blu-ray); Subtitles: English SDH, Spanish & French; Audio Commentaries; Runtime: 1040 minutes (DVD), 1052 minutes (Blu-ray)		Extended Episode: "Stairway to Heaven"; Dissecting Grey's Anatomy - Unaired Scenes; Audio commentaries by Creator/Executive Producer Shonda Rhimes & Executive Producer Betsy Beers on several deleted scenes.; In Stitches: Season 5 Outtakes; 100th Episode: Tales From The O.R. - A Behind-The-Scenes Look At The Inner Workings Of Your Favorite Show; Heaven Sent - Actor Jeffrey Dean Morgan Talks About The Popularity Of His Character Denny Duquette; Grey's Anatomy - Starter Kit: Seasons 1 - 4 recap; Blu-ray exclusives; Additional "Expanded" Episode: "Elevator Love Letter"; Seasonplay exclusive feature
Release Dates
Region 1	Region 2	Region 4
September 15, 2009	August 23, 2010	November 4, 2009
