= Alex Karev =

Fictional character

- Grey's Anatomy character
- The season 9 promotional photograph of Justin Chambers as Dr. Alex Karev
- First appearance: "A Hard Day's Night" (1.01); March 27, 2005
- Last appearance: "Leave a Light On" (16.16); March 5, 2020 (Note: Justin Chambers narrates the episode in his final appearance and Alex is portrayed by a body double. His final physical appearance is in the episode "My Shot" (16.08), November 14, 2019.)
- Created by: Shonda Rhimes
- Portrayed by: Justin Chambers; Tommy O'Brien (younger self)

In-universe information
- Full name: Alexander Michael Karev
- Nickname: Evil Spawn/ Dr. Evil Spawn (given by Cristina Yang)
- Title(s): M.D., F.A.C.S.
- Occupation: Attending Pediatric Surgeon; Chief of Staff (Former); Interim Chief of Surgery (Former); Head of Pediatric Surgery (Former)
- Family: Jimmy Evans (father; deceased); Helen Karev (mother); Naomi Evans (stepmother); Aaron Karev (brother); Amber Karev (sister); Nicky Evans (half-brother)
- Spouses: Izzie Stevens (m. 2009, div. 2010; reconciled); Jo Wilson (m. 2018, div. 2020)
- Significant others: Callie Torres (one-night-stand); Olivia Jankovic (ex-affair); Addison Montgomery (one-night-stand); Rebecca Pope (ex-girlfriend); Lexie Grey (ex-girlfriend; deceased); Lucy Fields (ex-girlfriend); Heather Brooks (one-night-stand; deceased); Leah Murphy (one-night-stand)
- Children: Eli Stevens Karev; Alexis Stevens Karev
- Born: 1980
- Alma mater: University of Iowa

Alexander Michael "Alex" Karev (né Evans), M.D., F.A.C.S. is a fictional character on the ABC television series Grey's Anatomy, portrayed by actor Justin Chambers. Introduced as a surgical intern at the fictional Seattle Grace Hospital, Karev evolves throughout the series, obtaining the position of resident and eventually specializing as a pediatric surgeon. At one point, he also becomes the Interim Chief of Surgery for six months while Miranda Bailey (Chandra Wilson) is on a stress sabbatical. His relationships with colleagues Meredith Grey (Ellen Pompeo), Cristina Yang (Sandra Oh), Izzie Stevens (Katherine Heigl) and George O'Malley (T. R. Knight) form a central part of the show's early dynamics.

Initially, Karev is disliked by his fellow interns for his brusque and dismissive behavior towards patients and co-workers. His negative attitude and temper often bring him into conflict with the attending physicians. At one point, Addison Montgomery, the former neonatal surgeon, requests Alex on her service as punishment for his rude behaviour towards her and others, such as Derek Shepherd. This punishment leads to Alex demonstrating a remarkable talent for pediatric surgery, which shapes his career moving forward. As his character develops, Alex becomes more empathetic toward patients, particularly children, despite his initial claims of disliking them.

In the fifteenth-season premiere, Alex is appointed as interim Chief of Surgery after Bailey takes a sabbatical. In season 16, Alex leaves Grey Sloan Memorial Hospital to reunite with Izzie and their children, with his final appearance occurring in the episode titled "Leave a Light On".

== Storylines ==
Alex Karev had a troubled childhood shaped by his mother's mental illness and his father's frequent absences and violent behavior. Alex took up wrestling in high school as a way to defend himself and his mother, eventually confronting his father, leading to his father's permanent absence. Alex has two younger siblings, Aaron and Amber, and the three were placed in foster care for five years. While Aaron and Amber were placed with only a few families, Alex went through 17 foster families before reuniting with his siblings. Later, it is revealed that Aaron was diagnosed with schizophrenia and attempted to harm Amber, with Alex present when Aaron was committed to a psychiatric facility.

After graduating from the University of Iowa, Alex secured a spot in the surgical residency program at Seattle Grace Hospital. Initially, he made a poor impression on his fellow interns, Meredith Grey (Ellen Pompeo), Cristina Yang (Sandra Oh), Izzie Stevens (Katherine Heigl) and George O'Malley (T. R. Knight). He taunted Izzie after discovering she had worked as a lingerie model, but eventually, the two formed a friendship. Alex confided in Izzie about his father's heroin addiction and abusive behavior, revealing his motivations for becoming a wrestler to protect his mother. At the end of the first season, George contracts syphilis from Alex through their mutual involvement with nurse Olivia Harper, leading to significant animosity between the two.

Alex's initial relationship with Izzie faced challenges. After a failed date, due to Alex being preoccupied with his failed medical board exams, Izzie rejected him. Later, Alex experienced erectile dysfunction with Izzie, leading him to sleep with Olivia. Izzie caught him, causing them to break up. However, after passing his retaken exams and a bomb scare in the hospital, Alex and Izzie briefly reunited. Their relationship ultimately ended when Izzie fell in love with a patient, Denny Duquette.

Alex helps Izzie recover from Denny's death and attempts to rekindle their relationship, but Izzie pulls away, still grieving her loss. Despite the setback, they maintain their friendship. Alex spends time working with neonatal surgeon Dr. Addison Montgomery (Kate Walsh), and although he later shifts to working with plastic surgeon Dr. Mark Sloan (Eric Dane), his interest returns to Addison's specialty. Addison develops feelings for Alex, and the two eventually share a kiss and later sleep together.

Following a ferry accident, Alex rescues a pregnant woman with amnesia, later revealed to be Rebecca Pope (Elizabeth Reaser). She initially hides the fact that her memory has returned, fearing her troubled marriage. Alex helps her rediscover her identity, but ultimately turns her down after realizing she is married, feeling unworthy of her.

Rebecca returns, and she and Alex sleep together again before she goes back to her husband. Alex also has a brief relationship with intern Lexie Grey (Chyler Leigh), but chooses Rebecca when she tells him she is pregnant. However, after Rebecca's suicide attempt, Izzie convinces Alex to seek psychiatric help for her, as she begins hallucinating about the pregnancy. Alex later breaks down in Izzie's arms, and they share a kiss.

As Izzie and Alex's relationship grows, Izzie begins experiencing hallucinations of Denny, eventually revealing she has Stage 4 metastatic melanoma with an estimated 5% chance of survival. It is discovered that her hallucinations of Denny are caused by her brain tumor. Despite being devastated by the news, Alex stands by her. Izzie plans Meredith and Derek's wedding, but when Derek discovers another inoperable tumor in Izzie's brain, the couple gives their wedding to Izzie and Alex. They marry in front of all their friends, and Alex, though fearful, supports her decision to undergo a risky surgery. After Izzie flatlines, Alex desperately performs CPR in an attempt to save her life.

Izzie returns to work at Seattle Grace but is soon fired after making a treatment error that endangered a patient's life. She leaves a Dear John letter for Alex, providing no clue to her whereabouts. She later returns to the hospital to reconcile after learning that Alex wasn't the reason for her firing. Izzie reveals that her cancer is in remission, and though Alex expresses happiness for her, he tells her that he deserves someone who will stay. Izzie leaves Seattle once again, this time for good, and later sends Alex divorce papers.

Following Izzie's departure, Alex rekindles his relationship with Lexie. At this point in his career, Alex realizes that his true calling is in pediatrics rather than plastics, which he had previously pursued. His ability to work well with children draws the attention of Dr. Arizona Robbins, who offers to mentor him in pediatric surgery. When Alex's brother Aaron comes to Seattle Grace for surgery, painful memories from their difficult childhood resurface, and it is revealed that Alex and his siblings spent five years in foster care due to their mother's inability to care for them.

During a hospital shooting, Alex is gravely injured but survives with the help of Lexie and Mark. While undergoing treatment, Alex asks for Izzie, expressing his lingering feelings for her. However, after Lexie experiences a mental breakdown, Alex distances himself. Dr. Miranda Bailey insists Alex cannot return to surgery until the bullet from the shooting is removed, which Alex finally allows her to do. After recovering, Alex focuses on his pediatric career and begins treating children, showcasing his talent in handling young patients. He clashes with new pediatric attending Dr. Robert Stark while Arizona is on leave but is thrilled when she returns from Africa.

Alex starts a relationship with Dr. Lucy Fields, an OB-GYN attending, after she kisses him. However, their relationship is short-lived as Alex's ambition leads him to sabotage Meredith's Alzheimer's clinical trial in an attempt to secure the position of Chief Resident. This action results in Meredith losing the chance to adopt Zola. Alex later aplane that later crashes, Alex decides to stay at Seattle Grace, realizing his loyalty to his colleagues.

After the crash, Arizona's health deteriorates, leading to the amputation of her leg. Alex extends his stay at Seattle Grace until a replacement for Arizona is found. When he learns that the replacement would send the exchange program to UCLA, Alex decides to remain at Seattle Grace permanently. He buys Meredith's old house, where he lives with Cristina. Alex eventually forms a close friendship with intern Jo Wilson, which develops into romantic feelings. He admits his love for Jo, and they become a couple.

Alex's estranged father, Jimmy, reappears in Alex's life when he is admitted to the ER as a patient. Unaware that Alex is his son, Jimmy confides in himpologizes to Meredith, and she forgives him.

As the end of residency approaches, Alex prepares for his board exams, although he is late for his exam due to treating a patient. He passes the boards, and Dr. Webber informs him that Johns Hopkins Hospital, the top program in the country, has been impressed with him and created a position for him in pediatric surgery, which Alex accepts. However, when Arizona yells at him and takes his place on a about the family he abandoned years ago. This angers Alex, leading him to punch Jimmy at a bar. Later, Jimmy returns to the hospital, suffering from withdrawal symptoms and hallucinations, which reveal more about Alex's difficult childhood. Eventually, Jimmy recognizes Alex as his son, and the two argue. Jimmy goes into cardiac arrest and is brought into surgery, where Dr. Shane Ross, still haunted by Dr. Brooks' death, makes a critical mistake that damages Jimmy's heart. This leads to Jimmy's death, but before he passes, Alex lies to him, saying that his estranged family knows he loves them and are on their way to see him. Jimmy dies peacefully, believing Alex's comforting words. That same night, Alex kisses Jo at April's wedding, expressing his desire to start a family, but is deeply upset by his father's death due to Ross' error. Alex later confronts Ross, punching him, and is comforted by Meredith.

After completing his fellowship in Pediatric Surgery, Alex is offered a job at Dr. Oliver Lebackes' private practice, where he would have more flexible hours and a large salary. However, Alex soon realizes he is unhappy in the private practice setting and wishes to return full-time to Grey Sloan Memorial. When Cristina leaves for Switzerland, she gifts Alex her shares of the hospital board, along with her seat. However, Dr. Richard Webber recommends Bailey for the seat, leading to a competitive rivalry between Alex and Bailey. They both present their cases to the board, and Bailey ultimately wins the position with a unanimous vote.

Alex is later fired by Dr. Lebackes after Dr. Maggie Pierce accidentally reveals Alex's plans to leave. He is rehired at Grey Sloan as a full-time attending pediatric surgeon and takes over Arizona's position when she begins a fellowship with Dr. Nicole Herman. Throughout this period, Alex continues his relationship with Jo, while his bond with Meredith strengthens, becoming her new "person". When Derek dies and Meredith disappears without telling anyone, Alex is hurt by her actions and calls her every day, eventually receiving a call back, where she reassures him that she is okay.

Alex is by Meredith's side when she gives birth to her third child, Ellis Shepherd, as he is her emergency contact. She later asks to move back into her old house with him, and Alex agrees, selling the house back to her. He and Jo then rent a loft together. In the third episode of season 12, Jo discovers an invoice from a fertility clinic, revealing that Alex and Izzie still have frozen embryos. This discovery makes Jo jealous, as she struggles with the idea that Alex had once planned to have children with Izzie.

Alex and Jo's relationship continues to face challenges. When Alex proposes, Jo reveals she can't marry him, leading to their breakup. Eventually, Alex realizes he misses Jo, and they reconcile. Things seem to improve until marriage is brought up again, causing another fight. Alex is frustrated by Jo's continued refusal to marry him and storms out, leaving the relationship in an uncertain state. During Owen and Amelia's wedding, Alex reflects on love, telling Meredith that Izzie was his "Derek", his one true love. Meredith disagrees but supports him. Alex then decides that despite Jo's reluctance to marry him, he still loves her and goes back to their loft, only to find Jo intoxicated and Andrew DeLuca on top of her. Misinterpreting the situation, Alex believes Deluca is taking advantage of Jo and brutally beats him.

Realizing the severity of Deluca's injuries, Alex rushes him to the hospital, where the doctors call the police. Alex lies, claiming he found Deluca in that state, but both Ben Warren and Meredith quickly suspect the truth. Meredith covers for Alex initially, but eventually, he turns himself in and is arrested for aggravated assault. After being bailed out by Meredith, Alex is suspended from his attending position by Bailey and is reassigned to work in the clinic while awaiting trial.

During this time, Jo confesses to Alex that the reason she couldn't marry him is that she is already married. She reveals that her husband was abusive, and she had run away, changing her name to Jo Wilson to escape him. Fearing that Jo's past would be exposed during the trial, potentially alerting her abusive husband to her whereabouts, Alex decides to take a plea deal, which would result in him going to jail for two years. However, Meredith begs him not to take the deal, saying she can't bear to lose him too.

Unexpectedly, Deluca drops all charges against Alex, allowing him to return to work. Although Alex and Jo try to ignore each other at first, they slowly rebuild a fragile understanding. Alex and Deluca remain at odds, but as the season progresses, Alex hires a private investigator to track down Jo's abusive husband. When Alex finds him at a conference, he considers confronting him but ultimately decides against it, choosing not to risk Jo's safety or his own by exposing her identity or escalating the situation further.

At the start of season 14, Alex and Jo begin to reconcile. Jo confides in Deluca that she is still in love with Alex. Alex later approaches Jo, explaining that he understands her trauma because he experienced similar abuse as a child at the hands of his father. He then reveals that he found her abusive husband but assures her that he didn't harm him, which relieves Jo and strengthens her trust in Alex. Encouraged, Jo decides to file for divorce from her husband, and she and Alex restart their relationship. In episode seven, Alex is momentarily taken aback when he encounters a pregnant woman who resembles Izzie, causing him to stammer. In episode twenty-two, Alex learns that his mother has not been cashing the checks he's been sending her. When he visits her in Iowa, he discovers that she is doing well. Initially angry that she is fine despite his difficult childhood, Alex ultimately forgives her after talking with Jo and invites her to Seattle for his wedding. In the season finale, Alex and Jo finally get married.

In season 15, Alex and Jo plan to move to Boston for Jo's fellowship, but she decides to stay at Grey-Sloan Memorial Hospital. Meanwhile, Dr. Bailey takes a sabbatical, and Alex is appointed as the interim Chief of Grey-Sloan for six months. Jo then learns that her birth mother lives in Pittsburgh and visits her, but upon returning, she becomes distant, stops going to work, and worries Alex. He later learns about her struggles with mental health and supports her as she checks into rehab for a month. During this time, Jo gives Alex the option to end their relationship since their marriage was not legally binding, but Alex chooses to stay by her side. Additionally, Alex assists Meredith in committing insurance fraud to save a patient's life, which results in him being fired from his position as the head of pediatric surgery.

In season 16, Alex remarries Jo and helps Meredith avoid losing her medical license. However, midway through the season, Alex disappears to Iowa under the pretense of visiting his mother. In the episode "Leave a Light On", it is revealed that Alex had reconnected with Izzie in the weeks leading up to Meredith's trial. He reached out to her to see if she would support Meredith during the proceedings. During their conversation, Alex hears two children's voices in the background and discovers that Izzie had used the embryos they had frozen during her cancer treatment to have children through IVF. Realizing that he is the father of her kids, Alex ultimately decides to leave Jo and moves to Kansas to be with Izzie and their children.

== Development ==
=== Casting and creation ===
Alex Karev, portrayed by Justin Chambers, was not originally included in the pilot episode of Grey's Anatomy, which was filmed in March 2004. Tony Phelan, one of the show's writers, explained: "One of the notes after the pilot test was: 'You need a bad boy. You need a male member of the intern class who's not just an asshole, but male.'" As a result, Phelan added, "If you go back and watch the pilot, you can see how they surgically put Justin in everywhere."

On January 10, 2020, Chambers announced his departure from the series after 15 years, stating that he wanted to pursue other acting opportunities and focus on his family. His final appearance aired on November 14, 2019. The fate of his character was addressed in the season 16 episode titled "Leave a Light On".

=== Characterization ===
The American Broadcasting Company (ABC) characterized Karev as "honest" and someone who "always tells it like it is," while also noting his weaknesses, such as his blunt mouth, punctuality issues, and being a "smart-ass". Grey's Anatomy creator Shonda Rhimes commented on Karev's complexity, saying, "I love that we have a character who can do something wonderful but still be a selfish cranky ass about it. Alex gets to be complex in ways most characters don't because even though he's got a moral code, his moral code is totally twisted and dark. But he's essentially good—deep down inside". Carolina Paiz, one of the show's writers, added: "He has so much going on inside... you think you've got him figured out but then he just reveals this whole other side to him".

Initially described as a "superficial sleazeball" who evolves into a "nice guy and a talented doctor with an amazing bedside manner", Karev's journey also saw him become a love interest for Katherine Heigl's character, Izzie Stevens. His character development in the Season 4 was noted by DVD Verdict, which stated: "Love him, hate him, or both, Karev speaks his mind, rough edges and all. But ultimately his cold heart seems to be softened by his blossoming relationship with Jane Doe/Ava/Rebecca". Rhimes believed that Karev's transformation was evident in the 100th episode, where he marries Izzie: "Look at him. Standing at the altar and saying those vows like a man... He's become a man who can step up. And I love him for it".

=== Relationships ===
Although Alex Karev and Isobel Stevens had an on-off romantic history in earlier seasons of Grey's Anatomy, it wasn't until Season 5 that the two formed a lasting relationship. Despite Izzie's battle with advanced skin cancer, the two eventually marry. Justin Chambers, who portrayed Karev, commented on his character's struggle to express his feelings, particularly in the early stages of their relationship, stating that Karev finds it difficult to say "I love you".

While Stevens departs in Season 6, series creator Shonda Rhimes expressed an interest in bringing closure to both characters' storylines. However, she later retracted her statement, confirming that she had no plans to revisit Izzie's storyline.

In Season 9, Karev develops a close friendship with intern Jo Wilson, which turns into a romantic relationship by Season 10. After breaking up in Season 12, they reconcile and marry in Season 14. However, Season 16, Karev leaves Jo and reunites with his ex-wife, Izzie, after discovering they have children together.

== Reception ==
In analyzing Karev's character on Grey's Anatomy, Rachel Simon described him as "underrated", highlighting his significant personal growth over the series. Simon pointed out that Alex begins the show as an "arrogant, obnoxious intern," who often pushes away those who care about him. He consistently hurts Izzie and treats others poorly, yet over 10 seasons, Alex evolves in a "slow and realistic" way into a genuinely good person. Despite his flaws, his better qualities begin to shine through, even though his growth often goes unacknowledged.

Alan Sepinwall, a former columnist for The Star-Ledger, criticized Alex's flirtation with Addison Montgomery, arguing that "he should take interest in a woman's specialty and respect his boss without getting in her pants." However, as Alex's character developed, critics began to appreciate his deeper layers. Chris Monfette of IGN noted the emotional depth added to Alex's character in Season 5, especially through his relationship with Izzie Stevens. Monfette praised his scenes with Izzie toward the end of the season as some of "his character's best material yet."

Regarding his career as a pediatric surgeon, Examiner acknowledged Alex's "child-like innocence and need for acceptance," which, despite his rough exterior, helped him connect with children on various levels. The publication also explored the roots of his "major trust issues," linking them to his tumultuous childhood, including the physical abuse from his father, his mother's mental illness, and the instability of being shuffled through 17 foster homes over five years. With such a background, Alex's issues with trust were seen as deeply ingrained but slowly overcome as he matured.

== Awards ==
In 2006, Chambers was part of the ensemble cast that won the Satellite Award for Best Cast – Television Series. He was also part of the ensemble cast nominated for the Screen Actors Guild Award for Outstanding Performance by an Ensemble in a Drama Series from 2006 to 2008, with a victory in 2007. Chambers was nominated for the Teen Choice Award for Choice TV Breakout Performance in 2005, in addition to winning Favorite Dramatic TV Actor in 2017.
