= Erica Hahn =

Fictional character

- Grey's Anatomy character
- Brooke Smith as Dr. Erica Hahn
- First appearance: "17 Seconds" (2.25); May 14, 2006 (as recurring cast) "Haunt You Everyday" (4.05); October 25, 2007 (as series regular)
- Last appearance: "Rise Up" (5.07); November 6, 2008
- Created by: Shonda Rhimes
- Portrayed by: Brooke Smith

In-universe information
- Title(s): M.D. F.A.C.S.
- Occupation: Attending cardiothoracic surgeon at Seattle Grace Hospital
- Significant other: Callie Torres (dated)
- Alma mater: Johns Hopkins University (MD)

Erica Hahn, M.D., F.A.C.S. is a fictional character from the American Broadcasting Company (ABC) medical drama television series Grey's Anatomy, portrayed by actress Brooke Smith. Hahn was a recurring character through the show's second and third seasons, and joined the main cast in the fourth season. Prior to assuming the role, Smith observed heart surgery being performed, and admitted to finding it stressful to continually portray a medical professional realistically.

Hahn's character is presented as highly professional, to the point of being a "workaholic". She is notably hard on Resident Cristina Yang (Sandra Oh), admitting that Cristina reminds her of herself as a student. Despite her intentions to keep away from relationships, she becomes romantically involved with orthopedic surgeon Callie Torres (Sara Ramirez). The storyline was praised for its realistic portrayal of a developing same-sex relationship between two women, although consultants from the Gay & Lesbian Alliance Against Defamation expressed some concerns over what they deemed the somewhat exploitative talk of a threesome between Hahn, Torres and Mark Sloan. Hahn was written out of Grey's Anatomy in November 2008, with Smith commenting that the decision originated with the ABC network rather than with series creator Shonda Rhimes.

== Storylines ==
Upon Hahn's first appearance in Grey's Anatomy, it is established that she is a long-time rival of fellow cardiothoracic surgeon Preston Burke (Isaiah Washington). Their rivalry dates back to their days at Johns Hopkins School of Medicine, where Hahn graduated second, just behind Burke. She is introduced as a cardiothoracic attending surgeon at Seattle Presbyterian Hospital when she and Burke clash over a donor heart. Hahn reappears in Season 3 when George O'Malley (T. R. Knight) contacts her for a consult on his father's valve replacement, after George discovers Burke's hand tremors and Cristina Yang (Sandra Oh) helping him cover them up.

In Season 4, Hahn transfers to Seattle Grace Hospital in the episode "Haunt You Everyday" after performing a successful heart transplant at the request of Chief of Surgery Richard Webber (James Pickens Jr.). She takes over Burke’s former position as Seattle Grace’s Head of Cardiothoracic Surgery. Hahn immediately cultivates an antagonistic relationship with Burke's former protégée, Cristina, frequently refusing to let her scrub in on surgeries and critiquing her overly enthusiastic behavior. Later, Hahn confesses to Addison Montgomery (Kate Walsh) that she is purposely hard on Cristina because she sees her younger self in Cristina.

Hahn deflects the romantic attention of fellow attending surgeon Mark Sloan (Eric Dane), admitting she finds him attractive but prefers to keep her personal and professional lives separate. She also forms a close friendship with Callie Torres (Sara Ramirez), which becomes strained when Callie begins to suspect that Hahn has romantic feelings for her. Initially, Hahn laughs off the suggestion, but later kisses Callie in front of Sloan to prove that he couldn't handle a threesome with them, leaving Callie shocked. In the Season 4 finale, Callie initiates another kiss, which Hahn reciprocates.

In Season 5, As Erica Hahn's relationship with Callie Torres progresses, the two struggle with their differences in approaching the relationship. While Hahn quickly comes to terms with her sexuality, Callie finds herself confused and conflicted. This tension culminates when Callie, uncertain about her feelings, sleeps with Mark to explore her own physical attraction to women and her ability to connect with Hahn. Despite these challenges, Hahn remains committed to making the relationship work.

Hahn is deeply shaken by a case involving an organ transplant mix-up. She realizes that her moral and ethical standards are in stark contrast to the behavior she witnesses at Seattle Grace, specifically referencing Izzie Stevens' (Katherine Heigl) involvement in the Denny Duquette (Jeffrey Dean Morgan) case. Hahn expresses her frustration and disillusionment with the hospital, declaring that she no longer feels comfortable working there. After a tense conversation with Callie, in which they argue about their differing views on the relationship, Hahn walks away and drives off, leaving both Callie and the hospital behind.

== Development ==
=== Casting and creation ===
Erica Hahn was initially conceived as a minor character and an occasional guest-star, primarily as a rival to Preston Burke (Isaiah Washington). The character first appeared in three episodes of Grey's Anatomy's second season and returned for two more episodes in the third season. Reflecting on her initial role, Brooke Smith, who portrayed Hahn, admitted she didn't expect the character to become a mainstay on the show. Smith humorously noted, "I didn't really think it was going to work out," and joked, "After every time I would hope that they would call and also hope not too—kind of like when I used to be single."

However, after Washington's departure from the show, Hahn was brought back as a main character in the fourth season, stepping into Burke's role as Seattle Grace's Head of Cardiothoracic Surgery. Smith revealed that she was surprised by the full-time offer and had kept her expectations low to avoid disappointment. A key factor in her decision to return as a series regular was the opportunity to explore Dr. Hahn’s character in greater depth. She explained: "When I work on something that has a beginning, middle, and end, I can create an arc. With Dr. Hahn, I need to figure out who she is."

In preparation for her role, Smith took her research seriously. She observed a heart surgery being performed and worked closely with the surgical nurses employed by the show's producers to ensure the operating room scenes were portrayed realistically. Smith confessed that this process was stressful, saying, "I got very neurotic about the fact that I didn’t go to medical school. I’m not actually a doctor." She elaborated, "I have no idea what it really is to be a surgeon and yet I have to act like I am really good at it. I have to look like I’ve been doing it a long time."

On November 3, 2008, it was reported by Entertainment Weekly's Michael Ausiello that Erica would depart from Grey's Anatomy on November 6. Series creator Shonda Rhimes issued the statement that:

Brooke Smith was obviously not fired for playing a lesbian. Clearly it's not an issue as we have a lesbian character on the show – Calliope Torres. Sara Ramirez is an incredible comedic and dramatic actress and we wanted to be able to play up her magic. Unfortunately, we did not find that the magic and chemistry with Brooke's character would sustain in the long run. The impact of the Callie/Erica relationship will be felt and played out in a story for Callie. I believe it belittles the relationship to simply replace Erica with 'another lesbian.' If you'll remember, Cristina mourned the loss of Burke for a full season.

E! Online's Kristin Dos Santos reported that Smith's dismissal from Grey's Anatomy was enforced by the ABC network, allegedly as part of an attempt to "de-gay" the show. In addition to writing out Smith's character, Dr. Erica Hahn, it was revealed that Grey's Anatomy newcomer Melissa George, who had initially been announced to play a bisexual character, would no longer be portraying her character as bisexual. This decision sparked controversy and speculation that the network was uncomfortable with the LGBTQ storylines, particularly the developing same-sex relationship between Hahn and Callie Torres (Sara Ramirez). Brooke Smith, interviewed by Michael Ausiello, stated that:

I was very excited when they told me that Erica and Callie were going to have this relationship. And I really hoped we were going to show what happens when two women fall in love and that they were going to treat it like any heterosexual couple on TV. And so I was surprised and disappointed when they just suddenly told me that they couldn't write for my character anymore. [...] I found out in mid-September soon after shooting the monologue that aired last week where Erica has the revelation that she's gay. They even came down and told me it was a great scene – one of the best they ever shot on the show. So I was really, really shocked. I was floored when they told me [I was being let go]. It was the last thing I expected. In fact, when they told me I asked, "When is this happening?" And they said, "The [next episode] is your last," which is the one that airs this Thursday. So it was very sudden.

Smith explained that the script for her final episode of Grey's Anatomy did not clearly indicate that her character was being written out. In her last scene, Erica is simply seen walking to her car, leaving the storyline unresolved. Smith acknowledged that her dismissal was likely driven by the ABC network rather than series creator Shonda Rhimes, stating: "It definitely seemed like [Shonda's] hands were tied." Rhimes also addressed the situation, stating, "We didn't have a controversy with Dr. Hahn. The press created a whole thing that had nothing to do with reality."

=== Characterization ===
Smith described her character, Dr. Erica Hahn, as a dedicated workaholic who maintained strict professionalism, saying, "Erica is a workaholic and she's very professional [...] I think she feels that there should be professionalism at work, and when other people do things that aren't professional, she gets a little upset." Smith explained that Hahn had "little rules in her head about how you’re supposed to act at work", which others should follow, even if she occasionally broke them herself. Stacy McKee, who wrote the Season 4 episode "Kung Fu Fighting", in which Hahn was established as a main character, characterized her as "hardcore" and "a kick-ass female surgeon."

Smith was fine with Hahn not being particularly likable at first, stating that the show’s writers wanted to avoid rushing into making her a fan-favorite. "A lot of actors don’t want to be unlikable, even if they’re the bad guy. But I’m okay with that—I'm good with being unlikable," Smith said. Shonda Rhimes, the show's creator, reflected on Hahn's tough approach to mentoring Cristina Yang (Sandra Oh), noting that Hahn was a brilliant surgeon but could benefit from more "loving care" in her teaching methods. Rhimes also added that Hahn had come from a surgical world with even fewer women than in the present, which contributed to her "dog eat dog" mentality.

Initially, Hahn was rebuffed by plastic surgeon Mark Sloan (Eric Dane), who expressed romantic interest in her. Hahn, however, preferred to keep her personal and professional lives separate. Smith humorously commented, "She came to the wrong hospital if she thought she wasn’t going to have a personal life!" Both Smith and her co-star Sandra Oh had pushed for a potential lesbian storyline between Hahn and Cristina, having previously played lovers in the play Stop Kiss. Smith joked with TV Guide that Hahn would make an "awesome lesbian", and although the producers were receptive, they didn’t immediately pursue that storyline.

Despite initial hesitation from Rhimes, who felt it was "too obvious" for a strong, powerful woman like Hahn to be a lesbian, the character’s romantic arc with orthopedic surgeon Callie Torres (Sara Ramirez) began at the end of Season 4. The relationship, dubbed "Callica" by Entertainment Weekly, became a significant and groundbreaking storyline. Rhimes explained that the writers wanted to explore the relationship in a real and meaningful way, "not some stunt to get people talking." The goal was to depict what could happen if a woman suddenly developed feelings for another woman, treating it like any other relationship on the show.

Callie and Erica’s kiss at the end of the Season 4 finale marked a historic moment, as they became the only regular lesbian or bisexual female characters on network television at the time. To ensure that the portrayal of their relationship was authentic, the show's producers consulted with GLAAD and invited consultants like Trish Doolan and Nikki Weiss to workshop sessions. The consultants praised the producers' dedication to realism and the chemistry between Smith and Ramirez, remarking that the development of their relationship felt organic and genuine.

Smith herself was enthusiastic about the storyline, stating, "I was psyched. I thought it was a great idea." However, she admitted that much of Erica's romantic backstory remained vague, both in the writers' vision and in her own interpretation of the character. She imagined that while Hahn might have had a crush on a woman in high school or college, the relationship with Callie was likely her first real same-sex experience.

When asked about the controversial scene in which Callie sleeps with Mark Sloan as "practice" for her relationship with Hahn, Smith expressed some discomfort, calling the moment "a little icky" and adding, "If you're a woman, don't you know how to please yourself?"

Following the announcement that Erica Hahn would be written out of Grey's Anatomy, Smith reflected on the direction of the storyline, saying, "I was starting to get there, yeah. I was personally a little impatient with the gay panic, but it was more Callie's thing anyway. I think Dr. Hahn was sort of figuring it out." Smith’s exit from the series came as a shock to fans, as her final scene simply showed Hahn walking to her car, leaving her fate unresolved. Smith later revealed that the decision to write her out of the show was made by ABC, not Shonda Rhimes, with the network allegedly uncomfortable with the LGBTQ storyline.

== Reception ==
Mary Macnamara of the Los Angeles Times praised Hahn's character, writing, "Hahn is a terrific character, sassy and professional, with an appropriately acerbic view of the various romantic shenanigans." Macnamara added that Hahn seemed to act as a stand-in for viewers "choking on the soapy silt of last season", suggesting that the writers used her character to move the show forward while maintaining its brand. She humorously noted that Smith may have been carrying the future of TV's once highest-rated drama in her hands.

The depiction of Hahn’s relationship with Callie Torres was also met with largely positive reviews. AfterEllen commended the storyline for offering the drama Grey's Anatomy is known for, as well as a rare "truthfulness" in its portrayal of lesbian relationships, despite some exploitative moments. GLAAD consultants Trish Doolan and Nikki Weiss praised the effort the writers and actors put into researching the storyline but were more critical of the scene where Hahn kisses Callie in front of Mark Sloan, feeling it seemed forced and more like a conquest for Mark. Weiss commented, "I just felt like, if they really cared about each other, I don't think they would do that as a stunt." AfterEllen.com also criticized the editing, which frequently cut to Mark’s point of view, privileging the "male gaze".

Smith, however, refuted the interpretation that the scene was exploitative. She explained that when playing the scene, she intended it as a challenge to Mark’s assumption that he could have both women. She stated, "You think that if you walked in the room and we were together, we would just be on you, but we wouldn't. So that's why I kissed her." Smith believed the moment reflected the competition between her character and the male surgeons, reinforcing that Mark wouldn't be able to intimidate her.

When it was announced that Hahn would be written out of Grey's Anatomy, Macnamara published a critical editorial, deeming the decision to fire Smith "a grim reminder that certain prejudices are still ascendant in television". She argued that gay characters on network television are often allowed to have sex only if part of a single-episode storyline, and that lesbian characters must fit a specific visual template—"sylphlike, gorgeous and preferably under 30." Macnamara expressed disappointment, suggesting that Smith's departure wasn't due to her character's lack of appeal, but because she "didn't fit the visual template of Grey's or most of network television." She concluded that while Sara Ramirez's "lipglossed lusciousness" made her beautiful enough to be bisexual, Smith was deemed "not beautiful enough to be gay" on network TV.

Dorothy Snarker of AfterEllen was similarly critical, explaining that Smith’s dismissal meant the loss of the only lesbian/bisexual couple on American primetime TV. She emphasized that it was the first significant gay relationship portrayed on Grey's Anatomy. Snarker lamented the decision, adding that "the handful of remaining lesbian/bisexual relationships on TV are on cable, premium channels, and daytime television." She also pointed to a broader industry trend by noting that another new character’s orientation had been changed from bisexual to heterosexual, calling it "a serious blow for queer women's visibility on the small screen." Snarker concluded by praising the organic and romantic nature of Callie and Erica's relationship and expressed disappointment that it had ended prematurely, remarking, "Now it seems all we’re left with is taillights."
