= George O'Malley =

Fictional character from Grey's Anatomy

- Grey's Anatomy character
- The Season 4 promotional photo of T. R. Knight as Dr. George O'Malley
- First appearance: "A Hard Day's Night" (1.01); March 27, 2005
- Last appearance: "Now or Never" (5.24); May 14, 2009 (as series regular) "You'll Never Walk Alone" (17.04); December 3, 2020 (as guest star)
- Created by: Shonda Rhimes
- Portrayed by: T. R. Knight

In-universe information
- Full name: George O'Malley
- Title: M.D.
- Occupation: Surgical resident at Seattle Grace Hospital
- Family: Louise O'Malley (mother); Harold O'Malley (father, deceased); Jerry and Ronnie O'Malley (brothers)
- Spouse: Callie Torres (m. 2007; div. 2008)
- Significant others: Olivia Jankovic (one-night-stand); Meredith Grey (one-night-stand); Izzie Stevens (ex-girlfriend)
- Religion: Catholicism
- Born: 1980
- Died: 2009
- Status: Deceased

George O'Malley, M.D., is a fictional character from the medical drama television series Grey's Anatomy, which airs on ABC in the United States. The character was created by series producer Shonda Rhimes and portrayed by actor T. R. Knight from 2005 to 2009. Introduced as a surgical intern at the fictional Seattle Grace Hospital, O'Malley worked his way up to the level of surgical resident. His relationships with his colleagues Meredith Grey (Ellen Pompeo), Cristina Yang (Sandra Oh), Izzie Stevens (Katherine Heigl) and Alex Karev (Justin Chambers) were a central aspect of the series. O'Malley married Callie Torres (Sara Ramirez), from whom he later separated to pursue a relationship with Stevens. He also briefly entertained romantic interests with Grey and Olivia Jankovic (Sarah Utterback).

Knight auditioned for the role, initially expecting it to be a one-season stint. In 2009, following the conclusion of Season 5, it was confirmed that Knight would not return for Season 6. The actor cited a "breakdown in communication" with Rhimes, his character's reduced screen time, and his decision to come out as gay as reasons for his departure.

Knight received positive reviews for his portrayal of O'Malley, garnering him a nomination for Outstanding Supporting Actor in a Drama Series at the 59th Primetime Emmy Awards in 2007. Despite this, the character's death received mixed reactions from both critics and audiences.

== Storylines ==
George O'Malley is introduced as a fellow surgical intern along with Meredith Grey (Ellen Pompeo), Cristina Yang (Sandra Oh), Izzie Stevens (Katherine Heigl) and Alex Karev (Justin Chambers); the 5 of them working under resident Miranda Bailey (Chandra Wilson). O'Malley and Stevens move in with Meredith, for whom he has unexpressed romantic feelings due to his fear of rejection and the fact that she and attending neurosurgeon Derek Shepherd (Patrick Dempsey) share mutual interest. On his first day as an intern, O'Malley is chosen by cardiothoracic surgery chief Preston Burke (Isaiah Washington) to perform the first surgery among the interns. He freezes in the operating room, earning the nickname "007" after almost killing a patient during a routine procedure—a reference to James Bond's "license to kill."

O'Malley dates nurse Olivia Jankovic (Sarah Utterback), but the relationship ends when he contracts syphilis from her, which she unknowingly contracted from Karev. Tensions rise between O'Malley and Karev after they become trapped in an elevator with a patient who begins to bleed out. While Karev freezes, O'Malley steps in and saves the patient. Eventually, O'Malley admits his feelings to Meredith, and the two have a one-night stand. However, Meredith confesses that it was a mistake, leading O'Malley to avoid her and pursue a relationship with orthopedic surgeon Callie Torres (Sara Ramirez).

During a camping trip, O'Malley discovers that Torres had a sexual encounter with the chief of plastic surgery, Mark Sloan (Eric Dane) and also uncovers that Burke is suffering from tremors in his hand. O'Malley's father is later diagnosed with esophageal cancer and a leaking aortic valve. O'Malley refuses to let Burke perform the surgery, instead opting for Burke's rival, Erica Hahn (Brooke Smith). His relationship with Torres becomes strained over the revelation about Sloan, but he allows her to support him as his father's health deteriorates. His father ultimately dies from complications, leading O'Malley to elope with Torres in Las Vegas as a way to cope with his grief. However, O'Malley soon realizes the marriage may have been a mistake and sleeps with Stevens while intoxicated. Stevens confesses her love for him, and O'Malley considers transferring to another hospital to avoid his feelings, though he is ineligible after failing his intern exams.

O'Malley decides to repeat his intern year and confesses his infidelity to Torres, leading to their separation. He briefly pursues a relationship with Stevens, but they soon realize they lack real chemistry. O'Malley moves in with new intern Lexie Grey (Chyler Leigh), Meredith's half-sister. When they discover O'Malley failed his exam by just one point, he confronts Richard Webber (James Pickens Jr.), the Chief of Surgery, and successfully retakes the exam. Although Lexie develops feelings for O'Malley, he begins to distance himself from her. O'Malley provides support for Stevens when she is diagnosed with melanoma and walks her down the aisle as she marries Karev.

O'Malley shows a natural talent for trauma surgery, and Owen Hunt (Kevin McKidd), the attending of trauma surgery, encourages him to pursue it as his specialty. O'Malley then surprises everyone by deciding to join the U.S. Army to serve in Iraq. While his friends at the hospital plan an intervention to convince him to stay, they work on a severely injured John Doe, a victim of a bus accident who saved a woman's life by pushing her out of the way. John Doe writes "007" on Meredith's hand, and she realizes that the disfigured patient is actually George. The team rushes to operate, but George ultimately flatlines and is declared brain-dead. Callie confirms his identity through a freckle on his hand. His organs are donated, and George is buried a week later.

== Development ==
=== Casting and creation ===
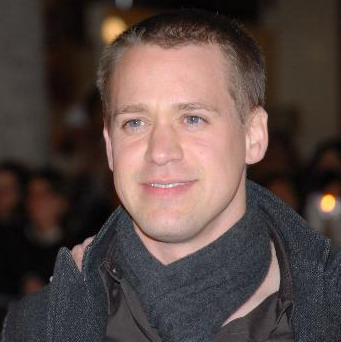
T. R. Knight expected a short career with Grey's Anatomy.

T. R. Knight signed on for the pilot of Grey's Anatomy as George O'Malley, expecting that the role might be short-lived because he appreciated the character's multi-faceted nature. In October 2006, news surfaced that Isaiah Washington had insulted Knight with a homophobic slur during an argument with co-star Patrick Dempsey. Shortly after the details of the incident became public, Knight disclosed that the slur prompted him to come out as gay. Reflecting on the experience, Knight said, "I was under no delusions. My friends on the set knew. We talked about it. Publicly it's not my thing to call up People Magazine and be like, 'Hey, you want to know something about me?'... I could've just let it slide and not said anything, but it became important. It became important to make the statement." The situation seemed somewhat resolved when Washington issued a public statement apologizing for his "unfortunate use of words during the recent incident on-set."

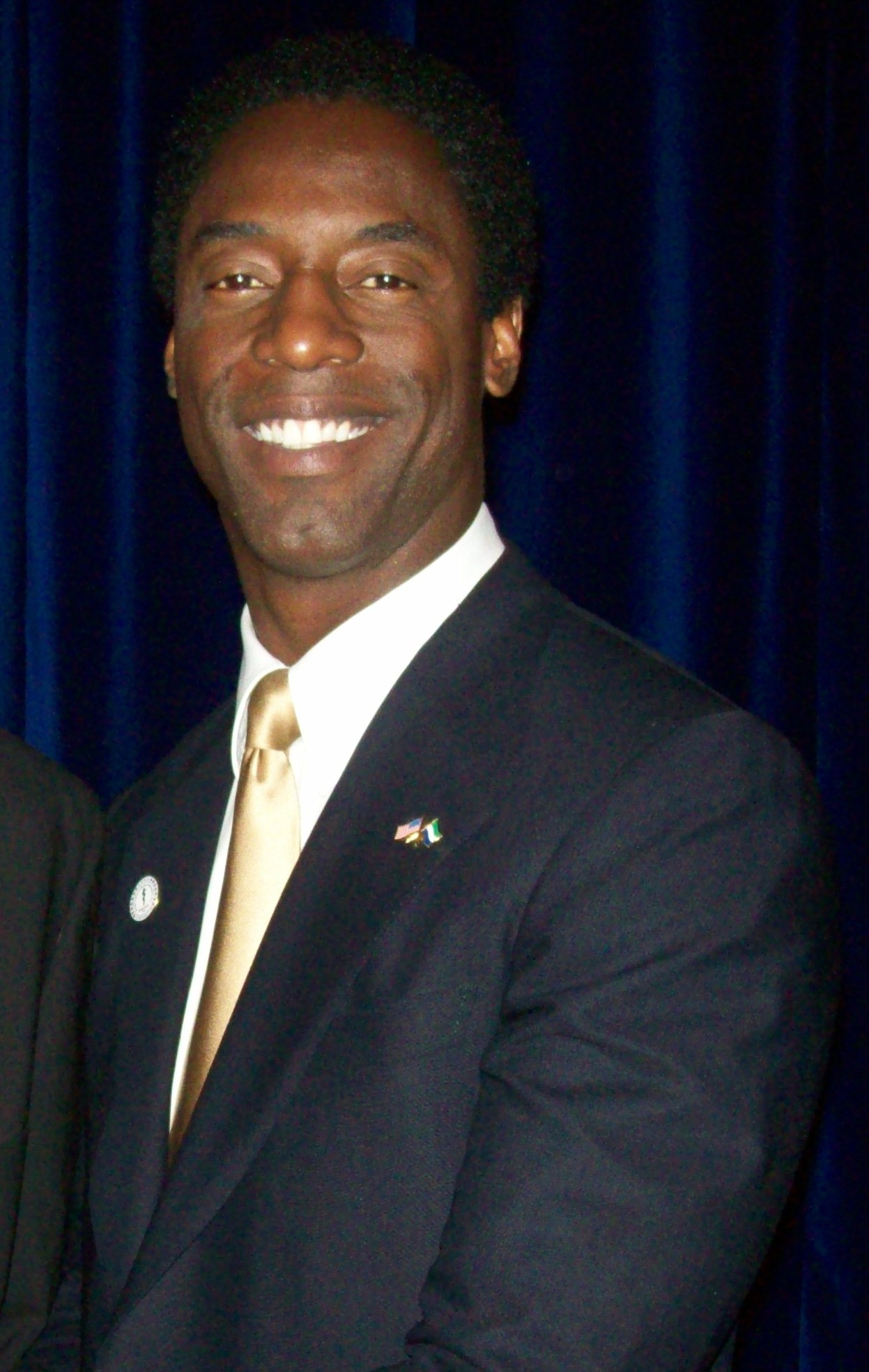
Isaiah Washington insulted T. R. Knight with a homophobic slur.

At the 64th Golden Globe Awards, while being interviewed on the red carpet, Washington joked, "I love gay. I wanted to be gay. Please let me be gay." Later, Washington claimed he never used the slur, labeling it as "vile". In June 2007, it was reported that the American Broadcasting Company (ABC) and series creator Shonda Rhimes had decided not to renew Washington's contract for Grey's Anatomy, though they did not immediately specify the reason. In a subsequent interview, Washington argued that "they fired the wrong guy" (referring to Knight) and revealed that he was considering filing a lawsuit over the incident. He also accused Knight of using the controversy to advance his own career and negotiate for a higher salary on the show.

On July 2, 2007, Washington appeared on Larry King Live to present his side of the controversy. He stated that he never used the "F-word" in reference to Knight but had blurted it out in an unrelated context during an argument "provoked" by Dempsey, claiming that Dempsey was treating him like a "B-word", a "P-word", and the "F-word"—terms Washington said conveyed "somebody who is being weak and afraid to fight back."

In 2009, Rhimes reflected on the incident during an interview with Entertainment Weekly, admitting that she might not have handled the situation perfectly. She explained, "I wasn't interested in what anybody thought publicly. I was interested in what was going on right here on the ground...with the people I work with every day. Did I do it perfectly? Of course not. This is my first television show. It was a learning experience." Knight also noted that Rhimes was among those who initially discouraged him from coming out, but Rhimes countered, saying, "I remember saying [to fellow executive producer], 'This is our proudest day here. T. R. got to come out, and I got to say to him that it wouldn't affect his character' because he was concerned that coming out would make George suddenly gay. The idea that a gay actor can't play a straight man is insulting."

In December 2008, reports began to circulate that Knight had requested to be released from his contract, and discussions about the terms were ongoing. By June 2009, following the conclusion of Grey's Anatomy's fifth season, it was confirmed that Knight would not be returning for the show's sixth season. Knight cited a "breakdown in communication" with series creator Shonda Rhimes, a lack of screen-time for his character, George O'Malley, as well as his decision to come out as openly gay, as factors contributing to his decision to leave. Before his departure was officially announced, there was speculation that the role of O'Malley would be recast, but Rhimes dismissed this idea, calling it a "hilarious, ridiculous rumor".

Upon confirming his exit, Knight expressed his thoughts in an interview with TV Guide, stating: "Leaving Grey's Anatomy was not an easy decision for me to make. I am extremely grateful to have had the opportunity to play this character and will miss my fellow cast and crew very much. I continue to wish them the very best, and wholeheartedly thank all of the fans who have supported me and the show with such passion and enthusiasm."

In her statement regarding Knight's departure, Rhimes said: "I think I speak for the entire Grey's Anatomy family when I say we wish T. R. Knight the best in his future endeavors. He is an incredibly talented actor and a person whose strength of character is admired by all of us."

There are ebbs and flows. And every season is shaped differently. With George, I really wanted you to not notice that he wasn't there for most of this episode. I don't think anybody noticed because of the way we laid it out this season. And, actually, he was really lovely and elegant about lying there in all that very painful makeup and prosthetics for much of the episode with no words. That moment where he grabs Meredith's hand is one of the most affecting moments of the episode, and it was without words.

— Rhimes on Knight's lack of screen time in season five

In an interview with Entertainment Weekly, Rhimes revealed that she had tried to dissuade Knight from leaving Grey's Anatomy. "I looked in his face and he was really sure. It felt like the right thing for him," she explained. However, in a separate interview, Knight expressed his reasons for leaving, stating: "My five-year experience proved to me that I could not trust any answer that was given [about O'Malley]." Despite the challenges, Knight felt "at peace" with his decision to exit the show, explaining: "There just comes a time when it's so clear that moving on is the best decision."

Katherine Heigl, Knight's close friend and co-star, attempted to persuade him to stay, saying: "I didn't think it was the right decision. I felt like some of the problems could be worked through. But by the time it came to fruition, I was [glad] for him because he was ready to go." Knight also addressed the perception of his decision to leave a high-paying contract, which was reportedly worth US$14 million. He said: "From an outsider's perspective, I get the [impression that] 'He's just a spoiled actor, he doesn't know how good he has it.' There are a lot of people who would like to be in my position. But in the end, I need to be fulfilled in my work."

=== Characterization ===
O'Malley was characterized as a "hapless naif." Regarding O'Malley's longtime crush on Meredith during the second season of Grey's Anatomy, Knight reflected: "What's going to be very interesting to see is what he's going to do with Meredith. It's getting close to time. Whatever he chooses to do will inform who he is the rest of his life." When the characters' sexual encounter occurred on-screen, Knight explained the complexities of the situation in an interview with Maureen Ryan of the Chicago Tribune: "George wasn't really paying full attention. He was letting his own feelings override his respect for Meredith. A person really clued in would get that there wasn't anything coming back, but he was so in his head about it and caught up in his own feelings that he wasn't listening. It's not just that he loves her... it's a kind of selfish love he had for her." Knight further elaborated on George's character development, stating, "I think George has a lot of growing up to do. Part of that is making horrible, stupid mistakes. He's been pretty sheltered."

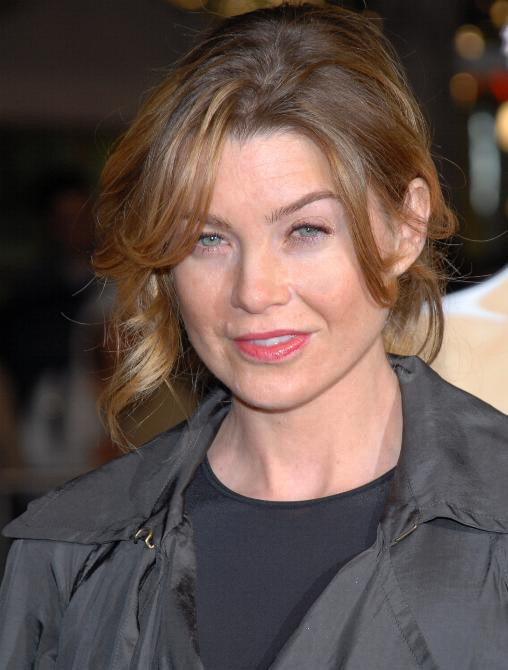
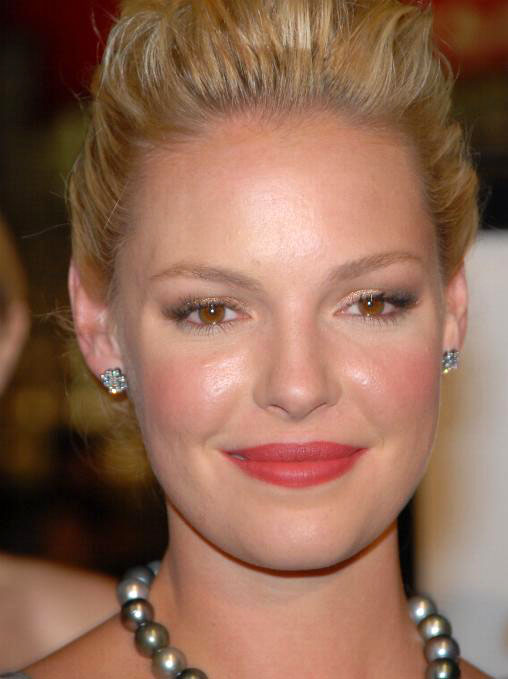
Ellen Pompeo's (left) and Katherine Heigl's (right) characters both have short-lived relationships with O'Malley.

Series writer Stacy McKee reflected on the significant impact of the sexual encounter between George and Meredith, stating: "There's no turning back. There's nothing George and Meredith can do. The damage is done – things will never be the same. They've just changed something important in their lives forever."

When asked if O'Malley was becoming more assertive, Knight said:

I think that's very true, especially since the elevator scene. The first time we saw George, he failed at an appendectomy, he failed very publicly. In the elevator scene, if he hadn't been in that elevator, if they had been in any other place, he would have let someone else step in and deal with it. The fact that it was only George and Alex forced him to act, it was either that or let this man die. He stepped up because he had to.

Knight also commented on O'Malley's lack of self-appreciation, noting that the character does not fully recognize his own positive traits. Reflecting on the pivotal moment when O'Malley performed open-heart surgery in an elevator, Knight explained: "It's a slow change, but he's starting to realize, 'The way I have been doing things is not working.' The big thing about the open-heart surgery in the elevator was he was forced into it. He needs to be kind of kicked in the [butt] to do these things."

Knight shared that he found a parallel between himself and George, particularly in how "confidence isn't always at its absolute highest," though he emphasized that he saw more differences than similarities between them. However, occasional moments of awkwardness would remind him of George's character: "I was walking, doing a scene with Katherine Heigl. I finished my line with her, and then I walked straight into the light stand."

Co-star Heigl was critical of Izzie and George's affair, expressing her disapproval: "They really hurt somebody, and they didn't seem to be taking a lot of responsibility for it. I have a really hard time with that kind of thing. I'm maybe a little too black and white about it."

Speaking about George's friendship with Lexie, Rhimes commented: "I love them as friends. They make good friends. We all have that friend we met in school or the gym or somewhere – we just hit it off right away. And right away there was no pretense or airs. Just pure honesty. That's Lexie and George. They're really good friends, and I can see the friendship evolving into something even greater."

When asked about his "favorite George moment", Knight highlighted his relationships with Izzie and Bailey as particularly memorable aspects of his character's journey.

== Reception ==
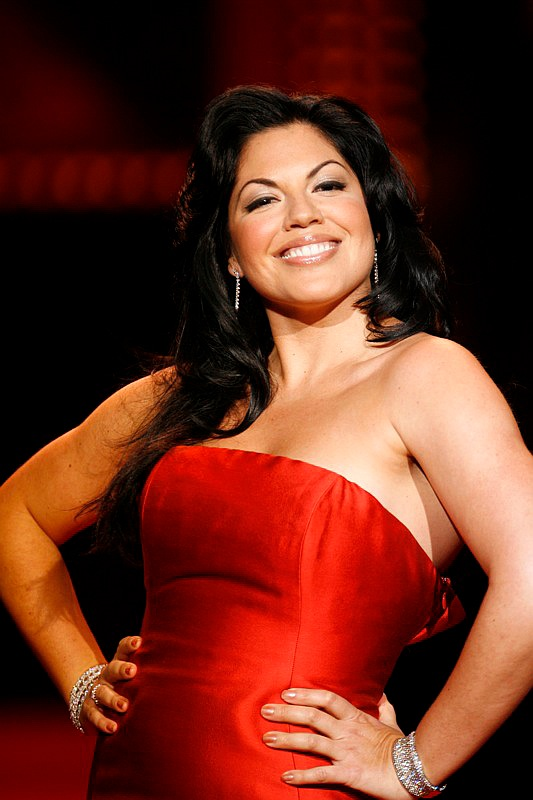
Callie Torres' relationship with O'Malley was initially criticized.

Fans were widely against O'Malley's affair with Meredith in the second season; however, certain fans who supported their relationship were critical when Callie Torres was introduced as a love interest for him. O'Malley's relationship with Stevens in the fourth season also faced backlash from both fans and critics. Maclean's wrote: "George must die. He's slept with virtually everyone except the male cast and has been in love with virtually everyone except the male cast. And he's not that great of a doctor. Evolve or die." Christopher Monfette of IGN said O'Malley and Stevens were a "mismatch," adding: "Unfortunately, while it's refreshing to see a plotline driven by activity vs. apathy, the idea of these two ever-affable, best-friend characters suddenly discovering their potential, out-of-nowhere love for each other quickly feels both force-fed and emotionally-incorrect." Similarly, DVD Verdict stated that George and Izzie had "one of the strongest 'best-friend' vibes on television" for the first three seasons, explaining "they were perfect as friends [while] George and Callie made a good couple." UGO.com included George and Izzie in their list of "Character Couples Who Should Have Never Happened".

Entertainment Weekly's Jennifer Armstrong said that O'Malley's confession to Torres about his affair with Stevens felt overly "melodramatic." Laura Burrows, also from IGN, noted that the fourth season premiere "introduced a new side of George." Armstrong commented that the "sparkling" development of O'Malley's friendship with Lexie Grey "won her over". However, Monfette noted the character's decreased screen-time in season 5, stating: "His growing interest in trauma surgery at the side of Owen leads to an interesting development in the finale, but the character is virtually sidelined this season." Reflecting on O'Malley's death, Carina MacKenzie of the Los Angeles Times said: "The time-lapse episode was an interesting choice, and though we sped through six weeks of mourning in two hours, it didn't feel rushed to me. I'm not sure the show could have held my attention for another season of crippling sadness."

Michael Pascua of HuffPost commented that O'Malley's funeral did not meet his expectations, writing that it "wasn't as sad as [he] thought it would be".

== Awards ==
In 2006, Knight was part of the Grey's Anatomy ensemble that won the Satellite Award for Best Ensemble in a Television Series. His performance in Season 3 earned him a nomination for the Primetime Emmy Award for Outstanding Supporting Actor in a Drama Series at the 2007 ceremony. Additionally, he was also part of the ensemble cast nominated for the Screen Actors Guild Award for Outstanding Performance by an Ensemble in a Drama Series from 2006 to 2008, with a victory in 2007.
