= Miranda Bailey =

Fictional character

- Grey's Anatomy, Private Practice, and Station 19 character
- The season nine promotional photograph of Chandra Wilson as Dr. Miranda Bailey
- First appearance: Grey's Anatomy: "A Hard Day's Night" (1.01); March 27, 2005; Private Practice: "Ex-Life" (2.16); February 12, 2009; Station 19: "Stuck" (1.01); March 22, 2018; October 15, 2009
- Created by: Shonda Rhimes
- Portrayed by: Chandra Wilson

In-universe information
- Nicknames: The Nazi; Dr. B Mandy; BCB (Booty Call Bailey)
- Title(s): Attending General Surgeon; Director of the Residency Program; M.D. F.A.C.S.
- Occupation: Director of the Residency Program at Grey Sloan Memorial Hospital; Head of the Elena Bailey Memorial Clinic for Reproductive Health; Co-Founder of the Elena Bailey Memorial Clinic for Reproductive Health; Grey Sloan Memorial Hospital • Chief of Surgery (Former) • Chief of General Surgery (de facto) (Former) • Attending General Surgeon • Chief Resident (Former) • Resident (Former)
- Family: William Bailey (father); Helena Bailey (mother, deceased); Danielle Bailey (sister, deceased)
- Spouses: Tucker Jones (m. 1995; div. 2009) Ben Warren (m. 2012)
- Significant other: Eli Lloyd (former)
- Children: William George "Tuck" Bailey Jones; Joey Phillips (foster son); Pruitt Arike Miller (adopted daughter with Ben); Miscarriage (with Ben)
- Religion: Christianity
- Born: 1969
- Alma mater: Wellesley College (BS)

Miranda Bailey, M.D., F.A.C.S., is a fictional character from the long-running medical drama Grey's Anatomy, created by Shonda Rhimes and portrayed by Chandra Wilson since the series' debut in 2005. Bailey has appeared in 387 episodes across Grey's Anatomy (372 episodes), Private Practice (2 episodes), and Station 19 (13 episodes) as of October 2021. This makes her the most frequently appearing character in the Grey's Anatomy universe.

Originally introduced as a resident in general surgery at Seattle Grace Hospital, Bailey rises through the ranks to become an attending physician and is eventually appointed Chief of Surgery. Her relationship with the series' five original surgical interns—Meredith Grey (Ellen Pompeo), Cristina Yang (Sandra Oh), Izzie Stevens (Katherine Heigl), Alex Karev (Justin Chambers) and George O'Malley (T. R. Knight)—is a central focus in the early seasons, highlighting her role as a tough but caring mentor.

== Storyline ==
Miranda Bailey married Tucker Jones (Cress Williams) ten years prior to the start of Grey's Anatomy. A graduate of Wellesley College, Bailey is first introduced to the series’ interns with the nickname "The Nazi" due to her tough, no-nonsense personality and blunt approach. In the show's first season, Bailey’s formidable reputation is highlighted by her strong opinions and her tendency to challenge the authority of the attendings she worked under as a resident. Her straightforward introduction to her interns—“Don’t bother sucking up cause I already hate you and that’s not going to change”—is a reflection of her strict mentorship style.

Despite her stern demeanor and dictator-like personality, Bailey is also shown to be protective and caring toward her interns and colleagues. She warns Derek Shepherd to stay away from Meredith Grey, demonstrates loyalty by staying with Cristina Yang after her surgery, and exhibits compassion in many of her interactions. Over time, more of her personal life is revealed, including her decade-long marriage to Tucker and her pregnancy. In a dramatic moment during a bomb scare at Seattle Grace, Bailey gives birth to her son, William George Bailey Jones (nicknamed “Tuck”), with George O'Malley assisting her through labor.

Balancing motherhood and her career as a surgeon proves challenging for Bailey. Her professional confidence is shaken after incidents involving her interns, such as Izzie Stevens cutting Denny Duquette's LVAD wire and Cristina Yang hiding Burke's hand tremor. Bailey feels responsible for these actions, questioning her role as their mentor. Chief Webber consoles her, reminding her of the influence she has had: “You raised them like babies, and some of them turn out just like you.”

In an effort to make a broader impact, Bailey advocates for the creation of a free clinic at Seattle Grace, which is later funded by Izzie’s inheritance from Denny. Despite her many achievements, Bailey experiences a setback when she loses the position of Chief Resident to Callie Torres, which further challenges her sense of control and authority within the hospital.

In season 4, Bailey decides to support Torres in her role as Chief Resident, which Chief Webber takes notice of. Realizing that he made a mistake by not selecting Bailey for the position, he admits his error. Struggling to balance her responsibilities as Chief Resident and overseeing the free clinic, Bailey ultimately assigns Izzie to manage the clinic, giving herself more time to focus on both her family and her career. Bailey also begins to question her satisfaction with General Surgery, feeling somewhat unfulfilled. After working closely with Arizona Robbins, a pediatric surgeon, and handling several pediatric cases, Bailey becomes interested in pursuing a career in Pediatric Surgery. Robbins encourages Bailey to apply for a pediatric fellowship, but Chief Webber, who had mentored Bailey in general surgery, is displeased with her choice and discourages her at every turn. His attempts to dissuade her include providing an underwhelming recommendation letter and purchasing a surgical robot to tempt her back to general surgery.

Despite Webber’s resistance, Bailey remains committed to her new path—until her husband, Tucker Jones, threatens her with divorce if she accepts the fellowship. Facing the ultimatum, Bailey decides to stay in general surgery to balance her role as a single mother and an attending surgeon. She ends her marriage to Tucker, prioritizing her career and autonomy over his demands. During Izzie’s battle with cancer, which has a low 5% survival rate, Bailey is a source of unwavering support for Izzie, helping her through chemotherapy and cancer treatments.

In season 6, after declining the pediatric fellowship, Bailey begins her role as an Attending in General Surgery. She enters into a relationship with Ben Warren (Jason George), an anesthesiologist from Mercy West, after the merger between Seattle Grace and Mercy West hospitals. In the season finale, a gunman, enraged by what he believes to be the hospital's failure to save his wife, opens fire on the hospital staff. Dr. Charles Percy, one of the victims, is critically wounded, but due to the hospital lockdown, Bailey is unable to get him to an operating room. As Percy dies in her arms, he tells Bailey, "You were always my favorite. I thought you should know."

Distraught by these traumatic events, Bailey takes time off to visit her parents with her son, Tuck, to recover emotionally. Upon her return in season 7, Bailey breaks up with Ben, citing the emotional toll of recent events. She reconnects with Mary Portman, a patient she had bonded with during the hospital shooting, who returns for her surgery. While the procedure appears successful, Mary tragically does not wake up, and the cause of her death remains unknown. Shaken, Bailey embarks on a new mission to cure fistulas, during which she begins dating Eli (Daniel Sunjata), a nurse at the hospital.

Bailey later becomes deeply offended when Meredith violates the rules of an Alzheimer's clinical trial to assist Chief Webber’s wife, Adele, leading to Webber's resignation as Chief of Surgery. Bailey resents Meredith for forcing Webber out of his position and takes control of Ellis Grey's diabetes trial, though Webber encourages her to forgive Meredith and involve her in the project. Ultimately, Bailey breaks off her relationship with Eli, realizing it has no future, and rekindles her romance with Ben, despite his surgical internship in California.

Their long-distance relationship flourishes, and they become engaged. During this time, Bailey earns the nickname BCB ("Booty Call Bailey") from the interns, as she becomes giddy and excited whenever Ben visits. On the day of her wedding, Bailey is called into surgery to save Adele and, after successfully operating, rushes back to marry Ben. Bailey also spearheads the launch of a genome mapping program with Meredith being the first to test it.

In season 9, Bailey faces an investigation when three of her patients die after contracting infections. It is eventually discovered that she was an asymptomatic carrier of MRSA, which she unknowingly transmitted due to the hospital's use of faulty gloves. Though cleared of any wrongdoing, Bailey feels "contaminated" and isolates herself from colleagues, particularly Dr. Webber, whom she blames for not supporting her during the investigation.

Her husband, Ben, flies in to help her move past this, revealing that he has dropped out of his residency to spend more time with her and Tuck, a decision Bailey disapproves of. As she begins to exhibit strange behaviors, Bailey is diagnosed with obsessive–compulsive disorder (OCD), a result of the trauma she experienced during the investigation. Initially resistant to seeking treatment or taking medication, she eventually accepts help and is able to resume her surgical career.

In season 14, Bailey becomes deeply upset when her husband, Ben Warren, expresses an interest in becoming a firefighter. This follows the traumatic events of the season 13 finale, when a fire broke out at Grey Sloan Memorial Hospital after Dr. Stephanie Edwards set it to defend herself from a rapist. Later that season, Bailey is hospitalized after suffering a heart attack.

In season 16, Bailey faces another significant challenge when she fires Meredith for committing insurance fraud to save a patient. Shortly after, Maggie Pierce informs Bailey that she is pregnant with her second child while also entering perimenopause. Tragically, in the fall finale, Bailey suffers a miscarriage, and later that season, she also fosters a teenage boy, Joey Phillips.

In season 17, as Grey Sloan Memorial treats patients during the COVID-19 pandemic, Bailey feels an immense sense of guilt for recently moving her parents into a local nursing home. Her guilt intensifies when her mother is hospitalized with the virus. In an emotionally poignant moment, Bailey sings to her mother as she succumbs to the disease. Despite the profound loss, Bailey chooses to return to work shortly after, resisting attempts by Webber and Jackson Avery to convince her to take time off to grieve.

== Development ==
=== Casting and creation ===
Shonda Rhimes initially wrote the character of Miranda Bailey as a petite, blonde-haired white woman with curls, envisioning the contrast between her sweet appearance and her tough, no-nonsense attitude. However, after Chandra Wilson's outstanding audition, the role was rewritten for her. Wilson was cast as Bailey, transforming the character into a fierce yet compassionate figure. Sandra Oh originally considered auditioning for Bailey before landing the role of Cristina Yang instead. Reflecting on her portrayal of Bailey, Wilson noted, "I thought it was endearing; endearing as the word 'Nazi' can be," referencing Bailey's authoritative and demanding demeanor in the show's early seasons. Wilson further explained her approach to the character:

It's a teacher's mentality. The pilot described me as the Nazi, so I had to think about that and try to relate. It's about my demeanor, how I carry myself, demanding respect from my students. Once I have that, I just teach.

=== Characterization ===
Bailey has been consistently described as "straightforward", "tough", and "quick-witted" by Grey's Anatomy executives. Wilson herself has reflected on the complexity of her character, saying:

"I think a strength and a weakness for her is her ego. The strength part is great because it really does make her a really good physician. She's really good at her job and she continues to evolve and she continues to look at ways to be 'value added' at the hospital and is incredibly independent. That independence has certainly gotten in the way of her personal relationships. It's gotten in the way of her being a team player on many occasions."

This aspect of Bailey's character has been central to her development throughout the series, as she navigates her personal and professional challenges while maintaining her leadership in the hospital.

== Reception ==
In 2006, USA Today TV critic Robert Bianco praised Chandra Wilson, suggesting that Emmy voters should consider her performance as Dr. Miranda Bailey, stating she adds "warmth and humor to Bailey without making her go all squishy.". Reviewing the fourth season of Grey's Anatomy, Patrick Luce from Monsters and Critics found Bailey to be "one of the most interesting characters to watch", noting how she handled professional setbacks, marriage troubles, and the stress of balancing motherhood with her medical career. He also appreciated the depiction of a "softer side" of Bailey, while maintaining the "biting satire and sarcasm" that defined her character.

Shawna Malcom of the Los Angeles Times highlighted the dynamic between Bailey and Sam during the Grey's Anatomy and Private Practice crossover, particularly enjoying their humor and chemistry, calling it "hilarious and touching". She hoped it wouldn’t be the last viewers saw of the "unexpectedly dynamic duo". Fellow Los Angeles Times critic Carina MacKenzie welcomed Bailey's flirtation with Ben Warren, calling it refreshing to see Bailey’s "fun, flirty side" after her troubled relationship with Tucker. Margaret Lyons of New York Magazine praised the evolving friendship between Bailey and Callie Torres, calling it "the one bright spot" of the ninth season. She appreciated how they "joke, tease each other, and offer sage love advice", now that both were on their second marriages. Entertainment Weekly included Bailey in its list of the "30 Great TV Doctors and Nurses", while AOL TV named her one of the "100 Most Memorable Female TV Characters".

== Awards ==
Chandra Wilson’s portrayal of Dr. Miranda Bailey has garnered high critical acclaim and multiple award nominations. In 2006, she won the Screen Actors Guild Award for Outstanding Performance by a Female Actor in a Drama Series and was part of the ensemble cast that won the Satellite Award for Best Cast – Television Series. She also received four consecutive nominations for the Primetime Emmy Award for Outstanding Supporting Actress in a Drama Series from 2006 to 2009, losing to co-star Katherine Heigl in 2007. Additionally, Wilson was part of the ensemble cast nominated for the Screen Actors Guild Award for Outstanding Performance by an Ensemble in a Drama Series from 2006 to 2008, with a victory in 2007. In 2008, she won the People's Choice Award for Favorite Scene Stealing Star.
