= Flight (Grey's Anatomy) =

- Grey's Anatomy episode
- Shepherd's mangled hand, following an aviation accident.
- Episode no.: Season 8 Episode 24
- Directed by: Rob Corn
- Written by: Shonda Rhimes
- Original air date: May 17, 2012
- Running time: 43 minutes

Guest appearances
- Jason George as Dr. Ben Warren; James LeGros as Jerry

Episode chronology
← Previous "Migration"	Next → "Going, Going, Gone"
- Grey's Anatomy season 8

"Flight" is the twenty-fourth episode and the season finale of the eighth season of the American television medical drama Grey's Anatomy, and the show's 172nd episode overall. It was written by series creator Shonda Rhimes, and directed by Rob Corn. The episode was originally broadcast on the American Broadcasting Company (ABC) in the United States on May 17, 2012.

In this episode, 6 doctors from Seattle Grace Mercy West Hospital become victims of an aviation accident and fight to survive, but Lexie Grey (Chyler Leigh) tragically dies. Other storylines take place in Seattle, where Richard Webber (James Pickens, Jr.) prepares for his annual dinner for the departing residents, Owen Hunt (Kevin McKidd) fires Teddy Altman (Kim Raver), and Miranda Bailey (Chandra Wilson) gets engaged to Ben Warren (Jason George).

The episode marked the final regular appearance of Leigh, though she would return as a guest star in season 17. The exterior scenes of the plane crash were filmed at Big Bear Lake, California. George reprised his role as a guest star, while James LeGros made his first appearance in the series.

Upon its initial airing, the episode was viewed in the United States by 11.44 million people, received a 4.1/11 Nielsen rating/share in the 18–49 demographic, ranking #4 for the night in terms of viewership, and registering as Thursday's highest-rated drama

"Flight" received widespread critical acclaim from television critics and audiences alike, with high praise directed towards the performances of Leigh, Ellen Pompeo (Meredith Grey), and Eric Dane (Mark Sloan). "Flight" earned Rhimes a nomination for the NAACP Image Award for Outstanding Writing in a Dramatic Series and also received several nominations at Entertainment Weekly's finale awards.

== Plot ==
The episode opens with a voice-over narration from Richard Webber (James Pickens, Jr.) and Meredith Grey (Ellen Pompeo) about the challenges of residency and how success is determined by individual perseverance.

After their plane crashes in the woods, Meredith Grey (Ellen Pompeo), Derek Shepherd (Patrick Dempsey), Cristina Yang (Sandra Oh), Mark Sloan (Eric Dane), Lexie Grey (Chyler Leigh) and Arizona Robbins (Jessica Capshaw) are left desperately fighting to stay alive. Meredith suffers only minor injuries, but the rest of the group faces severe trauma: the pilot, Jerry (James LeGros), has a critical spine injury, Cristina dislocates her arm, Robbins has a life-threatening open femur fracture, and Sloan, despite appearing mobile due to adrenaline, has grave internal injuries. Shepherd is flung out of the side of the plane, awakening alone in the forest with a mangled hand caused by the crash.

Among the group, none are in worse shape than Lexie, who is trapped under a large piece of the plane. As Meredith searches for Derek, Cristina and Sloan attempt to free Lexie, but they soon realize they are unable to save her. In her final moments, Sloan holds her hand, professing his love and recounting the future they were meant to have together. Lexie dies with a smile on her face, just as Meredith and Cristina approach, leaving the group devastated by the loss.

Meredith is especially shattered but remains focused on finding Derek. Eventually, she reunites with him, and together with Cristina, they do their best to stabilize his hand. Meanwhile, back at Seattle Grace Mercy West Hospital, the staff is unaware of the plane crash. Webber prepares for the annual dinner for the departing residents, including Alex Karev (Justin Chambers), April Kepner (Sarah Drew) and Jackson Avery (Jesse Williams), who are anxious about their futures. Avery decides to accept a position at Tulane Medical Center, sharing a tender moment with Kepner.

Elsewhere, Miranda Bailey (Chandra Wilson) and Ben Warren (Jason George) decide to get married despite Warren starting his surgical internship in Los Angeles. Owen Hunt (Kevin McKidd), the hospital's chief of surgery, makes the difficult decision to fire Teddy Altman (Kim Raver), allowing her to take the chief position at United States Army Medical Command without the guilt of leaving the hospital where her husband died.

As the episode comes to a close, Hunt discovers the plane carrying the doctors never arrived in Boise, Idaho. The residents, previously anxious about Webber's dinner, now wait in uncertainty for news of their colleagues. Meanwhile, in the wilderness, the surviving doctors are struggling to stay conscious, with their last match burning out. Meredith closes the episode by reciting the opening lines of Webber's speech from the pilot episode, echoing the series' beginning.

== Production ==
"It was so hard. It was physically and emotionally challenging because you're constantly at extremely high stakes. The physicality for Cristina, she had to do a lot of things with one arm, and I had to do a lot of things with one shoe. You're running around the mountain with one shoe and one arm basically and doing things that way. And it's like we've had this cushy time on stages and in the hospital. But being out in the open on the side of a mountain was exhilarating; you cannot beat location work. I've done very little greenscreen work, but it's just a pooper. I don't care how much you blow that fan on my face, there's not a helicopter coming at me. It's really hard to manufacture the clear reality of what that is, but when you are on a mountain and you are freezing, you're freezing."

— Oh's impressions on shooting in the mountains

The episode was written by Shonda Rhimes and directed by Rob Corn. Featured music included The Paper Kites' "Featherstone" and Feist's "Graveyard". Filming took place in Big Bear Lake, California, a location previously used in Season 7 for Cristina Yang (Sandra Oh) and Derek Shepherd's (Patrick Dempsey) fishing trip. Commenting on the challenging filming conditions, Chyler Leigh (Lexie Grey) shared: "It would rain and be sunny and hot. I never died before [on camera]. That sounds funny saying that. I think everyone has an emotional wellspring, and that happened to be a moment where I was sprung. Everybody was very accommodating — the crew, the cast. And I opted to stay underneath [the wreckage] for the most part over 2 days rather than trying to get in and out."

Regarding the episode, Rhimes remarked that it was particularly difficult to write due to the death of a main character. She compared the experience to writing the Season 6 finale, explaining that the former was "more painful" to write. After the episode aired, Rhimes reiterated in a tweet that the finale had been hard to write, adding: "I did not enjoy it. It made me sick, and it made me sad." In discussing Leigh's departure, whose character Lexie Grey died following the plane crash, Rhimes revealed that the decision came after extensive discussions between the two. Speaking on Kim Raver's departure, whose character Teddy Altman left Seattle Grace for MEDCOM, Rhimes explained that Raver was offered a contract renewal but ultimately declined.

== Release ==
"Flight" was originally broadcast on May 17, 2012, in the United States on the American Broadcasting Company (ABC), and it outperformed the previous episode in terms of both viewership and ratings. The episode was watched by a total of 11.44 million viewers in the U.S., a 16.5% increase (1.62 million more viewers) from the previous episode "Migration", which garnered 9.82 million viewers. In terms of overall viewership for the night, "Flight" ranked fourth, behind the season finales of Fox's American Idol, and CBS's Person of Interest and The Mentalist.

Compared to Grey's Anatomy's other season finales, "Flight" was the show's second least-viewed finale, just ahead of the Season 7's finale, "Unaccompanied Minor", which attracted 9.89 million viewers. While it did not make the top 3 for overall viewership, its 4.1/11 Nielsen rating ranked #1 in its 9:00 PM time slot and #2 for the night, registering as Thursday's #1 drama in both rating and share percentages in the 18–49 demographic. The episode's rating was second only to American Idol but managed to surpass shows like CBS's The Big Bang Theory, Person of Interest, and The Mentalist.

This was an improvement from the previous episode, "Migration", which garnered a 3.5/10 rating/share in the 18–49 demographic. Additionally, the episode saw a notable increase in ratings compared to the previous season's finale, "Unaccompanied Minor", which had a 3.6/9 rating/share in the same demographic.

== Reception ==
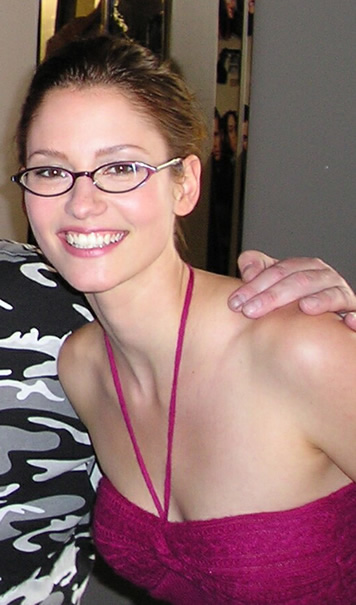
Chyler Leigh's final performance as Lexie Grey was deemed "phenomenal" by several critics.

"Flight" received widespread critical acclaim from television critics and audiences alike, with high praise directed towards the performances of Chyler Leigh (Lexie Grey), Ellen Pompeo (Meredith Grey) and Eric Dane (Mark Sloan).

Poptimal's Tanya Lane described it as shocking, writing, "Wow...just wow. Grey's Anatomy has once again managed to shock with its season finale." While she appreciated the show's realism and authenticity, Lane found the episode "almost too much" due to its gory visuals and the emotional weight of the storyline, particularly praising Ellen Pompeo's performance during Meredith's reaction to Lexie's death. Digital Spy's Ben Lee commended Leigh and Dane's performances, calling them "phenomenal" and adding that Dane had perhaps delivered his best work in the episode. He noted that Lexie's death felt like a finale in itself and found Teddy Altman's departure the most significant moment at Seattle Grace. Entertainment Weekly's Tanner Stransky remarked on Lexie's death, calling it "an intense death" and acknowledging the necessity of shaking up the show, though he questioned the decision to kill Lexie. Stransky also criticized Arizona Robbins' (Jessica Capshaw) screams but found Miranda Bailey's (Chandra Wilson) storyline compelling.

In an Entertainment Weekly poll that judged all the television season finales of the year, Lexie's death was voted the "Top Tissue Moment", while Robbins' injured leg and Shepherd's mangled hand were voted the "Most Disturbing Image". The ending of the episode was also considered as the "Best Ending to an Otherwise So-So Season". Lexie's death was also nominated under the "Best (Presumed) Death" category, while the plane crash's aftermath was nominated as the "Best Non-Romantic Cliffhanger", and the episode was nominated for the special award for "Biggest Regret That I Didn't See It, I Just Heard or Read About It". Entertainment Weekly later named the scene where Meredith is crying one of the best crying scenes of 2012. In TVLine's review of 2012, Lexie's death was the runner-up for "Biggest Tearjerker". The episode earned Rhimes a nomination for the NAACP Image Award for Outstanding Writing in a Dramatic Series.
