= Flowers Grow Out of My Grave =

- Grey's Anatomy episode
- Episode no.: Season 15; Episode 6
- Directed by: Nicole Rubio
- Written by: Kiley Donovan
- Original air date: November 1, 2018
- Running time: 43 minutes

Guest appearances
- Chris Carmack as Dr. Atticus Lincoln; Tracie Thoms as Roberta Gibbs; Jessica Collins as Denise; Stacey Oristano as Frankie Shavelson; Jake Borelli as Dr. Levi Schmitt; Terri Hoyos as Flor's Abuela; Miriam A. Hyman as Michelle Williams; Carl Beukes as Daniel; Kate Burton as Ellis Grey; Uncredited Archive Footage: T.R. Knight as George O'Malley; Chyler Leigh as Lexie Grey; Patrick Dempsey as Derek Shepherd; Eric Dane as Mark Sloan

Episode chronology
← Previous "Everyday Angel"	Next → "Anybody Have a Map?"
- Grey's Anatomy (season 15)

"Flowers Grow Out of My Grave" is the sixth episode of the fifteenth season of the American medical drama television series Grey's Anatomy, and the 323rd overall episode, which aired on American Broadcasting Company (ABC) on November 1, 2018. The episode was written by Kiley Donovan and directed by Nicole Rubio, and shows the celebration of the Day of the Dead at Grey Sloan Memorial Hospital, featuring deceased characters from previous seasons such as George O'Malley, Lexie Grey, Ellis Grey, Doc the dog, Derek Shepherd and Mark Sloan. The episode received positive reviews, with praise for its concept and for the montage of the deceased characters towards the end.

== Plot ==
Meredith treats a patient whose family celebrates Day of the Dead, making her think about the loved ones she has lost herself. Richard delivers the news that her father Thatcher is dying of acute myeloid leukemia. As they haven't talked since Lexie's death, Meredith is unsure whether to reach out to him or not. After working a case together, Nico and Levi share their first kiss but Nico turns him down after learning that he does not have any experience with men. Jackson tries to make up with Maggie while Jo encourages Link to pursue Meredith, who continues going on blind dates. While Link's treating a kid with cancer shows Meredith that he has more depth than she thought, Andrew is also showing interest in her. Meanwhile, Teddy tries to tell Owen about her pregnancy but they get sidetracked when Betty disappears. In search for a liver for their patient who has prepared herself to die, Bailey and Jo bring a liver back from the dead.

== Production ==
The episode was written by Kiley Donovan and directed by Nicole Rubio. The characters of George O'Malley (portrayed by T. R. Knight), Lexie Grey (Chyler Leigh), Derek Shepherd (Patrick Dempsey) and Mark Sloan (Eric Dane) appear through manipulated archive footage. Ellis Grey (played by Kate Burton) made a guest appearance.

== Reception ==
=== Rating ===
"Flowers Grow Out of My Grave" was originally broadcast on November 1, 2018 in the United States on the American Broadcasting Company (ABC). The episode was watched by a total of 6.71 million viewers, rising up from the previous episode's 6.54. In the key 18-49 demographic, the episode scored a 1.6/7 rating/share, down one tenth from the previous episode. The episode ranked 14th in the Top 25 primetime broadcast shows of the week in adults 18-49 rating, and became the second most viewed drama series of the week after This Is Us.

=== Reviews ===
Entertainment Weekly wrote about the episode, stating "It’s not about celebrating death. It’s about celebrating the dead. The holiday is all about coming together to remember the ones who have passed away. And for our Grey’s Anatomy cast, that list is pretty long."
