= What Is It About Men =

What Is It About Men may refer to:

- "What Is It About Men" (song), a 2003 song by Amy Winehouse off the album Frank
- "What Is It About Men" (Grey's Anatomy), a 2011 season 8 TV episode of Grey's Anatomy
