= Grey's Anatomy season 17 =

Grey's Anatomy
- Season 17
- Promotional poster for the seventeenth season of Grey's Anatomy
- Showrunners: Krista Vernoff; Shonda Rhimes
- Starring: Ellen Pompeo; Chandra Wilson; James Pickens Jr.; Kevin McKidd; Jesse Williams; Caterina Scorsone; Camilla Luddington; Kelly McCreary; Giacomo Gianniotti; Kim Raver; Greg Germann; Jake Borelli; Chris Carmack; Richard Flood; Anthony Hill
- No. of episodes: 17

Release
- Original network: ABC
- Original release: November 12, 2020 – June 3, 2021

Season chronology
- ← Previous; Season 16 Next → Season 18

The seventeenth season of the American medical drama television series Grey's Anatomy was ordered in May 2019, by the American Broadcasting Company (ABC), as part of a double renewal with the sixteenth season. Shortly after, Krista Vernoff signed an agreement to continue serving as the showrunner of the series. Filming on the series began in September 2020 while the season did not premiere until November 12, 2020, both dates being delayed as a result of the COVID-19 pandemic, for the 2020–2021 broadcast television season. The impact of the COVID-19 pandemic on television only allowed seventeen episodes to be produced, the fewest of any season since the fourth season. Numerous safety protocols were also implemented across various areas of production to prevent COVID-19 transmission.

All starring cast members from the previous season returned with the exception of Justin Chambers, who departed early in the sixteenth season. In addition, Richard Flood and Anthony Hill, who both appeared in the sixteenth season in recurring and guest capacities, respectively, received promotions to the main cast. This season also marked the return of former series regulars Patrick Dempsey, T. R. Knight, Chyler Leigh, and Eric Dane to the series. Meanwhile, main cast members Giacomo Gianniotti, Jesse Williams, and Greg Germann all departed the series during the season. Former series regular Sarah Drew also appeared in the season as part of Williams' departure.

Grey's Anatomy centers around the professional and personal lives of a group of medical professionals that work at the fictional Grey Sloan Memorial Hospital. Nearly every main storyline in the season centered around the COVID-19 pandemic, with a number of plot points also connecting to spin-off series Station 19 through fictional crossover events. The season primarily received mixed reviews from critics and remained ABC's most-watched scripted series, even though viewing figures dropped significantly from the previous season. The season eventually concluded on June 3, 2021. Despite initial uncertainty from the cast, crew, and the network, the series was eventually renewed for an eighteenth season.

== Episodes ==
The number in the "No. overall" column refers to the episode's number within the overall series, whereas the number in the "No. in season" column refers to the episode's number within this particular season. "U.S. viewers in millions" refers to the number of Americans in millions who watched the episodes live. Each episode of this season is named after a song.

Grey's Anatomy season 17 episodes
No. overall	No. in season	Title	Directed by	Written by	Original release date	U.S. viewers (millions)
364	1	"All Tomorrow's Parties"	Debbie Allen	Andy Reaser & Lynne E. Litt	November 12, 2020	5.93
365	2	"The Center Won't Hold"	Debbie Allen	Andy Reaser & Jase Miles-Perez	November 12, 2020	5.93
In the midst of the COVID-19 pandemic, the doctors at Grey Sloan Memorial Hospital struggle as they work to save lives. Meredith Grey, who leads the front-line workers, becomes increasingly frustrated as her patients continue to die from the virus. Fully recovered, Richard Webber returns to work and is greeted by Miranda Bailey, who shows him the new safety protocols. Following an intervention from his co-workers, Andrew DeLuca undergoes therapy for his mental health and begins to work as an attending for the hospital. Two different fathers who both have children in the hospital get into a fight, while Andrew's child-trafficking patient returns in bad condition. Jo Wilson and Jackson Avery fumble around each other at work due to a failed sexual encounter, while the relationship between Maggie Pierce and Winston Ndugu deepens. After Owen Hunt gives Teddy Altman a chance to tell him the truth about her affair with Tom Koracick, he plays her the voicemail and ends their relationship. Amelia Shepherd and Atticus "Link" Lincoln adjust to parenting their newborn son. Schmitt and Nico Kim have a sexual encounter after Schmitt refuses to talk to Nico. After Meredith faints in the parking lot at the end of her shift, she has a vision of herself on a beach, where she sees Derek Shepherd. These episodes conclude a crossover event that begins on Station 19 season 4 episode 1.
366	3	"My Happy Ending"	Kevin McKidd	Meg Marinis	November 19, 2020	5.96
Meredith is admitted to the hospital with a positive COVID-19 diagnosis; as her respiratory system continues to deteriorate, she flashes in and out of her vision on the beach, where she talks to Derek. Tom is assigned to train a new set of interns, but when he neglects his duty to do so, Richard takes over. Teddy works on Meredith's case, though Maggie is afraid Teddy's personal issues will distract her from performing her job well; Teddy later tries to apologize to Koracick, who finds out that he is also COVID positive. Jo treats a pregnant woman whose baby is attached to her liver, while Jackson and Link perform surgery on a sex therapist. After Bailey asks Meredith to update her advanced healthcare directive, Meredith looks to Richard for help. Amelia and Maggie both struggle with Meredith's failing health and turn to their respective boyfriends for support.
367	4	"You'll Never Walk Alone"	Allison Liddi-Brown	Julie Wong	December 3, 2020	5.84
As Meredith's condition worsens, leaving her asleep most of the day, she finds herself on the beach with George O'Malley. They reflect on their lives, his death, and how George changed Meredith's life. Meanwhile, per Andrew's suggestion, Richard contemplates including Meredith in an antibody trial run by a doctor in Manhattan. After a talk with Bailey, he consents. Tom is forced to remain quarantined at home when another test comes back positive; while initially asymptomatic, he develops a serious fever by the end of the day and hides from Teddy when she comes to offer him socially-distanced company. Amelia and Link clash over their vastly different ways of dealing with sadness and uncertainty. When an Asian-American patient Owen treated earlier is admitted with a worsened condition, Nico and Bailey make Owen address the racial bias in the practice of medicine. Meanwhile, Jo and Jackson give their friendship another chance, which leads to them becoming friends with benefits, and Maggie finds herself in an awkward situation when Winston's frustrations with his father surface during an online family dinner.
368	5	"Fight the Power"	Michael Watkins	Zoanne Clack	December 10, 2020	5.69
When an assisted living home is hit with a COVID surge, Bailey's mother, who also suffers from Alzheimer's disease, is rushed to the hospital with an advanced case of COVID. Bailey learns that her mother is not expected to survive and, after seeking out comfort from Maggie and a bed-ridden Meredith, Bailey prepares to say goodbye. Koracick is also admitted to Grey Sloan with COVID, and with his condition rapidly deteriorating, Amelia steps in to operate on him while a worried Teddy stands idly by. Meanwhile, Jo considers a change in specialties after she is recruited to deliver a baby, and Jackson and Richard ponder over how the pandemic has affected minorities differently.
369	6	"No Time for Despair"	Pete Chatmon	Felicia Pride	December 17, 2020	5.66
Meredith awakes as her condition improves and bonds with Koracick, but when a nearby patient is coding and she gets up to perform CPR, she passes out. Richard activates surge protocol at the hospital and turns the cafeteria into a COVID-19 treatment room. Andrew helps Bailey get through her mother's death. He later sees the kidnapper of the girl he saved leaving the hospital and convinces Carina DeLuca to follow her. Teddy shares with Owen the story of her friend Allison, and lashes out at Taryn Helm as the escalation of the COVID-19 pandemic continues. At the end, Winston shows up at Maggie's hotel room door as Meredith's condition worsens and she is placed on a ventilator, waking up on the beach again. Note: This episode concludes a crossover event that begins on Station 19 season 4 episode 5.
370	7	"Helplessly Hoping"	Nicole Rubio	Elisabeth R. Finch	March 11, 2021	5.11
The Grey Sloan Memorial staff desperately try to save Andrew after he is stabbed while trying to confront Opal, the child trafficker from the previous season. Though Andrew is initially in the clear, he later crashes again and dies in surgery. Jo and Cormac Hayes argue over allowing a patient to see her premature baby, and Levi Schmitt vents to Nico about his guilt over unknowingly treating Opal. Winston and Maggie's romantic getaway gets interrupted by Jackson, while Amelia and Link discuss whether they should tell Zola about Meredith's deteriorating health. Richard tries to get back into surgery, and Teddy and Owen butt heads outside of the operating room. Note: This episode concludes a crossover event that begins on Station 19 season 4 episode 6.
371	8	"It's All Too Much"	Debbie Allen	Adrian Wenner	March 18, 2021	4.97
The hospital staff struggles to come to terms with the death of Andrew, with Teddy taking the hardest hit as she sees visions of him around the hospital. At a memorial for Andrew, while each doctor pays tribute to him in a farewell video, Owen finds Teddy mentally unresponsive and takes her home. Bailey desperately tries to find a way that Andrew could have been saved, despite the team doing everything they possibly could. After Richard recognizes Bailey's behavior as her coping mechanism for her own mother's death, Bailey decides to take time off to rest and grieve properly. Maggie and Winston treat a patient with haphephobia, while Link turns to alcohol to deal with the stress of caring for his son and Meredith's children. Meanwhile, Meredith remains on the ventilator even after Teddy attempts to take her off. Meredith sees Derek on the beach and wants to stay with him, but Hayes urges her to fight and return to the real world.
372	9	"In My Life"	Kevin McKidd	Tameson Duffy	March 25, 2021	4.99
Unable to deal with the death of Andrew DeLuca, Teddy falls into a catatonic state and is cared for by Owen. While Amelia comes over to convince Owen to forgive Teddy for her infidelity and get her some psychiatric help, Teddy remains trapped in her dreams, where she is haunted by Deluca and Meredith. Still not completely over the death of her former lover, Allison, Teddy must confront what Amelia suspects is lingering post-traumatic stress disorder.
373	10	"Breathe"	Linda Klein	Mark Driscoll	April 1, 2021	4.55
With the hospital running out of ventilators, Owen, having taken over Meredith's case from Teddy, is hesitant to try to take Meredith off her ventilator. Maggie and Jackson are forced to make a tough call about the last available ventilator when both a mother and her daughter rapidly decline. They decide to use the ventilator for the girl just as Levi intubates the mother, a family friend of his, to get her hooked up to the ventilator, forcing him to manually ventilate her as they await a solution. Inspired by Winston, Maggie devises a way to let patients share a ventilator. Elsewhere, Jo and Catherine team up when Cormac's sister-in-law, who lives with multiple sclerosis, is admitted with a kidney stone. Amelia and Teddy spend the day together with the kids as Owen doesn't trust Teddy to look after them by herself; however, after successfully taking Meredith off the ventilator, Owen gives Teddy credit for her work on the case. Meredith, meanwhile, spends the day on her beach with Mark Sloan and Lexie Grey, who convince her that life and all of its aspects are worth living, and Winston asks Maggie to marry him.
374	11	"Sorry Doesn't Always Make It Right"	Giacomo Gianniotti	Julie Wong	April 8, 2021	4.83
A newly married couple involved in a car crash on the day of their honeymoon gives the doctors of Grey Sloan a run for their money when the husband realizes he rushed into marriage too quickly. Hayes works with Maggie on an infant's defective heart and tries to convince her to perform a risky surgery. Jackson clashes with Mama Ortiz, who points out that Jackson booking hotels for COVID-positive patients with his own money is taking away affordable living spaces from low-income residents. Meredith finally wakes up and tells Richard that she overheard Jo considering switching specialties, while Bailey's conversation with a patient prompts Owen to forgive Teddy. Meanwhile, when Link's parents surprise him and Amelia by taking the kids on a road trip for the day, Amelia and Link use the empty house to discuss potentially getting married in light of Amelia's continuous struggle with sobriety. Note: This episode concludes a crossover event that begins on Station 19 season 4 episode 10.
375	12	"Sign O' the Times"	Michael Medico	Jase Miles-Perez	April 15, 2021	4.98
Amid the Seattle protests following the murder of George Floyd, Richard and Hayes go to protest. Hayes is attacked by a Neo-Nazi counter-protester at the protests and worries about the safety of his sons. Jackson questions his mother about free COVID testing, but she avoids his question. Bailey treats a man who, despite testing positive for COVID, refuses treatment because he believes the pandemic is a scam. Meanwhile, Maggie worries about Winston as he drives cross-country to live with her in Seattle following their engagement, and Schmitt accompanies Meredith (who is still mostly sleeping) to the hyperbaric chamber along with another doctor and his patient.
376	13	"Good as Hell"	Michael Watkins	Zoanne Clack	April 22, 2021	4.81
As Teddy, Richard, and Winston continue to search for more ideas to wake Meredith up, Derek tries to convince a very stubborn Meredith to leave the beach and return to her loved ones. Though Meredith is reluctant to say goodbye to Derek again, she finally wakes up when Zola visits her in the hospital in front of the rest of the doctors. Meanwhile, Link gets annoyed when Amelia intercepts his case and takes it for herself, and Jo tries to persuade Bailey to let her switch specialties. Owen breaks down after losing a patient, while Schmitt and Bailey treat a woman who has quit her corporate job in favor of a more free lifestyle. Teddy unsuccessfully tries to reconcile with Owen, and Nico asks Schmitt to move in with him, prompting a surprised Schmitt to walk away without an answer.
377	14	"Look Up Child"	Debbie Allen	Elisabeth R. Finch & Felicia Pride	May 6, 2021	4.93
In need of some advice, Jackson visits his estranged father, who sets him on a new path in his career. Following their conversation, Jackson proposes to April Kepner that they move to Boston with Harriet to run the Catherine Fox Foundation. Though April is initially hesitant, she eventually agrees, having split up from Matthew and ready for new beginnings.
378	15	"Tradition"	Kevin McKidd	Jess Righthand	May 20, 2021	4.58
Just ahead of his move to Boston, Jackson informs the staff of his impending departure and spends the day giving individual goodbyes. Meredith finally prepares to be discharged from the hospital, but Richard and Bailey first must figure out how to break the news about Andrew's passing. While Amelia scrambles to get the house ready before Meredith gets home, Link learns from Owen and Winston that he and Amelia might not be moving out as soon as Link thought. Koracick treats a Native American man, prompting him to realize the privilege he has; wanting to do more with his life, Koracick decides to go to Boston with Jackson. Jo embarks on her first day of OB/GYN with Carina, and Schmitt confronts Helm about her lackluster performance in surgery. Winston and Maggie ask Richard to officiate their wedding, and Teddy and Owen begin sleeping together again.
379	16	"I'm Still Standing"	Michael Watkins	Meg Marinis & Andy Reaser	May 27, 2021	4.33
Meredith begins her recovery process over the course of a month, and after she voices her concerns to Bailey about the possibility that she'll never be able to operate again, Bailey proposes that Meredith take over the residency program, which Meredith accepts. At the hospital, while Owen and Amelia treat a young car crash patient, Amelia confesses that Link wants more children but that she does not. Hayes and Jo continue to work on Luna, and though Jo hopes to adopt Luna, her application is denied due to an issue with Jo's background check. Maggie, Richard, and Helm try to diagnose a woman who is experiencing strange symptoms following her heart transplant, until they learn that the woman has been faking it because she wants to stay at the hospital. Meanwhile, Maggie and Winston argue over wedding plans, and Schmitt makes up with Nico following Schmitt's acceptance into the COVID-19 vaccine trial.
380	17	"Someone Saved My Life Tonight"	Kevin McKidd	Andy Reaser & Meg Marinis	June 3, 2021	4.76
Leading up to Maggie and Winston's wedding, the doctors of Grey Sloan recount the events of the last eight months, starting from August 2020. On Meredith's first day as Director of the Residency Program, she butts heads with Bailey; at the same time, Meredith also treats a nurse who is suffering through the physical aftermath of COVID. While Amelia continues to struggle with her and Link's different views on marriage and more children, Link prepares to propose. Determined to adopt Luna, Jo enlists Link to be Luna's temporary foster parent until Jo can legally take Luna home. By the new year, Teddy has accepted Owen's re-proposal, the entire staff of Grey Sloan has been vaccinated, and Jo has sold her shares of the hospital to Koracick. Months later in present day April 2021, Maggie and Winston finally get married. After the wedding, Amelia turns down Link's proposal, Meredith and Hayes appear to be getting closer, and Jo buys Jackson's old penthouse for her and Luna to move into. Link shows up at Jo's place, looking for a place to stay following the rejection from Amelia.

== Cast and characters ==
=== Main ===
- Ellen Pompeo as Dr. Meredith Grey
- Chandra Wilson as Dr. Miranda Bailey
- James Pickens Jr. as Dr. Richard Webber
- Kevin McKidd as Dr. Owen Hunt
- Jesse Williams as Dr. Jackson Avery
- Caterina Scorsone as Dr. Amelia Shepherd
- Camilla Luddington as Dr. Jo Wilson
- Kelly McCreary as Dr. Maggie Pierce
- Giacomo Gianniotti as Dr. Andrew DeLuca
- Kim Raver as Dr. Teddy Altman
- Greg Germann as Dr. Tom Koracick
- Jake Borelli as Dr. Levi Schmitt
- Chris Carmack as Dr. Atticus "Link" Lincoln
- Richard Flood as Dr. Cormac Hayes
- Anthony Hill as Dr. Winston Ndugu

=== Recurring ===
- Patrick Dempsey as Dr. Derek Shepherd
- Jason George as Dr. Ben Warren
- Debbie Allen as Dr. Catherine Fox
- Stefania Spampinato as Dr. Carina DeLuca
- Alex Landi as Dr. Nico Kim
- Jaicy Elliot as Dr. Taryn Helm
- Mackenzie Marsh as Val Ashton
- Lisa Vidal as Dr. Alma Ortiz
- Melissa DuPrey as Dr. Sara Ortiz
- Nikhil Shukla as Dr. Reza Khan
- Robert I. Mesa as Dr. James Chee
- Zaiver Sinnett as Dr. Zander Perez

=== Notable guests ===
- T. R. Knight as Dr. George O'Malley
- Eric Dane as Dr. Mark Sloan
- Chyler Leigh as Dr. Lexie Grey
- Sarah Drew as Dr. April Kepner
- Barrett Doss as Victoria "Vic" Hughes
- Jay Hayden as Travis Montgomery
- Grey Damon as LT Jack Gibson
- Danielle Savre as Captain Maya Bishop
- Okieriete Onaodowan as Dean Miller
- T. J. Thyne as Aaron Morris
- Dorien Wilson as Clifford Ndugu
- Sherri Saum as Allison Brown
- Frankie Faison as William Bailey
- Bianca Taylor as Elena Bailey
- Bess Armstrong as Maureen Lincoln
- Granville Ames as Eric Lincoln
- Phylicia Rashad as Nell Timms
- Eric Roberts as Robert Avery
- Kyle Harris as Dr. Mason Post
- Debra Mooney as Evelyn Hunt

== Production ==
=== Development ===
On May 10, 2019, ABC renewed Grey's Anatomy for both a sixteenth and seventeenth season. Krista Vernoff, who serves as the series showrunner and an executive producer, signed a multi-year deal with ABC Studios in 2019 to continue working on Grey's Anatomy and spin-off series Station 19. The deal also attached Vernoff's production company, Trip the Light Productions, to the series. Production on the sixteenth season was later cut short as a result of the COVID-19 pandemic, finishing only twenty-one of the twenty-five episodes ordered; at the time it was unknown whether or not the four additional episodes would be produced as part of the seventeenth season. In September 2020, Variety reported that the season would begin filming later that month. Pompeo announced that filming had begun on September 8. An ABC insider later revealed that the network was looking to produce a season of sixteen episodes, down from the twenty-four to twenty-five episodes per season that had been produced since the eighth season, but that the number could change since conditions were uncertain due to COVID. One additional episode was ordered, bringing the total episode count of the season up to seventeen.

The lower episode count caused the season to tie with the fourth for the second-lowest number of episodes, only having more than the first. To limit the spread of COVID-19, cast and crew members only worked ten-hour days compared to the usual twelve hours. The number of people in each scene also had to be reduced to allow for social distancing. Vernoff said that face masks were worn by all cast and crew members while not filming, including between takes and during rehearsals, and that speaking was not allowed in the hair and makeup trailer. Cast members carried their own makeup bags to do last-minute touch-ups, and different camera lenses were used to make people standing far apart appear closer together. In addition, the cast and crew members received testing for the virus three times a week. In March 2021, Deadline Hollywood reported that another spin-off series was in the works following an interview with ABC Entertainment President Craig Erwich. A few days later, ABC Signature President Jonnie David clarified that they only meant to show support towards Grey's Anatomy and that a spin-off was not being discussed as the network was focused on future seasons of Grey's Anatomy. Despite an initial uncertain future from Vernoff, Pompeo, and network executives, the series was renewed for an eighteenth season.

=== Casting ===
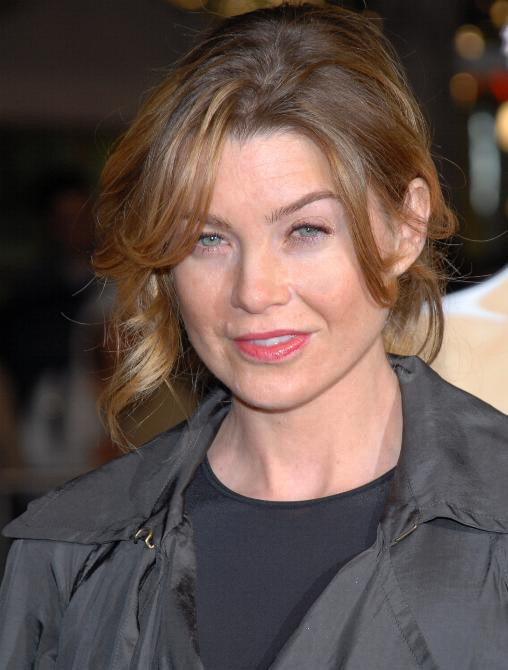
Ellen Pompeo signed a one-year contract to return, making her the highest-paid actress currently on broadcast television, receiving $575,000 per episode.

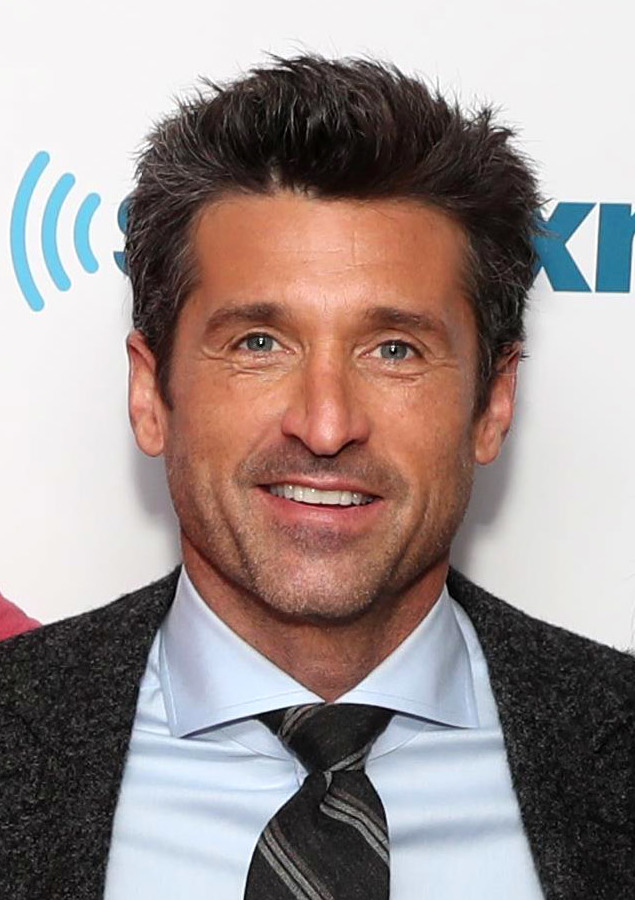
Patrick Dempsey returned to the series in a recurring capacity after a five-year absence.

Kim Raver, Camilla Luddington, and Kevin McKidd each signed a three-year contract in July 2020, keeping them attached to the series through a potential nineteenth season to portray Dr. Teddy Altman, Dr. Jo Wilson, and Dr. Owen Hunt, respectively. Pompeo signed a one-year contract to return as Dr. Meredith Grey, the title character, making $575,000 per episode and also receiving producing credits on both Grey's Anatomy and Station 19 along with a signing bonus totaling around $20 million total for her work. On July 30, 2020, it was announced that Richard Flood and Anthony Hill had been promoted to series regulars. Flood recurred in the previous season as Dr. Cormac Hayes while Hill made a guest appearance in the nineteenth episode of the sixteenth season as Dr. Winston Ndugu. Justin Chambers was the only main cast member from the previous season not to return to the series after departing early in the sixteenth season.

A number of previous series regulars appeared in the season during a storyline revolving around Meredith Grey battling COVID-19 while imagining herself on a beach. Patrick Dempsey was the first actor to return to the series as Dr. Derek Shepherd; Dempsey's last appearance was in the eleventh-season finale, "You're My Home". He recurred throughout the season, appearing in four episodes total. T. R. Knight also returned as Dr. George O'Malley in "You'll Never Walk Alone"; Knight last appeared in "Now or Never" in the fifth season. Chyler Leigh and Eric Dane both appeared in "Breathe" as Dr. Lexie Grey and Dr. Mark Sloan, respectively. Prior to their return, Leigh and Dane last appeared in the eighth-season finale "Flight" and "Remember the Time", the second episode of the ninth season. Due to travel restrictions, Leigh was not able to travel to Los Angeles where production takes place, instead she filmed her scenes in Vancouver, Canada. Leigh was filming Supergirl at the time; a green screen was used to eventually place her on the beach and an apple box was used to simulate rocks while tennis balls were used in place of Pompeo and Dane for dialogue portions.

Giacomo Gianniotti, who portrayed Dr. Andrew DeLuca, exited the series as a main character after being killed off in "Helplessly Hoping." He later appeared in two other episodes as a vision to Raver's Dr. Teddy Altman. On May 6, 2021, it was reported that Jesse Williams, who joined the series in the sixth season as Dr. Jackson Avery, would be departing as a series regular following the fifteenth episode, "Tradition". As part of his departure, former series regular Sarah Drew returned as Dr. April Kepner in Williams' penultimate episode, "Look Up Child", after last appearing in the fourteenth-season episode "All of Me". Greg Germann, who had portrayed Dr. Tom Koracick since the fourteenth season, also departed in "Tradition", being written out in the same storyline as Williams' character. Williams and Germann both briefly reprised their roles in the season finale, "Someone Saved My Life Tonight." Germann is expected to return as a guest star in later seasons while Williams said that he would be open to returning in the following season.

Stefania Spampinato continued to make recurring appearances in the season as Dr. Carina DeLuca after being promoted to a series regular on spin-off series Station 19. Debbie Allen and former series regular Jason George also continued to appear in recurring roles as Dr. Catherine Fox and Dr. Ben Warren, respectively; with George also being a series regular on Station 19. Phylicia Rashad, Allen's sister, guest starred in the season's twelfth episode, "Sign O' the Times". In addition, Barrett Doss, Jay Hayden, Grey Damon, Danielle Savre, and Okieriete Onaodowan made guest appearances as their Station 19 characters in crossover events. Mackenzie Marsh was cast in a recurring role for the season to play Val Ashton. Eric Roberts reprised his role as Robert Avery in "Look Up Child". Lisa Vidal and Melissa DuPrey recurred as a mother-daughter pair named Alma and Sara Ortiz who were part of Grey Sloan's new intern class. Robert I. Mesa was also cast in a recurring role for the season portraying James Chee, the first indigenous doctor on the series.

=== Writing ===
The overarching storyline of the season centered around the doctors in the series battling the COVID-19 pandemic. Krista Vernoff initially considered beginning the season prior to the pandemic or not including it at all, but ultimately decided to begin it in the peak of it, stating:

To be the biggest medical show and ignore the biggest medical story of the century felt irresponsible to the medical community, it just felt like we had to tell this story. The conversation became: How do we tell this painful and brutal story that has hit our medical community so intensely and permanently changed medicine? And create some escapism? And create romance, comedy and joy and fun? That's the challenge this season.

To properly tell the story of the pandemic, the writers opted to begin the season in April 2020, with time slowly progressing throughout the season, instead of telling the story from a present-day standpoint, as done in previous seasons. Zoanne Clack, a medical doctor who serves as a consultant, writer, and executive producer on the series and previously worked for the Centers for Disease Control and Prevention, said that the goal of the season was to accurately show the infection rate and transfer of COVID-19. A sub-storyline centered around the pandemic was Meredith Grey contracting COVID-19 early in the season. Grey drifted in and out of consciousness throughout the season imagining herself on a beach scene seeing past and present characters of the series. Other central characters were also written to have COVID-19 including Germann's Tom Koracick and the mother of Dr. Miranda Bailey. Bailey's portrayer Chandra Wilson stated that nursing homes, where the character's mother was located, were largely affected by COVID-19 so that when the script was given to her she knew that the experience needed to be told.

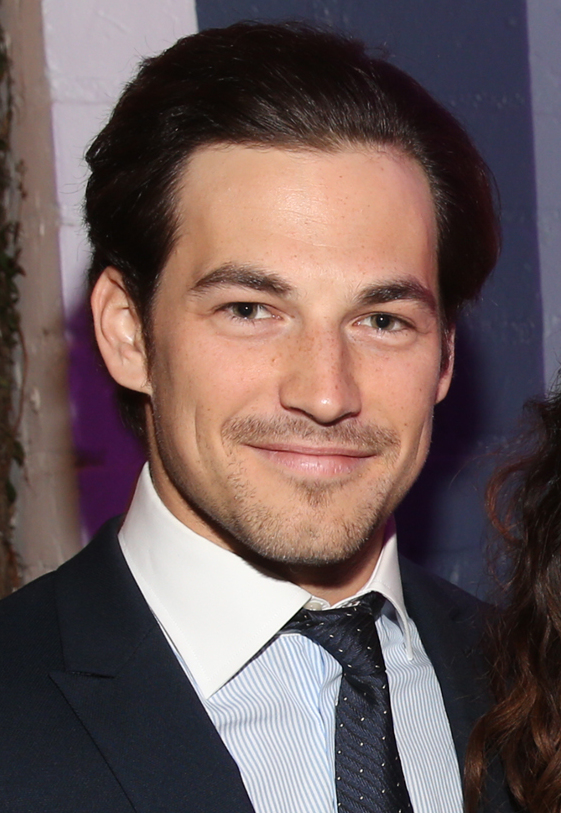
Giacomo Gianniotti's character, Dr. Andrew DeLuca, was killed off in the season during a fictional crossover event with spin-off series Station 19.

The second half of the season picked up in May 2020. These storylines in the season encompassed both Grey's Anatomy and Station 19 through fictional crossover events. One of these finished the story centered around the mental health of Gianniotti's Andrew DeLuca, which was introduced in the sixteenth season, regarding a patient that had been sexually abused and human trafficked. The storyline was finished by DeLuca's death as a result of a stabbing that occurred in Station 19. Sources close to the production of the series reported that the sixteenth season was supposed to include a character death. However, these plans were scrapped when the season was cut short due to the pandemic; Vernoff said that the death would not have been DeLuca because she wanted to show that people could experience a mental health crisis and be successful afterwards.

My reaction to [the story idea] was, 'What?! Fuck! No! Really!? This is what I'm doing?! No!' Many times after I pitched it to the writers and we designed the season around this story, I started to chicken out and second-guess myself. 'Can we save him?! Can he live?! He can't.' We've done a lot of near-deaths and saved them since I took over the show. So now people are expecting that. This was the story. It was as shocking to me as it was to you.

— Krista Vernoff on the death of Gianniotti's character.

The season also touched on other issues such as police brutality, racial profiling, and the murder of George Floyd. The episode centering around George Floyd included the internal conflict of characters deciding whether or not to participate in protests. The exit of Williams' and Germann's characters, Jackson Avery and Koracick, respectively, was explained by their characters leaving Seattle and traveling to Boston in aim to "combat the inequalities in medicine as leaders of the Avery Foundation." Germann's character stated before leaving, "I want to be an ally, I want to spend whatever time I've got left making this lousy, stinking place better, I'll operate, I'll administrate, I'll do anything. I don't want money, I don't want a title, just let me help", and explaining that while he was in the hospital with COVID-19 that he had six roommates and was the only white person. Later storylines in the season centered around COVID-19 vaccine trials and the struggles of adoption. The final two episodes featured periodic time jumps, allowing the final episode to end in April 2021.

== Release ==
=== Broadcast ===
When ABC revealed its fall schedule for the 2020–2021 broadcast television season, it was reported that the season would hold its previous timeslot of Thursdays at 9:00 pm Eastern Time (ET), serving as a lead-out of Station 19. It was later announced that the season premiere would take place on November 12, 2020. The second episode of the season aired outside its regular time slot at 10:00 pm ET, immediately following the first episode in a two-hour back-to-back timeslot. Six episodes aired prior to the mid-season finale on December 17. ABC initially planned to air the remaining episodes beginning on March 4, 2021, but delayed its return by one week. The second half of the season then began airing on March 11, 2021, with the season's seventh episode. This episode also aired outside of its regular timeslot due to a programming delay as a result of a presidential address by Joe Biden, and began broadcasting at 9:25 pm ET. The season finale aired on June 3. Internationally, the season aired in simulcast in Canada on CTV while in the United Kingdom episodes began airing on Sky Witness on April 17, 2021.

=== Home media and streaming services ===
Hulu continued to hold next-day streaming video on demand rights to the series during the season and the most recently aired episodes were also available for streaming on the ABC website. The season was added to Netflix on July 3, 2021, as part of a streaming deal that adds some ABC Shondaland series to Netflix thirty days after the final episode of the season airs. Outside of the United States, the season, along with all past seasons, was added to Star, a content hub within the Disney+ streaming service. A 4-disc DVD set containing all seventeen episodes was released in multiple regions on June 7, 2021.

== Reception ==
=== Critical response ===
Ani Bundel with NBC Think stated that the season stayed true to the medical community, noting that even though cheerful and funny moments were mixed in, viewers were not able to forget how many people had died. Alex Cranz from Jezebel felt that the season premiere crossover was "a series of memes ripped straight out of May 2020 instead of November 2020", writing that he would have liked to see the episodes three to four months earlier. TVLine's Charlie Mason mentioned that the rules of Meredith's beach were confusing because she was able to see people that were both dead and alive, also saying that although it seemed nice at first, it eventually lost its appeal. Meanwhile, Jack Wilhelmi from Screen Rant said that the return of Patrick Dempsey to the series was a "major mistake"; however, Saloni Gajjar of The A.V. Club stated that all of the former series regulars that returned during the season helped bring nostalgia to the series, particularly mentioning Sarah Drew giving Williams' character a believable exit. Rebecca Nicholson from The Guardian said that the show properly made what is considered the new normal, normal.

=== Awards and nominations ===
Patrick Dempsey and T. R. Knight both received a nomination in the 2021 Gold Derby Awards for Best Drama Guest Actor. The award was lost to Charles Dance for his work on The Crown. The season was awarded The ReFrame Stamp, a certification given to scripted television productions that hire "women or individuals of other underrepresented gender identities/expressions [...] in four out of eight key roles including writer, director, producer, lead, co-leads, and department heads." At the 47th People's Choice Awards Grey's Anatomy was nominated for The Show of 2021 and The Drama Show of 2021. Ellen Pompeo also received nominations as The Female TV Star of 2021 and The Drama TV Star of 2021, both for her work on the series. The Drama Show of 2021 and The Female TV star of 2021 both won in their respective categories, while the other two nominations went to Loki and Chase Stokes for Outer Banks, respectively. For the 33rd GLAAD Media Awards Grey's Anatomy received its tenth nomination for Outstanding Drama Series, an award in which nominated television series must have an LGBT character in a leading, supporting, or recurring role; but it was ultimately awarded to Pose. Chandra Wilson also received an Outstanding Supporting Actress in a Drama Series nomination for her work on the series at the 53rd NAACP Image Awards. This award was lost to Mary J. Blige for Power Book II: Ghost.

=== Ratings ===
The season was ABC's most-watched television series during the 2020–2021 television season. Throughout its broadcast, in same-day viewership, the season averaged a 1.02 rating (Note: In Nielsen ratings, a rating is a fraction of the total number of households with televisions compared to the number of television sets tuned into a specific program.) in the 18–49 demographic and 5.17 million viewers, down 20 and 17 percent, respectively, from the previous season. In Live+7 (Note: Live+7 data includes the number of viewers watching episodes within seven days of its original broadcast by means of DVR and streaming video on demand.) the season averaged a 1.9 rating in the 18–49 demographic and 8.16 million viewers, down 17 and 13 percent from the sixteenth season.

Viewership and ratings per episode of Grey's Anatomy season 17
No.	Title	Air date	Timeslot (ET)	Rating (18–49)	Viewers (millions)	DVR (18–49)	DVR viewers (millions)	Total (18–49)	Total viewers (millions)
1–2	"All Tomorrow's Parties" "The Center Won't Hold"	November 12, 2020	Thursday; 9:00 p.m.	1.3	5.96	1.2	3.78	2.6	9.74
3	"My Happy Ending"	November 19, 2020	Thursday; 9:00 p.m.	1.3	5.99	1.0	—N/a	2.3	—N/a
4	"You'll Never Walk Alone"	December 3, 2020	Thursday; 9:00 p.m.	1.2	5.84	0.9	2.99	2.2	8.86
5	"Fight the Power"	December 10, 2020	Thursday; 9:00 p.m.	1.2	5.69	0.8	2.62	2.0	8.31
6	"No Time for Despair"	December 17, 2020	Thursday; 9:00 p.m.	1.1	5.66	—N/a	—N/a	—N/a	—N/a
7	"Helplessly Hoping"	March 11, 2021	Thursday; 9:25 p.m.	0.9	5.11	0.8	3.14	1.7	8.26
8	"It's All Too Much"	March 18, 2021	Thursday; 9:00 p.m.	1.0	4.97	—N/a	—N/a	—N/a	—N/a
9	"In My Life"	March 25, 2021	Thursday; 9:00 p.m.	0.9	4.99	—N/a	—N/a	—N/a	—N/a
10	"Breathe"	April 1, 2021	Thursday; 9:00 p.m.	0.9	4.55	0.7	2.29	1.6	6.84 (Note: Live+7 ratings were not available, so Live+3 ratings have been used instead.)
11	"Sorry Doesn't Always Make It Right"	April 8, 2021	Thursday; 9:00 p.m.	0.9	4.83	0.8	2.79	1.7	7.62
12	"Sign O' the Times"	April 15, 2021	Thursday; 9:00 p.m.	0.9	4.98	—N/a	—N/a	—N/a	—N/a
13	"Good as Hell"	April 22, 2021	Thursday; 9:00 p.m.	0.9	4.81	0.8	2.72	1.7	7.53
14	"Look Up Child"	May 6, 2021	Thursday; 9:00 p.m.	1.0	4.93	0.8	2.75	1.8	7.68
15	"Tradition"	May 20, 2021	Thursday; 9:00 p.m.	0.8	4.58	0.7	2.60	1.6	7.19
16	"I'm Still Standing"	May 27, 2021	Thursday; 9:00 p.m.	0.7	4.33	0.8	2.60	1.5	6.93
17	"Someone Saved My Life Tonight"	June 3, 2021	Thursday; 9:00 p.m.	0.8	4.76	0.7	2.53	1.5	7.29
