= Grey's Anatomy season 8 =

Season of television series

Grey's Anatomy
- Season 8
- DVD cover art for the eighth season of Grey's Anatomy
- Showrunner: Shonda Rhimes
- Starring: Ellen Pompeo; Sandra Oh; Justin Chambers; Chandra Wilson; James Pickens Jr.; Sara Ramirez; Eric Dane; Chyler Leigh; Kevin McKidd; Jessica Capshaw; Kim Raver; Sarah Drew; Jesse Williams; Patrick Dempsey
- No. of episodes: 24

Release
- Original network: ABC
- Original release: September 22, 2011 – May 17, 2012

Season chronology
- ← Previous; Season 7 Next → Season 9

The eighth season of the American television medical drama Grey's Anatomy, commenced airing on the American Broadcasting Company (ABC) on September 22, 2011, with a special 2-hour episode and ended on May 17, 2012 with the eighth season having a total of 24 episodes. The season was produced by ABC Studios, in association with Shondaland Production Company and The Mark Gordon Company, and overseen by showrunners Shonda Rhimes, Tony Phelan and Joan Rater.

This season follows the storyline of Meredith Grey (Ellen Pompeo) and Derek Shepherd (Patrick Dempsey) as they try to save their marriage and adopt Zola after Meredith tampered with the Alzheimer's trial in the previous season. Miranda Bailey (Chandra Wilson) also struggles to forgive Meredith because Richard Webber (James Pickens Jr.) takes the blame for Meredith and steps down from his role of Chief of Surgery, and Owen Hunt (Kevin McKidd) takes his place. Cristina Yang (Sandra Oh) decides to have an abortion, putting her relationship with Hunt at odds. Callie Torres (Sara Ramirez) and Arizona Robbins (Jessica Capshaw) co-parent their baby with Mark Sloan (Eric Dane) who continues to have an on/off relationship with Lexie Grey (Chyler Leigh). Alex Karev (Justin Chambers) deals with the fallout of his decision to tell Owen about Meredith altering the Alzheimer's trial, and becomes an outcast by the other residents. Teddy Altman (Kim Raver) marries Henry Burton (Scott Foley), who later dies of a heart condition, leaving her devastated.

The season hit the series' low for ratings as it ended with an average of 10.92 million viewers ranking at #34 and in the 18-49 key demographic ranked at #12. Loretta Devine garnered critical acclaim for her portrayal of Adele Webber and earned numerous nominations including the Primetime Emmy Awards for Outstanding Guest Actress in a Drama Series and the Critics' Choice Television Awards. James Pickens, Jr. won Outstanding Supporting Actor at the NAACP Image Awards, and Chandra Wilson and Sandra Oh both received nominations for Outstanding Actress in a Drama. Stacy McKee was nominated for Humanitas Prize for writing "White Wedding". Sara Ramirez was nominated at the 13th ALMA Awards for Favorite TV Supporting Actress. For the 38th People's Choice Awards, the show was nominated for Favorite TV Drama, and Ellen Pompeo and Patrick Dempsey were respectively nominated for Favorite TV Drama Actress and Favorite TV Drama Actor.

The website Screen Rant ranked the season #12 on their 2023 ranking of the 19 Grey's Anatomy seasons.

== Episodes ==
The number in the "No. in series" column refers to the episode's number within the overall series, whereas the number in the "No. in season" column refers to the episode's number within this particular season. "U.S. viewers in millions" refers to the number of Americans in millions who watched the episodes live. Each episode of this season is named after a song.

No. overall	No. in season	Title	Directed by	Written by	Original release date	Prod. code	U.S. viewers (millions)
149	1	"Free Falling"	Rob Corn	Tony Phelan & Joan Rater	September 22, 2011	801	10.38
A giant sinkhole opens up in the middle of Seattle, where Callie, Owen, and Alex are sent to help the first responders. April is struggling to settle into her place as Chief Resident, finding it difficult to persuade her fellow residents to respect her position. Cristina and Owen are not speaking to each other, as they do not see eye-to-eye on what to do about Cristina's unplanned pregnancy. In response to Meredith's actions at the end of last season, the hospital board decides that Meredith should be fired as a resident at Seattle Grace Mercy West Hospital. The loss of her job only adds more strain to Meredith and Derek's already precarious relationship, as well as increasing complications to their current attempt at adopting Zola. Social Services realizes that Meredith has been fired and that she and Derek are not currently living together, causing Meredith to panic. The episode closes with Meredith taking Zola from daycare, seemingly taking her away from the Hospital without permission.
150	2	"She's Gone"	Tony Phelan	Debora Cahn	September 22, 2011	802	10.38
The sinkhole crisis continues, with the patients that the surgeons helped rescue now within the Hospital. Dr. Bailey and the other attendings give the residents a patient that they must all work together to save, in order to see which resident will come out as a leader. Cristina makes a decision regarding her unplanned pregnancy, and Owen goes with her to her abortion. Social Services and Derek spend the day searching for Meredith and Zola, and when Cristina finds Meredith hiding in the hospital she enlists Alex to pretend that he has been seeing Zola as a patient all day. Richard goes to the hospital board and lies to them, telling them that Meredith only destroyed Derek's clinical trial under his own orders. Because of this, Meredith is able to keep her job.
151	3	"Take the Lead"	Chandra Wilson	William Harper	September 29, 2011	803	10.20
Dr. Webber announces that he is resigning as Chief of Surgery, and that Dr. Hunt will be replacing him as chief. April continues to struggle to gain respect from the residents while in her role as Chief Resident. The 5th year residents are given their first solo surgeries. Cristina and Owen try to find normalcy in their relationship after her unplanned pregnancy. They spend the episode attempting to awkwardly engage, and their relationship only goes back to normal after they get food poisoning together. Derek, still very angry at Meredith, tells her that while he will not walk away from their relationship, he cannot trust her at work. In response to this, Meredith decides she will no longer pursue neurosurgery, and they agree that if they want to fix their relationship and have a chance of adopting Zola they cannot work together. Absent: Chyler Leigh as Lexie Grey due to family leave
152	4	"What Is It About Men"	Tom Verica	Stacy McKee	October 6, 2011	804	8.70
Ben returns and Miranda is skeptical of his arrival, until Ben realizes that she has finally moved on. A stampede at a comic convention causes the ER to be inundated with colorful costume-bearers. This episode centers largely on the men of Seattle Grace as opposed to focusing on the women.
153	5	"Loss, Love and Legacy"	Stephen Cragg	Denise Hahn	October 13, 2011	805	9.97
Jackson's mother, Dr. Catherine Avery, comes to Seattle Grace for a groundbreaking transplant surgery. Zola comes into the hospital. Alex and Arizona must deal with the confidentiality issue with Derek and Meredith. Teddy throws a house warming party. Eli and Miranda break up.
154	6	"Poker Face"	Kevin McKidd	Peter Nowalk	October 20, 2011	806	9.54
April steps up as Chief Resident while managing a clinical trial. Callie and Cristina deal with a difficult spinal surgery while Alex and Teddy must find alternative ways to operate on a patient. Meredith struggles to follow her new rule of not talking to Derek about work while at the hospital.
155	7	"Put Me In, Coach"	Debbie Allen	Jeannine Renshaw	October 27, 2011	807	9.93
In order to stress cooperation and teamwork, Owen enters the doctors into a softball league where they will compete against Seattle Presbyterian, the other hospital in Seattle. Derek and Lexie deliberate a treatment plan when a desperate mother of a girl with an inoperable brain tumor specifically seeks his help. Richard tries to repair Miranda and Meredith's working relationship. Lexie becomes jealous over Mark dating a new woman, and Alex fights to keep Zola at Seattle Grace.
156	8	"Heart-Shaped Box"	Jessica Yu	Austin Guzman	November 3, 2011	808	9.52
A medical miracle occurs, leaving the residents feeling inspired. Louise O'Malley returns to Seattle Grace after a surgery was botched by a different hospital, causing the residents to reminisce about all the times they had with George. Arizona makes friends with a new pediatric fellow, making Alex feel threatened. Teddy and Henry fight over Henry wanting to attend medical school.
157	9	"Dark Was the Night"	Allison Liddi-Brown	Debora Cahn	November 10, 2011	809	11.29
Teddy brings Henry into the ER after finding him at home vomiting blood; while Meredith gets news from Janet that she and Derek aren't going to get Zola back. Just as Teddy waits on Henry's CT she is called onto another case, the case being Callie and Jackson's spinal surgery, whose heart is now bleeding uncontrollably. After deciding to operate on Callie's patient, Teddy decides to get Cristina to operate on Henry, with Dr. Webber and Lexie in with her, only not to tell her that it's him. Meredith and Alex go to a neighboring hospital to help a new premature baby, since the hospital doesn't have the equipment to save the baby's life; After believing that Henry is in the clear, Cristina finds that the tumor had gone into the heart; after twenty minutes of performing CPR Cristina calls time of death, only moments later to find out it was Henry. After their ambulance breaks down, Alex and Meredith call Arizona, Mark, and Derek to see if they knew how to take care of the baby, only for the ambulance to crash while on the phone; When Meredith and Alex step out, they see that a car with victims in it was what hit them.
158	10	"Suddenly"	Ron Underwood	Stacy McKee	January 5, 2012	810	12.12
The ER is swamped by victims from the crash which involved a family car and Alex and Meredith's ambulance. Alex and Meredith fight to save the lives of a family; after realizing that telling Teddy about Henry's death would stop her from saving her patient's life, Owen decides to not tell Teddy until she is out of surgery. When Meredith and Alex get back to the hospital they try to save the family's life, only for all but the father and the children of the family to die immediately. While operating on the youngest child of the family, Derek and Mark realize that they need help if they are going to save the child's eye, only to call Mark's ophthalmologist girlfriend, Julia, in to assist them, with Lexie assisting Derek. Arizona and Alex work to save the life of the baby that they brought from the hospital. Cristina struggles whether or not to tell Teddy about Henry in the middle of a critical surgery. At the end of the episode, Meredith and Derek get full custody of Zola back.
159	11	"This Magic Moment"	Steve Robin	Zoanne Clack	January 12, 2012	811	10.71
A risky surgery which involves conjoined twins has the doctors split into two teams. Meredith unwittingly finds herself acting as a buffer between Miranda and Ben, Alex is taught a lesson in the O.R. by Webber, and Teddy makes everyone in her O.R. uncomfortable when she has Cristina recount the events leading up to Henry's death. Back at home, Derek and Meredith find joy in parenthood.
160	12	"Hope for the Hopeless"	Mark Jackson	Peter Nowalk	January 19, 2012	812	9.42
A pair of bickering sisters come in for a liver transplant performed by Richard, making it his 10,000th surgery. Meredith must choose a new specialty, Derek and Lexie operate on a previously inoperable neuroblastoma, and Teddy and Cristina defy Owen and steal a case from Alex. Adele is brought to Seattle Grace after being found wandering the streets. She is brought to the OR gallery to see Richard performing his milestone surgery where an emotionally taxing moment occurs revealing the full extent of her Alzheimer's.
161	13	"If/Then"	Jeannot Szwarc	William Harper	February 2, 2012	813	9.71
Meredith dreams of an alternative universe in which her mother, Ellis Grey, never had Alzheimer's and is a more supportive and loving mother. This leads Meredith to be a happy version of herself, causing Seattle Grace to be completely different. She and Cristina are enemies while April is her best friend, who is sleeping with Meredith's fiancé, Alex, who is only with Meredith because of her family's legacy. Owen has married Callie and they have 3 children, although they are not happy. Addison and Derek are expecting a child, only it is revealed that the baby is actually Mark's, and Addison and Derek's relationship is falling apart just as Derek's own career is also stagnating. Lexie has become an orphan and a drug addict. It is revealed that George failed his boards and was never seen again while Meredith turned Izzie in to her mother for her relationship with a patient, alluding to Denny (Jeffrey Dean Morgan), firing her. Richard left Adele and married Ellis, and Meredith took Webber as her last name. The episode ends reminiscent of how Derek and Meredith first met. Throughout the entire episode all the couples that actually do exist seem to have connections, which includes Callie and Arizona, and also Yang and Owen. Absent: Kim Raver as Teddy Altman
162	14	"All You Need Is Love"	Rob Corn	Jeannine Renshaw	February 9, 2012	814	10.27
It's Valentine's Day at Seattle Grace and the ER fills with romantics. The singles, Lexie and Mark, are stuck on babysitting duty. Miranda and Ben's plans are ruined when she is called away to a series of emergencies but Ben surprises her at the end of the day. Meanwhile, Owen and Cristina keep avoiding each other after their big fight.
163	15	"Have You Seen Me Lately?"	Tony Phelan	Austin Guzman	February 16, 2012	815	8.31
During marriage counselling sessions, Owen and Cristina are constantly engaging in heated arguments. Owen cannot seem to move past the fact that Cristina does not want kids. Amelia arrives at Seattle Grace hoping to convince Derek to assist her with Erica's (A.J. Langer) gliosarcoma. Lexie gets caught in between the two Shepherds, Meredith shows off her surgical skills, Alex learns the importance of people skills when one of his interns gets sick, Mark and Jackson teach Dr. Bailey a lesson, and the residents continue to prep for their oral boards. This episode begins a crossover with Private Practice that concludes on "You Break My Heart".
164	16	"If Only You Were Lonely"	Susan Vaill	Matt Byrne	February 23, 2012	816	9.06
A coffee shop explodes, flooding the ER with patients. Richard reassesses his living situation with Adele as she continues to deteriorate before his very eyes. Callie assists Meredith with studying for her boards, Lexie assists on a peds case with Arizona and Alex, and Mark encourages Jackson to relieve his stress. Meanwhile, Cristina's suspicions get the better of her as she thinks Owen is cheating on her with a nurse.
165	17	"One Step Too Far"	Edward Ornelas	William Harper	March 15, 2012	817	9.62
Derek encourages a hesitant Meredith to work with him again in neurosurgery, but the results are less than ideal; Jackson’s mother, Catherine Avery, returns to Seattle Grace with a urology fellow and develops an interest in Richard; and Cristina becomes increasingly suspicious of Owen’s every move. Meanwhile, Alex tries to deny everyone's observations that his intern Morgan may be falling for him.
166	18	"The Lion Sleeps Tonight"	Mark Jackson	Stacy McKee	April 5, 2012	818	8.19
A lion breaks loose in Seattle and leaves a trail of victims in its midst; Lexie overhears Mark's discussion about moving in with Julia; Teddy begins to take steps towards coming to terms with Henry's death; Callie grills Arizona on her past lovers; and Alex requests to be taken off Morgan's preemie case when she becomes too dependent on him. Meanwhile, Meredith tries to be a support for Cristina as the tension between her and Owen hits a boiling point after Owen cheats on Cristina.
167	19	"Support System"	Allison Liddi-Brown	Heather Mitchell	April 12, 2012	819	8.85
Cristina and Owen call in sick to work out their marriage at home, but in the end Owen moves out. Mark takes his appointment as interim chief very seriously, much to the attendings' annoyance. Arizona, Callie and Miranda plan a special night for Teddy.
168	20	"The Girl With No Name"	Ron Underwood	Peter Nowalk	April 19, 2012	820	9.82
The doctors work on a Jane Doe, who turns out to be the subject of a case that gained national interest. Cristina proves to be in highest demand as the residents begin their interviews for post-residency positions at prospective hospitals while the attendings find ways to keep their best residents in Seattle. Richard is faced with an unsettling realization when he visits Adele at Rose Ridge.
169	21	"Moment of Truth"	Chandra Wilson	Zakiyyah Alexander	April 26, 2012	821	9.45
The residents travel to San Francisco for the oral boards. Sparks fly when Richard and Catherine (Debbie Allen) bump into each other at a hotel. Alex feels guilty about being away from the hospital as Tommy's health takes a turn for the worse. April loses her virginity to Jackson.
170	22	"Let the Bad Times Roll"	Kevin McKidd	Matt Byrne	May 3, 2012	822	9.24
The residents agonize over their upcoming exam results. Arizona's childhood friend needs medical help. The doctors try to help a patient who is missing one third of his skull. Julia wants to start a family with Mark, causing Lexie to finally tell him how she feels.
171	23	"Migration"	Stephen Cragg	Mark Wilding & Jenna Bans	May 10, 2012	823	9.82
The 5th years make their final decisions regarding their post residency plans. Mark confides in Derek about being torn between Lexie and Julia. Arizona encourages a childhood friend to have surgery, and Ben plans something for Miranda, who is preoccupied with work. Meredith, Derek, Cristina, Mark, Lexie and Alex are scheduled to fly to assist in a surgery at a hospital in Boise, though Arizona takes Alex's place after she discovers he is planning to leave Seattle Grace for Johns Hopkins Hospital. However, en route their plane crashes in the woods, leaving their fates unknown.
172	24	"Flight"	Rob Corn	Shonda Rhimes	May 17, 2012	824	11.44
Meredith, Derek, Cristina, Lexie, Mark, and Arizona are in a plane crash in the middle of the woods. They discover that Lexie has had her lower abdomen and legs crushed under part of the plane, and she dies shortly after due to her injuries. Derek was blown away from the scene of the crash, and he wakes up to find his hand trapped in a piece of metal pinning him to the ground. In order to get up to find the others in the crash, he breaks his hand with a rock so he can remove it from the metal. Arizona suffers a severe injury to her leg, and the pilot of the plane appears to be paralyzed. Shortly after Derek returns to the site of the crash, they discover that Mark suffered internal injuries and Cristina must perform a surgical procedure on him with what they have on hand. In the contrasting storyline, the doctors at Seattle Grace Mercy West have no idea that something has happened to their colleagues and loved ones in the plane crash. The residents who were not on the plane reluctantly prepare to attend a dinner that Dr. Webber is holding for them, a yearly tradition for the exiting resident class. Ben and Miranda fight over the fact that he will be joining a surgical internship in LA. Teddy is offered a job as a chief at MEDCOM, but says she will not take it. When Owen pushes her on the subject, she tells him that she is staying for him, because he needs support. Because of this, Owen fires Teddy, telling her to go be great at MEDCOM.

== Cast and characters ==
=== Main ===
- Ellen Pompeo as Dr. Meredith Grey
- Sandra Oh as Dr. Cristina Yang
- Justin Chambers as Dr. Alex Karev
- Chandra Wilson as Dr. Miranda Bailey
- James Pickens Jr. as Dr. Richard Webber
- Sara Ramirez as Dr. Callie Torres
- Eric Dane as Dr. Mark Sloan
- Chyler Leigh as Dr. Lexie Grey
- Kevin McKidd as Dr. Owen Hunt
- Jessica Capshaw as Dr. Arizona Robbins
- Kim Raver as Dr. Teddy Altman
- Sarah Drew as Dr. April Kepner
- Jesse Williams as Dr. Jackson Avery
- Patrick Dempsey as Dr. Derek Shepherd

=== Recurring ===
- Jason George as Dr. Ben Warren
- Jela K. Moore as Zola
- Scott Foley as Henry Burton
- Loretta Devine as Adele Webber
- Daniel Sunjata as Nurse Eli
- Debbie Allen as Catherine Avery
- Janora McDuffie as Social Worker Janet
- Holley Fain as Dr. Julia Canner
- Amanda Fuller as Intern Morgan Peterson
- Summer Glau as Nurse Emily Kovach
- Nicole Cummins as Paramedic Nicole

=== Notable guests ===
- Kate Walsh as Dr. Addison Montgomery
- Caterina Scorsone as Dr. Amelia Shepherd
- Debra Monk as Louise O'Malley
- Kate Burton as Ellis Grey
- Robert Baker as Dr. Charles Percy
- Alfre Woodard as Justine Campbell
- Stella Maeve as Lilly
- William Daniels as Dr. Craig Thomas
- Nia Vardalos as Karen
- Peri Gilpin as Marcy
- Vanessa Marano as Holly Wheeler
- Mitch Pileggi as Lawrence Jennings
- Lee Majors as Chuck Cain
- Ernie Hudson as Brad McDougall
- Jordan Belfi as Nick
- Cynthia Watros as Ms. Konner
- Mark Saul as Dr. Steve Mostow
- James LeGros as Pilot Jerry
- Holland Roden as Gretchen Shaw
- Rebecca Hazlewood as Dr. Mara Keaton
- James Avery as Sam
- David DeLuise as Charlie Connor

== Reception ==
=== Ratings ===
==== Live +SD ratings ====
No. in series	No. in season	Episode	Air date	Time slot (EST)	18–49 (Rating/Share)	Viewers (m)	18–49 Rank	Rank out of Top 25
149	1	"Free Falling"	September 22, 2011	Thursdays; 9:00 P.M.	4.1/10	10.38	21	—N/a
150	2	"She's Gone"	September 22, 2011	Thursdays; 9:00 P.M.	4.1/10	10.38	21	—N/a
151	3	"Take the Lead"	September 29, 2011	Thursdays; 9:00 P.M.	3.6/9	10.20	16	—N/a
152	4	"What Is It About Men"	October 6, 2011	Thursdays; 9:00 P.M.	3.1/8	8.70	24	—N/a
153	5	"Love, Loss and Legacy"	October 13, 2011	Thursdays; 9:00 P.M.	3.6/9	9.97	16	—N/a
154	6	"Poker Face"	October 20, 2011	Thursdays; 9:00 P.M.	3.6/9	9.54	18	—N/a
155	7	"Put Me In, Coach"	October 27, 2011	Thursdays; 9:00 P.M.	3.7/9	9.93	18	—N/a
156	8	"Heart Shaped Box"	November 3, 2011	Thursdays; 9:00 P.M.	3.6/9	9.52	20	—N/a
157	9	"Dark Was the Night"	November 10, 2011	Thursdays; 9:00 P.M.	4.1/10	11.29	10	20
158	10	"Suddenly"	January 5, 2012	Thursdays; 9:00 P.M.	4.5/11	12.12	5	8
159	11	"This Magic Moment"	January 12, 2012	Thursdays; 9:00 P.M.	3.8/10	10.71	11	15
160	12	"Hope for the Hopeless"	January 19, 2012	Thursdays; 9:00 P.M.	3.5/8	9.42	11	21
161	13	"If/Then"	February 2, 2012	Thursdays; 9:00 P.M.	3.6/9	9.71	8	15
162	14	"All You Need Is Love"	February 9, 2012	Thursdays; 9:00 P.M.	4.0/10	10.27	10	22
163	15	"Have You Seen Me Lately?"	February 16, 2012	Thursdays; 9:00 P.M.	3.2/8	8.31	12	—N/a
164	16	"If Only You Were Lonely"	February 23, 2012	Thursdays; 9:00 P.M.	3.1/8	9.06	15	—N/a
165	17	"One Step Too Far"	March 15, 2012	Thursdays; 9:00 P.M.	3.0/8	9.62	6	13
166	18	"The Lion Sleeps Tonight"	April 5, 2012	Thursdays; 9:00 P.M.	2.8/8	8.16	13	—N/a
167	19	"Support System"	April 12, 2012	Thursdays; 9:00 P.M.	2.9/8	8.85	14	24
168	20	"The Girl With No Name"	April 19, 2012	Thursdays; 9:00 P.M.	3.3/9	9.82	8	13
169	21	"Moment of Truth"	April 26, 2012	Thursdays; 9:00 P.M.	3.3/9	9.45	6	16
170	22	"Let the Bad Times Roll"	May 3, 2012	Thursdays; 9:00 P.M.	3.3/9	9.24	8	24
171	23	"Migration"	May 10, 2012	Thursdays; 9:00 P.M.	3.5/10	9.82	8	23
172	24	"Flight"	May 17, 2012	Thursdays; 9:00 P.M.	4.1/11	11.44	3	13

==== Live + 7 Day (DVR) ratings ====
No. in Series	No. in Season	Episode	Air Date	Timeslot (EST)	18–49 rating increase	Viewers (millions) increase	Total 18-49	Total viewers (millions)	Ref
149	1	"Free Falling"	September 22, 2011	Thursdays; 9:00 P.M.	1.7	3.54	5.8	13.92	
150	2	"She's Gone"	September 22, 2011	Thursdays; 9:00 P.M.	1.7	3.54	5.8	13.92	
151	3	"Take the Lead"	September 29, 2011	Thursdays; 9:00 P.M.	1.5	2.95	5.1	13.15	
152	4	"What Is It About Men"	October 6, 2011	Thursdays; 9:00 P.M.	1.7	3.29	4.8	11.99	
153	5	"Love, Loss and Legacy"	October 13, 2011	Thursdays; 9:00 P.M.	1.5	2.93	5.1	12.90	
154	6	"Poker Face"	October 20, 2011	Thursdays; 9:00 P.M.	1.6	3.06	5.2	12.59	
155	7	"Put Me In, Coach"	October 27, 2011	Thursdays; 9:00 P.M.	1.6	3.14	5.3	13.07	
156	8	"Heart Shaped Box"	November 3, 2011	Thursdays; 9:00 P.M.	1.6	3.21	5.2	12.74	
157	9	"Dark Was the Night"	November 10, 2011	Thursdays; 9:00 P.M.	1.5	2.96	5.6	14.25	
158	10	"Suddenly"	January 5, 2012	Thursdays; 9:00 P.M.	1.6	2.96	6.1	15.08	
159	11	"This Magic Moment"	January 12, 2012	Thursdays; 9:00 P.M.	1.6	3.00	5.4	13.71	
160	12	"Hope for the Hopeless"	January 19, 2012	Thursdays; 9:00 P.M.	1.7	3.26	5.2	12.68	
161	13	"If/Then"	February 2, 2012	Thursdays; 9:00 P.M.	1.4	2.91	5.0	12.62	
162	14	"All You Need Is Love"	February 9, 2012	Thursdays; 9:00 P.M.	1.6	3.35	5.6	13.61	
163	15	"Have You Seen Me Lately?"	February 16, 2012	Thursdays; 9:00 P.M.	1.5	3.25	4.7	11.55	
164	16	"If Only You Were Lonely"	February 23, 2012	Thursdays; 9:00 P.M.	1.6	3.14	4.7	12.20	
165	17	"One Step Too Far"	March 15, 2012	Thursdays; 9:00 P.M.	1.5	2.83	4.5	12.45	
166	18	"The Lion Sleeps Tonight"	April 5, 2012	Thursdays; 9:00 P.M.	1.5	3.01	4.3	11.18	
167	19	"Support System"	April 12, 2012	Thursdays; 9:00 P.M.	1.6	3.10	4.5	11.93	
168	20	"The Girl With No Name"	April 19, 2012	Thursdays; 9:00 P.M.	1.5	3.04	4.8	12.86	
169	21	"Moment of Truth"	April 26, 2012	Thursdays; 9:00 P.M.	1.4	2.88	4.7	12.33	
170	22	"Let the Bad Times Roll"	May 3, 2012	Thursdays; 9:00 P.M.	1.5	2.89	4.8	12.13	
171	23	"Migration"	May 10, 2012	Thursdays; 9:00 P.M.	1.4	2.90	4.9	12.72	
172	24	"Flight"	May 17, 2012	Thursdays; 9:00 P.M.	1.2	2.53	5.3	13.98	

=== Critical response ===
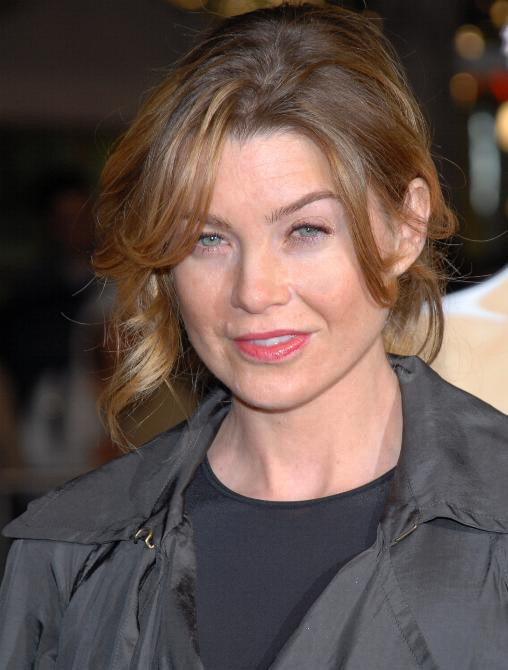
Poptimal'‍s Tanya Lane stated that Ellen Pompeo gave one of her best performances in the season finale.

The season received mixed-to-positive reviews. Tanner Stransky of Cinema Blend gave a fresh review to the season, "Juxtaposed against that nightmare that launched season 8's 2-hour season premiere was exactly what the show does portray rather accurately (most of the time) - the relationship drama."

Verne Gay of Newsday acknowledged the following for the show stating, "Grey's has had a good season and has an intensely loyal fan base to prove it." TV Fanatic reviewing the episode Free Falling wrote, "This episode set the season in motion, and from the looks of it, it's going to be good."

Carrie Raisler of The A.V. Club gave a negative review to the season's alternate-reality episode, "Just because a show is meant to be fun doesn't mean it shouldn't have standards, and this episode just simply didn't measure up."

Poptimal'‍s Tanya Lane regarding the season finale wrote, "Wow…just wow. Grey's Anatomy has once again managed to shock with its season finale." While she appreciated the "realism and authenticity that Grey's is known for", she found the episode was "almost too much" as it was "extremely gory and difficult to watch, initially because of the grisly wounds" but later because of the "heavy and emotional things that transpired". She added that "Ellen Pompeo gave one of her best performances when her character learned that her sister was dead."

GLAAD highlighted the season's portrayal of Callie Torres and Arizona Robbins as a married same-sex couple raising a child together, describing them as one of the few LGBT families represented on broadcast television during the 2011–2012 season.

== DVD release ==
Grey's Anatomy: The Complete Eighth Season - Extraordinary Moments
Set Details		Special Features
24 Episodes (1 extended); 6-Disc Set; English (Dolby Digital 5.1 Surround); Subtitles: English SDH, Spanish & French; Runtime: 1037 minutes		A Journey Home With Kevin McKidd; Extended Episode - "If/Then"; Deleted Scenes; In Stitches: Season 8 Outtakes
Release Dates
Region 1	Region 2	Region 4
September 4, 2012	December 3, 2012	October 17, 2012
