= Lexie Grey =

Character from the television show Grey's Anatomy

- Grey's Anatomy character
- Chyler Leigh as Lexie Grey
- First appearance: As guest star: "Testing 1-2-3" (3.24); May 10, 2007; As series regular: "A Change Is Gonna Come" (4.01); September 27, 2007
- Last appearance: As series regular: "Flight" (8.24); May 17, 2012; As special guest star: "Breathe" (17.10); April 1, 2021
- Created by: Shonda Rhimes
- Portrayed by: Chyler Leigh

In-universe information
- Full name: Alexandra Caroline Grey
- Nicknames: Three, Lexipedia, Little Grey
- Title: M.D.
- Occupation: Surgical intern at Seattle Grace Hospital (seasons 4–5); Surgical resident at Seattle Grace Mercy West Hospital (seasons 6–8)
- Family: Thatcher Grey (father; deceased); Susan Grey (mother; deceased); Molly Grey-Thompson (sister); Meredith Grey (half-sister)
- Significant others: Jackson Avery (ex-boyfriend); Alex Karev (ex-boyfriend); Mark Sloan (soulmate; deceased)
- Relatives: Eric Thompson (brother-in-law); Laura Grey-Thompson (niece); Derek Shepherd (brother-in-law; deceased); Zola Grey Shepherd (niece); Derek Bailey Shepherd (nephew); Ellis Shepherd (niece)
- Nationality: American
- Alma mater: Harvard University (MD)
- Born: 1984
- Died: 2012
- Status: Deceased

Alexandra Caroline "Lexie" Grey, M.D. is a fictional character from the ABC medical drama television series Grey's Anatomy. The character was created by Shonda Rhimes and is portrayed by Chyler Leigh.

She was first mentioned in Season 2 before being introduced in Season 3 as the half-sister of protagonist Meredith Grey (Ellen Pompeo). Leigh was initially contracted for a multi-episode story arc but received star-billing from seasons 4 through 8. She also reprised her role on the spin-off series Private Practice.

Characterized by Rhimes as a "dork" with issues expressing her feelings, Lexie transfers to the fictional Seattle Grace Hospital as a surgical intern following the sudden death of her mother, Susan Grey (Mare Winningham). She eventually progresses to the position of surgical resident. Her main storylines throughout the series focus on her struggles with the pressures of a highly competitive profession, her initially strained relationship with Meredith, and her on-again, off-again romance with Mark Sloan (Eric Dane), an attending in plastic surgery. The couple sustained fatal injuries during an aviation accident in the Season 8 finale, leading to the renaming of Seattle Grace Mercy West Hospital to Grey-Sloan Memorial Hospital in their memory.

Leigh's performance as Lexie Grey received widespread critical acclaim from critics and fans alike. Her death remains one of the most emotional moments in the series' history.

== Storylines ==
=== Background ===
Alexandra Caroline "Lexie" Grey (born 1984) is the daughter of Susan Grey (Mare Winningham) and Thatcher Grey (Jeff Perry), and the older sister of Molly Grey-Thompson (Mandy Siegfried).

Throughout her childhood, Lexie was unaware that she had an older half-sister, Meredith Grey (Ellen Pompeo), who was born to Thatcher and his first wife Ellis Grey (Kate Burton), a world-renowned surgeon. In contrast to Meredith, Lexie grew up in an idealistic and loving home. Meredith once remarked about Lexie: "She was raised right. With parents and rules and smiley face posters on her wall." One of Lexie's fondest memories is of a surprise party her parents threw for her when she turned 7, which she always remembered as one of her best birthdays. Lexie displayed high intelligence from an early age, having skipped third grade and excelled in her psych clerkship. She was also popular during her high school years, where she was crowned prom queen and named class valedictorian. Despite their differences in upbringing, the Grey sisters ultimately form a strong familial bond after Lexie moves into Meredith's house.

Lexie possesses an eidetic memory, a trait that often proves helpful and earns her the nickname "Lexipedia". She demonstrates an aptitude for both plastics and neurosurgery, and is considered one of the most talented young surgeons of her cohort, often being asked to assist on many high-profile surgeries.

=== Season 3 ===
Near the end of Meredith's intern year, Thatcher and Molly mention that Lexie is a student at Harvard Medical School. After she graduates, Lexie is accepted by Massachusetts General Hospital to pursue her residency. However, following her mother's sudden death due to complications from the hiccups, Lexie decides to move back to Seattle to care for her grieving father. She takes up a surgical internship at Seattle Grace Hospital, starting one year behind Meredith, who is about to begin her first year of residency.

On the day of her mother's funeral, Lexie waits in the car while Thatcher, accompanied by Molly, tells Meredith that she isn't welcome at the ceremony, causing Lexie to miss the opportunity to meet her older half-sister. Later that night, before her internship at Seattle Grace begins, Lexie meets Derek Shepherd (Patrick Dempsey) at Joe's Bar, in a scene reminiscent of Derek's initial meeting with Meredith. The two share a flirtatious moment, with Lexie boldly offering to buy Derek a drink, though Derek declines, saying he is there with some friends.

The next day, upon arriving at the hospital's intern locker room, Lexie meets George O'Malley (T. R. Knight), who is at the end of his first year as an intern. After introducing herself, George immediately realizes that Lexie is Meredith's half-sister.

=== Season 4 ===
Lexie quickly befriends George and promises not to reveal that he is repeating his internship after failing his intern exam. Lexie's assigned supervising resident is Cristina Yang (Sandra Oh), Meredith's best friend, who doesn't bother to learn her interns' names and assigns Lexie the nickname "Three". Although Cristina is initially harsh and dismissive, Lexie eventually stands up for herself and earns Cristina's respect. Over time, Cristina even acknowledges Lexie as her best student.

Lexie is eager to build a relationship with Meredith but receives a cold response when she first introduces herself. Despite her efforts to bond, Meredith continuously rebuffs her attempts. Meanwhile, Lexie begins a casual fling with resident Alex Karev (Justin Chambers), who later discovers that her father, Thatcher, has descended into alcoholism following his wife's death and frequently lashes out at Lexie. When Meredith lectures her for not looking after Thatcher, Lexie finally stands up for herself and decides to stop pursuing a relationship with Meredith for the time being.

After ending her emotionless relationship with Alex, Lexie forms a connection with patient Nick Hanscom (Seth Green). She is present when his exposed artery ruptures, causing a massive hemorrhage. Although Lexie manages to stop the bleeding, Nick tragically dies later, leaving Lexie distraught. Sensing her grief, Cristina invites Lexie to join her and Meredith for drinking and dancing, which marks the beginning of the thawing of Lexie and Meredith's relationship.

The next morning, Meredith attempts to show kindness by making Lexie breakfast. Despite being allergic to eggs, Lexie politely eats the meal, only to require treatment later at the hospital. Lexie and George later decide to move in together, but they can only afford a run-down apartment. Lexie attempts to brighten the place by stealing decorations and furniture from the hospital.

As Lexie develops romantic feelings for George, she secretly steals his personnel file from Chief Richard Webber's (James Pickens Jr.) office and learns that George had only failed his intern exam by one point. She encourages him to petition the Chief for a second chance, which the Chief grants. Overjoyed, George plants a casual kiss on Lexie, unaware of her deeper feelings for him.

=== Season 5 ===
Lexie continues to harbor romantic feelings for an oblivious George, reflecting a dynamic similar to George's previous infatuation with an oblivious Meredith. She prioritizes helping George study over taking part in a rare surgery offered to her by plastics attending Mark Sloan (Eric Dane), but feels betrayed when George fails to request that she be assigned as one of his interns after he passes his exam. Realizing George doesn't reciprocate her feelings, Lexie decides to move on, and their friendship gradually fades.

Soon after, Lexie discovers that some of her fellow interns have been secretly practicing medical procedures on each other. To prove herself "hardcore," she participates in these unauthorized operations. When Sadie Harris (Melissa George) suggests that Lexie remove her appendix, Lexie agrees but quickly realizes she's out of her depth and must seek help from Meredith and Cristina to save Sadie's life. This incident results in the interns involved being placed on probation. Exhausted and distraught, Lexie is invited by Derek to move into the attic at his and Meredith's house.

Lexie begins a flirtation with Mark and is impressed by his surgical skills. One night, she goes to his hotel room, boldly undresses, and asks him to "teach" her, marking the start of their romantic relationship. Due to the large age gap and the fact that Lexie is Meredith's younger sister, they initially keep their relationship a secret, earning Lexie the nickname "Little Grey".

When Carolyn, Derek's mother (Tyne Daly) visits, Mark is anxious that she will disapprove of his relationship with Lexie. However, Carolyn gives her approval, telling Mark that Lexie is exactly the kind of youthful person he should be with. In a humorous moment, Lexie accidentally causes Mark to suffer a penile fracture during a makeout session in an on-call room. She seeks the help of Callie Torres (Sara Ramirez) and Owen Hunt (Kevin McKidd) to treat him, and Sadie takes the blame to spare Lexie further embarrassment.

Lexie later wins an intern competition organized by Izzie Stevens (Katherine Heigl) and is congratulated by Mark. Wanting to be open about their relationship, Lexie convinces Mark to confess to Derek, but his timing is poor—Derek, devastated by the loss of a patient, ends up in a fistfight with Mark. The conflict causes Lexie to stress-eat, but the men eventually reconcile.

When Lexie is chosen by Mark to assist with a rare facial transplant surgery, her peers mock her, suggesting she's only involved due to their relationship. In defiance, Lexie kisses Mark in front of the other interns, proclaiming, "They think that we're ugly, but I know that we're beautiful, and we can adapt to a hostile environment."

Lexie is honored when Meredith asks her to be a bridesmaid at her wedding to Derek, though the ceremony is ultimately given to Alex and a cancer-stricken Izzie, which Lexie attends with Mark. When Lexie asks Mark to meet her now-sober father, Thatcher, Mark is initially hesitant, fearing rejection. However, realizing he wants a future with Lexie, he agrees to meet her father.

Shortly after, Mark invites Lexie to move into a house he purchased, but Lexie declines, feeling that their relationship is progressing too quickly.

=== Season 6 ===
Lexie feels immense guilt following George's death, having distanced herself from their friendship after he failed to reciprocate her romantic feelings. She is consoled by Mark and, after becoming a surgical resident, agrees to move into his new apartment with him. The residents face growing stress in the wake of Chief Webber's announcement that Seattle Grace will undergo an administrative merger with Mercy West Hospital, resulting in potential layoffs. Mark encourages Lexie to relax and perform her best, assuring her that she deserves her job. Although Lexie secures her position, many of her friends are cut from the program. To lighten the mood, Owen invites Lexie, Mark, Derek, Meredith, and Cristina for a game of baseball.

Later, Lexie's father, Thatcher, is admitted to the hospital with liver failure due to his past alcoholism. When Lexie learns she cannot be a liver donor, Meredith steps in to save Thatcher, sparing Lexie the grief of losing her father. Following the merger, Lexie clashes with Mercy West resident April Kepner (Sarah Drew), who attempts to undermine her. Lexie retaliates by stealing April's notebook and publicly humiliating her, but later apologizes. When a patient dies due to medical negligence, Webber starts witch hunt to trace back the culprit and identify the cause of death. Lexie is among those questioned, but it is ultimately revealed that April made the error.

Derek enlists Lexie for an unauthorized "rogue surgery" on hospital technician, Isaac's (Faran Tahir) "inoperable" tumor, with Lexie serving as his caregiver during the procedure. Mark supports Lexie, and she resorts to using a diaper to remain in the operating room for the duration of the surgery. Near the end of the year, Lexie and Mark's relationship is tested when Sloan Riley (Leven Rambin), Mark's estranged pregnant daughter, shows up. Mark allows Sloan and her baby to move in, which leads Lexie to break off their relationship, feeling unready to be a grandmother.

A heartbroken and intoxicated Lexie has a one-night stand with Alex, but feels guilty and confesses to Mark, who is furious despite admitting to a similar encounter with Addison Montgomery (Kate Walsh). Lexie suppresses her feelings for Mark and begins a casual relationship with Alex, flaunting it to make Mark jealous. However, she later breaks down in front of Meredith when Alex mentions that Mark is dating Teddy Altman (Kim Raver). After Riley gives her baby up for adoption and leaves Seattle, Mark confesses his love for Lexie, though Lexie hesitantly tells him that Alex is now her boyfriend. Mark replies, "I know. I'm just saying you could have a husband."

Lexie participates in a surgery on Alison Clark (Caroline Williams) and informs her husband Gary (Michael O'Neill) that the procedure was successful, only for Alison to suffer a stroke and fall into a coma. Lexie, following Alison's DNR order, is forced to turn off the life support, leaving Gary devastated. Unable to sue the hospital, Gary returns with a gun, seeking revenge on Derek, Webber, and Lexie. Mark shields Lexie during the shooting as they attempt to save Alex, who is critically wounded.[59] In her search for medical supplies, Lexie comes face-to-face with Gary Clark, but she manages to escape when a SWAT team member wounds him. Lexie and Mark successfully save Alex's life, during which Lexie realizes that Alex is still in love with his ex-wife, Izzie, as he calls for her while on the verge of death. Gary Clark ultimately commits suicide after killing 11 people, wounding 7 more, and causing Meredith to suffer a miscarriage.

=== Season 7 ===
After openly acknowledging the shooting as a mass murder during a therapy session with trauma counselor Andrew Perkins (James Tupper) and the other residents, Lexie experiences a psychotic breakdown stemming from PTSD and sleep deprivation while treating a patient. She is admitted to the hospital's psychiatric ward, where she is sedated for over 50 hours with Meredith remaining by her side. Alex breaks off his relationship with Lexie because he cannot handle the emotional toll of caring for someone with PTSD, and he prefers superficial relationships with women who find his trauma attractive. After recovering and being cleared for surgery, Lexie confronts Alex at Cristina and Owen's wedding, reminding him that she saved his life during the hospital shooting, effectively knocking him down a peg. Lexie becomes frustrated when her colleagues view her as fragile due to her breakdown and works hard to repair her image. She eventually saves a woman from paralysis, earning respect. As her confidence returns, she helps Miranda Bailey (Chandra Wilson) discover a cure for hospital fistula, further solidifying her status as a competent surgeon. Lexie also navigates a growing rivalry with April, but Meredith reassures her that their bond as sisters is irreplaceable.

Lexie and Mark continue to cross paths but struggle to get their timing right, with Lexie acting cold when Mark wants to reconcile, and Mark being caught with casual partners when Lexie considers rekindling their romance. Eventually, they both acknowledge their lingering feelings and resume their relationship. Lexie almost suffers another breakdown when victims of a school shooting are brought to the hospital, triggering memories of her own traumatic experience during the hospital shooting. Mark comforts her, and after they successfully treat the victims, Lexie tells him that she loves him. However, their relationship is tested again when Lexie learns that during their breakup, Mark unintentionally impregnated Callie Torres (Sara Ramirez). Feeling unprepared for parenthood, Lexie ends their relationship once more.

Lexie is further upset when her father, Thatcher, is admitted to the hospital with kidney stones, and she discovers he is dating a 20-year-old. Worried about her, Mark enlists his protégé Jackson Avery (Jesse Williams) to find out what's bothering her. Lexie confides in Jackson that she is frustrated with the people in her life, especially Mark and her father, making life-changing decisions without considering her feelings. After overhearing Mark say he will care for his and Callie's child no matter the circumstances, Lexie regrets not allowing him to explain the situation before walking away. However, Jackson convinces her that nobody has just one soulmate, and they begin dating.

Mark is furious and heartbroken when he finds out about Lexie and Jackson's relationship and desperately tries to win her back. But when Callie is severely injured in a car accident, Lexie is there to console Mark. After Callie's baby is born, Mark tells Lexie that she is the only thing missing from his life to make it perfect. Lexie, while expressing that she will always love Mark, decides that they have different desires in life and will never be compatible. She urges Mark to move on and gives her relationship with Jackson a fresh start, with Mark finally giving them his blessing.

=== Season 8 ===
Although initially content in her relationship with Jackson, Lexie becomes increasingly distraught when she discovers that Mark has started dating an ophthalmologist named Julia Canner (Holley Fain). Lexie's jealousy flares during a charity softball match, where she throws a ball at Julia, injuring her chest after seeing them flirt. Sensing that Lexie is still in love with Mark, Jackson ends their relationship. Lexie then begins working under Derek's service, becoming increasingly skilled in neurosurgery. She assists Derek with a set of "hopeless cases"—high-risk surgeries for patients with no other options. In one surgery, Derek is called away, leaving Lexie and Meredith to complete the procedure. Despite instructions to only reduce the patient's brain tumor, Meredith encourages Lexie to remove it entirely. Although the surgery is initially celebrated as a success, the patient suffers severe brain damage, losing their ability to speak, leaving Lexie devastated.

Meanwhile, Alex, Jackson, and April move out of Meredith's house without inviting Lexie, and with Derek and Meredith settling down with baby Zola, Lexie begins to feel lonely and isolated. Left babysitting Zola on Valentine's Day, Lexie considers confessing her love to Mark. However, when she arrives at his apartment and finds him studying with Jackson, she loses her nerve, pretending she wanted to set up a playdate instead. When Mark confides in Derek about possibly moving in with Julia, Derek warns Lexie not to miss her chance again. She then professes her love to Mark, who, shell-shocked, merely thanks her for her candor. Later, Mark admits to Derek that he feels the same way but is unsure how to proceed.

Shortly after, Lexie is assigned to a team of surgeons headed to Boise, Idaho to separate conjoined twins, along with Mark, Meredith, Derek, Cristina, and Arizona Robbins (Jessica Capshaw). During the flight, the plane crashes in the wilderness, and Lexie is pinned under debris. Despite Mark and Cristina's efforts to save her, Lexie realizes she has sustained a fatal injury, suffering from a hemothorax. While Cristina searches for supplies, Mark stays by Lexie's side, holding her hand and professing his love, envisioning a future together with marriage and children, believing they are "meant to be". Tragically, Lexie succumbs to her injuries while fantasizing about the life they could have had, dying just moments before Meredith arrives. The remaining doctors are left stranded in the woods, with a devastated Meredith grieving and Mark refusing to let go of Lexie's hand.

=== Season 9 onwards ===
In season 9, the remaining surgeons are rescued from the wilderness days later and Lexie's body is returned to Seattle. Still devastated by Lexie's passing, Mark advises his protégé Jackson, 'when you love someone, tell them', which Mark feels he did not tell Lexie enough when she was alive. Mark subsequently makes a clean break with Julia, stating that he had always only truly loved Lexie. Mark is soon placed on life support due to the extensive internal injuries he sustained during the plane crash and, as determined by his will, the machines keeping him alive are turned off as he shows no signs of waking after 30 days. Following Mark's death, flashbacks of several moments in his life show him being videotaped at Callie and Arizona's wedding; at the end of his congratulatory speech, Mark declares that Lexie was the one, true partner he wanted to grow old and dance with at their granddaughter's wedding. When the remaining survivors of the plane crash pool their compensation money to purchase Seattle Grace Mercy West, they agree to rename it "Grey Sloan Memorial Hospital" in tribute to Lexie and Mark.

In season 15, Lexie's spirit appears alongside the ghosts of Mark, Derek, George, Doc and Ellis as they watch Meredith leave the hospital after treating a patient whose family celebrates the Day of the Dead.

In season 17, Lexie and Mark visit Meredith in a vision while she is on a ventilator, convincing her that life and all of its aspects are worth living.

== Development ==
=== Casting and creation ===
It was like coming into somebody else's group or circle—it was a little daunting in the beginning. But I have had such a great time.

— Leigh on her early days at Grey's Anatomy

Chyler Leigh first appeared on Grey's Anatomy in the last two episodes of Season 3 as Meredith's half-sister, Lexie Grey. Following Isaiah Washington's departure, who portrayed Preston Burke, it was reported that the show's executives were planning on adding new cast members, including Lexie. Leigh was officially upgraded to a series regular on July 11, 2007, for the fourth season. On casting Leigh as Lexie, Grey's Anatomy creator Shonda Rhimes said: "We met with a lot of young actresses, but Chyler stood out—she had a quality that felt right and real to me. It felt like she could be Meredith's sister, but she had a depth that was very interesting."

In September 2011, Leigh requested an extended summer hiatus to spend more time with her family, which was granted by Rhimes. The actress returned full-time in mid-October. Leigh also reprised her role for two guest appearances on the spin-off show Private Practice in 2012. That same year, Leigh's character died in the Season 8 finale of Grey's Anatomy. Rhimes commented on the decision: "I love Chyler and I love the character of Lexie Grey. She was an important member of my Grey's family. This was not an easy decision. But it was a decision that Chyler and I came to together. We had a lot of thoughtful discussion about it and ultimately we both decided this was the right time for her character's journey to end. As far as I'm concerned, Chyler will always remain a part of the Shondaland family, and I can't wait to work with her again in the future." Following the death of her character, Leigh released a statement saying:

Earlier this year, I made the decision that season eight would be my last on Grey's Anatomy. I met with Shonda [Rhimes] and we worked together to give Lexie's story appropriate closure. I am very lucky to have worked with this amazing cast and crew for five seasons. My experience on Grey's Anatomy is something that I will treasure for the rest of my life. I want to take this time to say thank you to the fans. Your unconditional love and support have made these last five years very special for me. I look forward to my next chapter and I hope you will continue to follow me on my journey.

=== Characterization ===
Lexie Grey is here now. And she's here to stay. I love that she's a bit of a dork. Being a dork myself, I am fond of the girls with verbal diarrhea. Because it's not easy to keep all your words in – believe me.

— Rhimes on Lexie's personality

Leigh's character has been described by Grey's Anatomy executives as "reliable, trustworthy, timid, and apprehensive". In her early appearances, it was revealed that Lexie has an eidetic memory, which she applied to her surgical career. This talent earned her the nickname "Lexipedia" from Alex Karev (Justin Chambers). Alex Keen of The Trades referred to Lexie as an "innocent young intern".

Regarding her character, Leigh commented: "She's a very vulnerable person from a very healthy background—she knows how to make good relationships, but at this point [Season 4], she's coming into so much opposition she's trying to adjust to it." Debbie Chang of BuddyTV commented on Lexie's early characterization, including her sexual relationship with Karev:

Rivaling her half-sister Meredith with her own set of daddy issues, Lexie has been perfectly on schedule with the boyfriend issues this season as well. She decided that she could live with being Alex's plaything, no strings attached, but when push came to shove, and [Karev's ex-girlfriend] came back for a booty call or two, she showed her true Grey colors and couldn't continue with the emotionless sex. She has, however, made considerable strides in her relationship with Meredith.

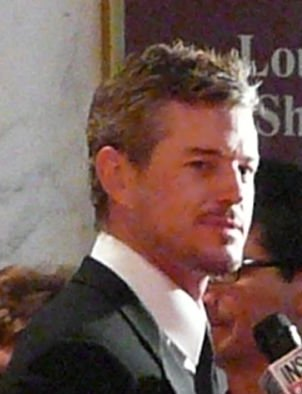
The relationship between Leigh's character and Eric Dane's Mark Sloan has been lauded by critics and fans of the show.

Similarities have been established between Lexie and Meredith. Series writer, Stacy McKee, commented on this:

Lexie's struggling to be hardcore herself. I don't know if I'd go so far as to say, perhaps, this kind of struggle must run in the family, but... Okay. Fine. It must run in the family – because Lexie, though she's very different from Meredith in many many ways, in this one way – they seem to be exactly alike. Meredith and Lexie both want to succeed. They want to be strong. They want to feel normal. They want, so much, to be whole. But it's a struggle – a genuine struggle for them. Being hardcore doesn't come naturally. Sometimes, they have to fake it.

— Stacy McKee, Grey Matter

Lexie entertained several relationships throughout her time on Grey's Anatomy. In her early appearances, she maintained a strong friendship with George O'Malley (T. R. Knight) until she began developing romantic feelings for him. Series creator Rhimes offered the insight: "I love them as friends. They make good friends. We all have that friend we met in school or the gym or somewhere – we just hit it off right away. And right away there was no pretense or airs. Just pure honesty. That's Lexie and George. They're really good friends, and I can see the friendship evolving into something even greater. At least, that's what Lexie is hoping. She is my kind of girl. The girl who likes the guy because he is a GOOD guy, and that's what George is. He is a good guy, and that's something that Lexie could use now. She's going through her own challenges, what with Meredith and losing her own mother and trying to keep things afloat. I'm rooting for Lexie. She's my kind of girl, and I hope that she gets what she deserves: love. And more kisses. There should always be that."

Lexie's most significant relationship on the show was with Mark Sloan (Eric Dane). Following the couple's deaths, Rhimes mused, "[Mark] and Lexie get to be together in a way. Their love remains true," adding:

Honestly, I always felt like Mark and Lexie were meant to be together. If things had not turned out the way they had this season, I had a completely different thing planned for them. I was one of the people who loved Mark and Lexie together. ... When Mark and Lexie say "meant to be," it wasn't about servicing the fans. That's how I felt. That's what was supposed to happen, and that's what I wanted to see. It was heartbreaking. I loved the idea of them together. They played really well together. They were very charming and funny and great. We did the scene where Lexie confesses to Mark that she's still in love with him. That was bittersweet to me because it was like, 'Look, they're so close, so close! And yet so far.'

== Reception ==
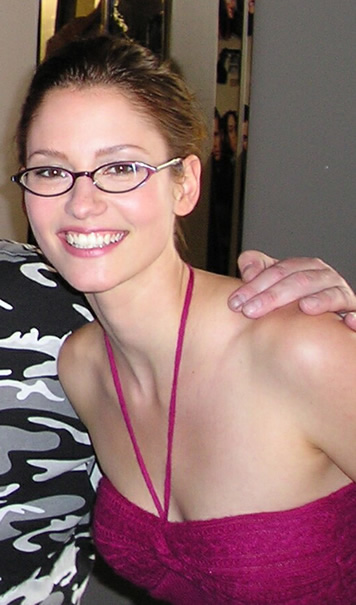
Both the character of Lexie Grey and Chyler Leigh's performance have garnered positive feedback and acclaim from critics and fans

While reception to Lexie Grey was initially mixed, both the character and Chyler Leigh's performance garnered positive feedback and acclaim as her role on the series progressed, and Lexie soon became a favorite of critics and fans of the show. Eileen Lulevitch, an entertainment reviewer for TV Guide, praised Lexie's introduction in Season 4. Former The Star-Ledger columnist Alan Sepinwall was also favorable of Lexie's arrival at Seattle Grace, feeling that "she's still being written as Meredith circa season one in an attempt to make us like her, but I didn't mind the manipulation, if only because there are so few characters left on this show to like." Buzzsugar also praised Lexie's introduction in the series. On the other hand, People Magazine was initially less than impressed with Lexie and criticized the way Leigh's character first approached her sister, calling it "rude". Laura Burrows from IGN wrote: "Everything she says and does is obnoxious and does harm to someone. Lexie is an idiot and should be shot or drowned or exploded". Jennifer Armstrong of Entertainment Weekly was also critical of Leigh's early appearances, referring to her as "awkward". However, Armstrong later noted that the "sparkling" friendship development between Lexie and George O'Malley (T. R. Knight) "won her over".

The character's transition from Seasons 4 to 5 was positively reviewed, with Alex Keen of The Trades writing: "Her presence and confidence have increased quite a bit since last season, and actress Chyler Leigh does a fantastic job of making this progression feel seamless. Since the series has defused the tension between Little Grey and Big Grey (aka Meredith), Lexie has clear sailing through the season and steals the show as one of the best current characters on the series." The character's romantic relationship with Eric Dane's Mark Sloan has been acclaimed, with Chris Monfette of IGN writing: "Sloan's honest relationship with Lexie helped to make both characters infinitely more interesting and mature". BuddyTV lauded the development and progression of Lexie and Mark's relationship throughout Season 5, saying, "They are beautiful, and they can adapt to a hostile environment". HuffPost's Michael Pascua praised Leigh's performance and Lexie's evolution in Season 6, writing that he enjoyed Lexie's "humorous" and "emotionally connective" role as a "genuine character" during the merger and layoffs, commenting: "She still maintained that book-smart ability to repeat facts (like the merger cases) and shows a command of medical situations... She shouldn't be worried about the merger because she's a good doctor." TV Guide's Adam Bryant praised Leigh's "powerful performance" in Season 6, writing: "The bond that is growing between Lexie and Meredith is nice to see. From Meredith finally saying out loud how she feels about Lexie, to Lexie being at Mer's side when she wakes up, I am really glad to see these sisters' happy." Lexie's storyline in Season 6 was also praised by PopSugar. Leigh served as a primary vocalist in Season 7's musical episode, "Song Beneath the Song", and received rave reviews from television critics, including the Boston Herald's Mark Perigard. Leigh's performance in the Season 8 finale, which was also her character's final appearance, was deemed as "phenomenal" by Digital Spy's Ben Lee.

Lexie Grey was listed in Wetpaint's "10 Hottest Female Doctors on TV".

== Awards ==
In 2008, Leigh was a part of the ensemble cast that was nominated for the Screen Actors Guild Award for Outstanding Performance by an Ensemble in a Drama Series.
