= April Kepner =

Fictional character from Grey's Anatomy

- Grey's Anatomy character
- Sarah Drew as Dr. April Kepner
- First appearance: "Invasion" (6.05); October 15, 2009 (as recurring cast) "With You I'm Born Again" (7.01); September 23, 2010 (as main cast)
- Last appearance: "All of Me" (14.24); May 17, 2018 (as main cast) "You Are the Blood" (18.20); May 26, 2022 (as guest cast)
- Created by: Shonda Rhimes
- Portrayed by: Sarah Drew

In-universe information
- Full name: April Kepner
- Nicknames: Virgin Mary; Apes; Ducky; Shepherd's flunkey; Dud; Keps; The Machine; The Party; Dr. Not Grey
- Title(s): M.D. F.A.C.S. Captain
- Occupation: Attending trauma surgeon (former); Interim Chief of General Surgery (former); Chief Resident (former); Trauma surgeon for the United States Army (former)
- Family: Joe Kepner (father); Karen Kepner (mother); Libby Kepner (sister); Kimmie Kepner (sister); Alice Kepner (sister)
- Spouses: Jackson Avery (m. 2013; div. 2016; reconciled); Matthew Taylor (m. (2018; div. 2020)
- Significant others: Tom Koracick (one night stand); Vikram Roy (ex-affair)
- Children: Samuel Norbert Avery (deceased); Harriet Kepner-Avery
- Religion: Christianity
- Born: 1982

April Kepner, M.D., F.A.C.S. is a fictional character from the ABC's medical drama series Grey's Anatomy. The character was created by series producer Shonda Rhimes and is portrayed by actress Sarah Drew. April was introduced in the episode "Invasion" as a surgical resident from Mercy West Medical Center who joins the staff at Seattle Grace Mercy West following the merger of the two hospitals. This was done to compensate for the absence of some central cast members, and April was originally created to be somewhat disliked by her colleagues. Although initially set to appear in just two episodes, Drew's contract was extended for the remainder of Season 6, and she became a series regular in Season 7.

April's primary storylines revolve around her professional struggles and religious beliefs. She eventually marries Jackson Avery (Jesse Williams) and together, they have two children: a son, Samuel, who dies from osteogenesis imperfecta type II, and a daughter named Harriet. April's story concluded with her departure in the Season 14 finale, and it was later revealed in Season 17 that she left Seattle with Jackson to run the Catherine Fox Foundation.

Initially, April focused on neurosurgery during her residency due to a crush on Derek Shepherd (Patrick Dempsey), but she ultimately found her true passion in trauma surgery. After failing her medical boards, April briefly leaves the hospital but later returns as a surgical attending when Chief Owen Hunt (Kevin McKidd) offers her job back. ABC characterized her as determined, thorough, and intelligent, while also noting her insecurity, over-eagerness, and vulnerability as her main weaknesses.

The character received mixed reviews from critics early on, with some finding her irritating due to her insecurity and overzealous nature. However, as April evolved and her storylines deepened, she gained significant character growth, and many fans began to appreciate her journey, eventually becoming a fan-favorite.

== Storylines ==
April Kepner was born in Columbus, Ohio. Her mother Karen is a teacher, and her father Joe is a farmer, and she is the second of four daughters. Kepner is initially a surgical resident at Mercy West Medical Center. She joins the staff at Seattle Grace Mercy West after the merger of the two hospitals, alongside Jackson Avery (Jesse Williams), Reed Adamson (Nora Zehetner), and Charles Percy (Robert Baker). April is first shown to possess a red diary, in which she writes all her feelings and thoughts which is stolen by Lexie Grey (Chyler Leigh). Lexie uses the personal information written in the notebook to unnerve and blackmail Kepner but later apologizes. After she made a mistake that led to a patient's death, she is fired. However, Derek Shepherd (Patrick Dempsey) rehires her when he becomes the new Chief of Surgery. As she is not confident anymore, she spends her time doing errands for Shepherd and develops a crush on him, earning her the nickname "Shepherd's flunky". In the Season 6 finale, she discovers the body of her best friend Reed, who has been shot. She later runs into the shooter, Gary Clark, who spares her after she tells him about her life. Following the shooting, April and fellow resident Jackson Avery move into Meredith Grey's (Ellen Pompeo) house.

April reveals that she is a virgin because she is a Christian and made a promise to God to stay a virgin until she was married. She shows potential as a trauma surgeon during a trauma drill. She develops feelings for Alex Karev (Justin Chambers) who almost makes her lose her virginity. When Jackson, now her best friend finds out about this, he assaults Alex. Later, April agrees to go on a date with Robert Stark, believing him to have a good side. Her fellow residents make fun of her which prompts her to break up with him. April also impresses Owen Hunt (Kevin McKidd) and she is ultimately granted the position of Chief Resident in the Season 7 finale. Many become upset with Owen's decision. April initially struggles with her new status as her fellow doctors do not listen to her and do not take her seriously.

As the end of the fifth year of residency is near, the surgical residents, including April, prepare for their boards exams for the different fellowships they plan on joining. The night before taking the exam, April loses her virginity to Jackson which causes her to re-evaluate her faith during her Boards Exams, making the examiners feel uncomfortable. It is revealed that she is the only one out of the residents to have failed her Boards Exams. She receives phone calls from other hospital retracting their offers of fellowships and is laid off from Seattle Grace. Although Jackson has true feelings for her, April pushes him away because she believes that he feels guilty for having sex with her. As a celebration of the conclusion of their residencies, the former chief of surgery Richard Webber (James Pickens, Jr.) organizes his annual dinner for them. The eighth season ends with April, Jackson, Alex, and Richard waiting for Meredith and Cristina, who are victims of an aviation accident.

In Season 9, months later, Owen goes to visit April, who had moved back to her parents' farm in Moline, Ohio. In the wake of the aviation accident, he offers her an attending position at the hospital. When she gets back to Seattle Grace, she resumes her sexual relationship with Jackson, despite claiming she wants to re-virginise. April has a pregnancy scare and Jackson promises that he will be there every step of the way, even marry her, if she tests positive. When April finds out that she is not pregnant, she is overjoyed, but inadvertently hurts Jackson's feelings by saying that they dodged a bullet, seemingly thrilled that they do not have to get married anymore. Jackson breaks up with April. April suggests to Jackson that they each take a date to Bailey's wedding in an attempt to move on. Jackson takes intern Stephanie; the two bond and eventually have sex. When Jackson tells April that he is sleeping with somebody else, she is visibly crushed and tells him that they cannot be friends again until she has gotten over him. In the next episode, an attractive paramedic named Matthew (Justin Bruening) asks April out for coffee and they start seeing each other. Shortly afterwards she turns to Jackson for dating advice and it is hinted that Jackson is still in love with her when he shows signs of jealousy but they re-establish their friendship. She confesses to Matthew that she is not a virgin anymore as she led him to believe and he breaks up with her because she lied to him. However, in the next episode, Matthew forgives April and they get back together. He asks her to marry him through a flash mob and she says yes. In the season 9 finale, April thinks she lost Jackson when a bus blew up and tells him she loves him, but he only has a few injuries.

In Season 10, April is still engaged to Matthew while Jackson dates Stephanie. At the wedding, Jackson realizes he still loves April and stands up professing his love. Jackson and April are seen driving off together at the start of the following episode and later, it is revealed that they have secretly gotten married after they ran off together. At first, April and Jackson do not tell their friends about their marriage, but later they do because of a new rule at the hospital. Catherine Avery is not at all happy about her son's elopement with April, and the fact that there was not a prenuptial agreement. They soon make up after April signs a postnuptial agreement.

In Season 11, Jackson and April hit a rough patch when they realize that they have different views in the way their children should be raised religious. Not long after their fight, April realizes she is pregnant. April and Jackson's baby is diagnosed during pregnancy with a sickness that causes the babies bones to break, which is called Osteogenesis Imperfecta type II, and learn that the baby will not survive long after birth. Jackson believes that termination is the best option, however April would rather give birth to the baby knowing it will not live very long. They scheduled an induction for the next day, at the beginning of the appointment they are asked to sign their baby's death certificate, which is too hard for the couple to bear. April does not sign the papers and returns to work the same day, praying for a miracle. They decide to give birth to the baby via induction at 24 weeks gestation having it baptized right then. She gives birth to a boy, named Samuel Norbert Avery, and he died a few hours after birth because of his sickness. In the following weeks after Samuel's death, April and Jackson find it hard to be around each other and be intimate with one another. After April tries to seduce Jackson in a supply closet, Jackson asks if she is sure she wants this so soon after the death of their son, leaving April to storm out in anger. In the season 11 finale, April decides to join Owen Hunt for three months as a trauma surgeon with the army; this not being well received by Jackson. But after April states she needs this in order to grieve Samuel, Jackson lets her leave. Over the following months, April lengthens her stay in the army, this having a strain on her and Jackson's marriage as Jackson can rarely get a hold of her. On Christmas Day after already being away for some time, April announces to Jackson while on video chat that she is staying for a longer service period, but the conversation is cut short by sounds of gunfire and explosions from April's base camp, leaving her to terminate the call; meanwhile Jackson is unsure whether his wife is hurt. On Valentine's Day, April returns to the hospital surprising Jackson, and they embrace in the foyer.

In Season 12, April and Jackson go through divorce proceedings that Jackson started. The morning before they sign the divorce papers, April discovers that she is expecting a second baby. She does not inform Jackson, and he is told by Arizona Robbins (Jessica Capshaw), which leads to additional tension. After Catherine Avery convinces Jackson to fight for full custody of his unborn child, April takes out a restraining order against him. The Averys' lawyer asks for all documentation of their marriage and Jackson realizes they should fix the situation for their child. He and April decide to raise their child together as friends. Complications arise when April needs a C-section and Warren has to do it, without anesthesia or other medications.

In seasons 13 and 14, April faces a crisis of faith as she believes that good people get punished and bad people get good things. She does this after treating 3 seemingly simple patients who are good people and die, including Matthew's pregnant wife, after delivery. Robbins then tells April it's her fault. As a result, she goes into a dark place and uses partying and sex to mask her deep-rooted pain. She earns the nickname "The Party" by the new interns. She refuses to let Jackson help her through this time. However, in mid-season 14, she encounters a terminal patient who helps April reaffirm her faith. April starts seeing Matthew again and their relationship is made public when the two are involved in a car accident, where April almost dies of hypothermia; when April finally wakes up from her coma after Jackson prays for her, her friends are relieved. In the season finale, April and Matthew get married. She resigns from the hospital to provide much-needed medical care for the homeless communities in Seattle, something she and Matthew had been doing together voluntarily.

In Season 17, it is revealed that April has separated from Matthew. When Jackson decides to resign from the hospital and take over the Catherine Fox Foundation, April decides to go with him and Harriet, and the three of them depart Seattle for Boston. In the following season, she and Jackson visit Seattle and it is revealed that the two of them have reconciled.

== Development ==
=== Casting and creation ===
I think it's a really fun character and, of course, getting to be on that show is wonderful and exciting for any actress in Hollywood.

— Drew on her role in Grey's Anatomy.

Drew was cast in Grey's Anatomy in late September 2009, first appearing in the fifth episode of the sixth season as April Kepner, one of the residents from Mercy West Medical Center after its merger with Seattle Grace. Drew had previously collaborated with the series' producer and creator Shonda Rhimes, having guest-starred in two episodes of Private Practice in 2008 and starring in Rhimes' television pilot Inside the Box (2009), which was ultimately not picked up by ABC. Her casting came after notable absences of central cast members, including Katherine Heigl who departed the show after her maternity leave, and Ellen Pompeo, who was absent due to pregnancy.

Initially, Drew was contracted to guest-star in a multi-episode arc, with her character expected to be fired after just two episodes. Drew explained: "I came on to the show and I was told from day one that I was only going to be there for two episodes. I did not expect anything beyond that. The morning my firing episode aired, my agent got a call that they were talking about a contract, and I was just completely floored." However, she was later promoted to a series regular on June 9, 2010, for the show's seventh season. Rhimes expressed enthusiasm for the decision, stating: "Kepner has really been folded into the group" and hinted that her future on the show would depend on the studio and network's decisions, but she fully supported keeping the character. Drew received the promotion news after the sixth episode of Season 6, "I Saw What I Saw", aired on October 29, 2009, describing the call as a "totally happy surprise".

=== Characterization ===
I love the idea that there's this person that everybody kind of hates, yet they all have to deal with, [and even] lean on. She is one of them, even though they find her terribly annoying, and I think that that's sort of charming.

April has been described by Grey's Anatomy executives as intelligent, hardworking, thorough, and determined. However, her colleagues view her as vulnerable, insecure, sensitive, and overly eager. Drew herself noted that: "April is a very, very good doctor. She really knows what she's doing, she's worked really hard, and she certainly wants to do her best and stick around." Despite her professionalism, Drew also described Kepner as "annoying", "neurotic", and "really insecure".

In Season 8, April's storyline centered around her role as chief resident and her struggle to manage her fellow residents. Series creator Shonda Rhimes elaborated: "Watching April try to be in charge of Cristina and Alex and Jackson is a pretty impossible task, and it's made for comedy. It's one of the funniest things we're working on this season."

One of Kepner's defining traits is her strong religious beliefs, particularly her commitment to chastity and waiting for true love. In an interview, Drew reflected on this aspect of her character: "There certainly has never been a 28-year-old virgin on Grey's. I don't even think there's been a 28-year-old virgin on television. Unless it's someone who is sort of a recluse. A normal, smart, doctor... pretty, healthy... that in and of itself is really fascinating, and really interesting, and totally different." Drew emphasized how April's innocence sets her apart, stating: "April's really pretty much done nothing. She's completely untouched."

=== Relationships ===
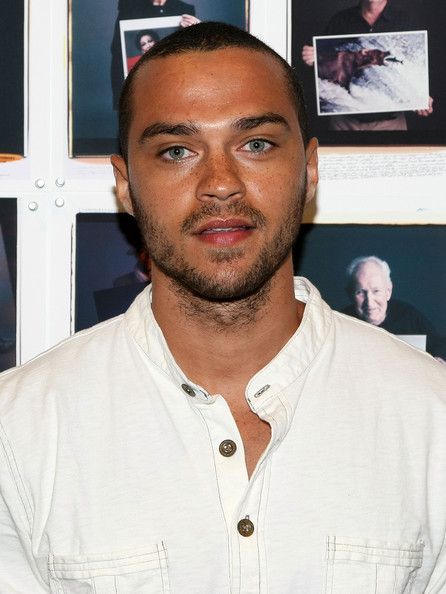
April and Jackson (Jesse Williams)'s sexual encounter makes her re-evaluate her faith and jeopardizes the course of her career.

April had several relationships throughout her time on Grey's Anatomy. Early in her appearances, she is introduced as the best friend and roommate of fellow Mercy West resident, Reed Adamson (Nora Zehetner). In the Season 6 finale, when Reed is murdered by Gary Clark during the hospital shooting, April is the first to find her, tripping over her dead body. This event significantly impacts April's journey as a character.

April develops a crush on Derek Shepherd (Patrick Dempsey) in Season 6. Carina MacKenzie of The Los Angeles Times called it "ridiculous", adding: "April is drooling all over Chief McDreamy. She's been reduced to a 12-year-old with hearts in her eyes and a painful inability to be subtle." Drew herself was skeptical of the storyline, stating: "The biggest thing that people did not like about my character was they thought I was a threat for the Mer/Der relationship, which I kind of found was super ridiculous ... I only saw it as a really pathetic little crush."

In Season 7, April forms a friendship with Meredith Grey (Ellen Pompeo), eventually moving into her house. Pompeo noted about their bond: "Meredith will accept April in order to get the audience to accept her", while Drew explained: "She's being plugged into the community. Meredith has really taken her under her wing, is really looking out for her. Having Meredith come around to April helps the audience come around to April."

April briefly has feelings for Alex Karev (Justin Chambers), and almost loses her virginity to him in the Season 7 episode "Something's Gotta Give". Wetpaint commented that Alex made her feel "worthless and unwanted when she was at her most vulnerable". She also dates Dr. Robert Stark (Peter MacNicol), a senior pediatric surgical attending. After her fellow residents mock her, she breaks up with him, creating tension between them. However, Stark later recommends her for chief resident to Dr. Owen Hunt (Kevin McKidd). Drew remarked: "She sees a side to Dr. Stark that he doesn't show to anyone else at the hospital, and she finds that part endearing... I think they enjoy the companionship."

At the end of Season 8, Kepner begins a romantic relationship with her best friend, Jackson Avery (Jesse Williams), and loses her virginity to him. This causes her to reflect on her faith and ultimately leads to her failing her boards. Critics praised the chemistry between April and Jackson. Rhimes commented on their dynamic in Season 9, saying: "I think it's going to be funny, sexy, and good."

== Reception ==
Initially, Carina MacKenzie of the Los Angeles Times highly praised the characterization of April Kepner, writing: "One of my favorite Mercy Westers is intern April (Sarah Drew). Her saccharine-sweet attitude and wide-eyed insincerity were hilarious, as was her super-mysterious hot pink notebook full of morale-boosting platitudes." However, she criticized the later development of her storyline, particularly her crush on Derek Shepherd, calling it "vomit". PopSugar noted similarities between Kepner and Lexie Grey, stating: "Am I the only one who thinks the new doctor is kind of like Lexie 2.0? Their dynamic reminded me of when Lexie first started and tries really hard to make nice with Mere, but gets the cold shoulder in return." Mariella Mosthof from Wetpaint stated: "Despite her obnoxious yet well-meaning tendencies, we briefly flirted with the idea of liking April's character last season, and it looks like there's plenty of opportunity for her to come back and charm us again this time around." Reviewing the first part of the eighth season, Courtney Morrison of TV Fanatic wrote: "Although the girl has grown in terms of likeability, her downfalls still outweigh the positives. She wasn't the best choice for Chief Resident; she doesn't seem to be on the same level surgically and hasn't carried a story on her own that makes us care about her."

Kepner was included in TV Guide's list of The Most Loathed TV Characters, noting: "The extremely neurotic April (she makes Liz Lemon look laid back) has slowly made strides with fans thanks to her personal setbacks—she lost her treasured virginity to her best friend and failed her boards—but she still has a long way to go." Entertainment Weekly also named her one of the "21 Most Annoying TV Characters Ever", commenting: "April's lightened up a little this season [season 9], but a few episodes of sympathetic behavior can't erase the painful memories of Seattle Grace-Mercy West's most irritating doctor being." TV Fanatic included her in their list of Worst Characters on TV, where Christina Tran commented: "Could she be any more annoying?!?" Sarah Drew stated that it was initially "hard" for her as an actress to play an unpopular character but deemed her "interesting." When she was informed by the writers that her character would get Dr. Shepherd (Patrick Dempsey) shot in the season six finale, her reaction was: "Oh, come on, guys, really? They already hate my character, now they're going to hate her even more!"

However, critics' reception gradually improved. Entertainment Weekly noted: "April was chirpy, irritating, and immature, and her crush on Derek didn't endear her to us either. But these days, we say hooray for April; since Meredith declared that the two of them are pals, April's become a lot more tolerable, instead of being Lexie 2.0." Courtney Morrison of TV Fanatic wrote: "April has grown since her character was introduced. She's no longer much less annoying than she used to be, and she's honest. A girl with principles is a girl you want to do well." She also described her and Jackson as "a couple for whom viewers can root". The Hollywood Reporter also remarked: "It's nice to see April with a bit of a backbone and putting Alex in his place, as the newfound confidence suits her well."
