= Zuberi Williams =

American judge

Associate Judge of the Maryland District Court
- Incumbent
- Assumed office January 6, 2015
- Nominated by: Martin O'Malley
- Preceded by: Karla N. Smith

Personal details
- Born: December 1, 1978 (age 47) Washington, D.C., U.S.
- Education: Texas Christian University (BBA); American University (JD, MBA)

Zuberi Bakari Williams (born December 1, 1978) is an American attorney and jurist serving as an associate judge of the District Court of Maryland, for Montgomery County. He was appointed by former Governor Martin O'Malley in December 2014. He was later confirmed by the Maryland Senate and sworn in on January 6, 2015. At the age of 36, Williams became one of the youngest judges to be appointed in Maryland history.

== Early life and education ==
Zuberi Bakari Williams was born at Howard University Hospital, Washington, DC. Williams's father was raised in inner city Chicago, Illinois, and his mother immigrated to the United States from Guyana. His parents, both public school teachers, settled in Southern Maryland, where they lived for 38 years. He has two sisters.

Williams attended La Plata High School in La Plata, Maryland. There, he lettered in four sports: Cross-Country, Track and Field (indoor and outdoor), and wrestling. He also was elected class president. Williams was selected by the Charles County Board of Education to page at the Maryland General Assembly. He served as a page for State Senator Thomas Mike Miller. During his junior year, Williams' essay won the McDonald's Black History Makers of Tomorrow contest for the Washington metropolitan area. His piece on his desire to practice civil rights law earned him college scholarship money and stock in both McDonald's and Coca-Cola.

Williams attended Texas Christian University (TCU) in Fort Worth, Texas, on an academic scholarship and diversity grant. While at TCU, Williams earned a Bachelor of Business Administration and marketing degree from Neeley School of Business. On campus, Williams served on the Student Government Association as parliamentarian, participated in the Black Student Caucus and the TCU Student Foundation, and interned for TCU's athletic department. He received a minor in Spanish culture and language from TCU, for which he briefly lived with a family in Guadalajara, Mexico to study Spanish and Latin dance. Williams was a speaker during college, giving speeches on behalf of his alma mater. Williams was also an avid ultimate frisbee player and was a member of TCU's Ultimate Frisbee travel team.

In 2000, Williams began attending Washington College of Law for the joint JD/MBA program. Williams worked for the Administrative Law Review and a student attorney with the Glushko-Samuelson Intellectual Property Law Clinic. He also was a member of the Black Law Students Association (BLSA) and Business Law Society. During his final year, Williams won the Edward J. Walker Clinical Scholarship Award. He was also appointed to the Admissions Selection Committee. Williams was elected by his peers to deliver the 2003 WCL Commencement Address. Williams was named to the WCL Dean's Diversity Council. In 2005, Williams earned a Master of Business Administration (MBA) degree from American University's Kogod School of Business.

== Career ==
=== Early career ===
After law school, Williams worked a clerkship with Robert M. Bell, Chief Judge of Maryland's highest court, Maryland Court of Appeals, and the first African-American Chief Judge in Maryland history.

In 2004, Williams joined Venable LLP, where he was a member of the White Collar Crime practice group. In 2005, Williams pursued a federal clerkship with United States District Court Judge Gerald Bruce Lee at the Eastern District of Virginia (Alexandria). Judge Lee had 2 clerks in his chambers that term: (1) Judge Williams, who reached the bench at age 36 and (2) Justin Fairfax, who was elected Lieutenant Governor of Virginia in 2017 at the age of 38.

In 2007, Williams was sworn in as an assistant Attorney General for the District of Columbia, where he tried cases involving employment discrimination, personal injury, false arrest, police assault, inmate assaults, and whistleblower claims in both federal and state courts.

=== Administrative law judge ===
In 2010, Judge Williams was appointed as an administrative law judge in the Maryland Office of Administrative Hearings. There, he presided over hundreds of cases including those concerning DUIs, child abuse and neglect, conditional release, involuntary admission to mental facilities, and wrongful employment termination.

=== District court judge ===
On December 30, 2014, Governor Martin O'Malley announced the appointment of Williams to the District Court in Montgomery County, Maryland. At the age of 36, Williams became one of the youngest judges to be appointed in Maryland history. He was later confirmed by the Maryland State Senate and sworn in on January 6, 2015.

In 2016, he was appointed as chair of the District Court Alternative Dispute Resolution (ADR). He was also invited to be a contributing participant in the Maryland General Assembly legislative initiative called the Justice Reinvestment Act, legislation addressing criminal justice reform in Maryland history.

In 2017, Williams was appointed to the Judicial Compensation Committee. In 2019, Williams was also appointed to the Equal Justice Committee.

== Personal life ==
Williams lives with his wife and children in Montgomery County, Maryland. He has lived there for 19 years.

Williams often speaks on issues related to bias in the justice system and increasing diversity in the legal profession. He believes that judges are poised to be leaders in the judicial system and that they are the ones that can tackle the issues and set the path for encouraging diversity and inclusion at all levels. He has given keynote speeches at multiple conferences, such as the National HBCU Pre-Law Summit & Law Expo and the National Black Pre-Law Conference and Law Fair. He has also been a panelist for events like the Microsoft Criminal Justice Reform Town Hall and the National Bar Association, Women Lawyer's Division, Greater Washington Area Chapter (GWAC). In 2016, Williams spoke at the White House regarding the role of judges in setting up returning citizens for success after incarceration. In 2017, he served as a panelist for Google's Data, Justice, & Reentry Workforce Opportunities presentation.

== Awards ==
- In 2019, Williams was named a top leader in law in the state of Maryland.
- In 2018, Williams was named as the Maryland Daily Record's VIP List of Most successful by 40.
- In 2018, Williams was named as the National Bar Association's 40 Under 40 Nation's Best Advocates.
- In 2017, Williams was named Top 40 Under 40 Emerging Leader in the Washington Metropolitan area by The Leadership Center for Excellence. He became the first Judge to win the award.
- In 2016, Williams was spotlighted by the ABA's Section on Litigation for his participation in Judicial Internship Opportunity Program (JIOP).
- In 2015, Williams received the North Star Award from the Sylvania Woods African Americans in the Law Conference.
- In 2008, Williams received the District of Columbia Office of the Attorney General's (OAG) Extra Mile Attorney Award.
- In 2005, Williams received the Hariston Alumni Award by the Sylvania Woods African Americans in the Law Conference.
