= Mark Sloan (Grey's Anatomy) =

Fictional surgeon from Grey's Anatomy

- Grey's Anatomy character
- Eric Dane as Mark Sloan
- First appearance: "Yesterday" (2.18); February 19, 2006, (as guest star) "Sometimes a Fantasy" (3.03); October 5, 2006, (as series regular)
- Last appearance: "Remember the Time" (09.02); October 4, 2012, "Breathe" (17.10); April 1, 2021 (as special guest star)
- Created by: Shonda Rhimes
- Portrayed by: Eric Dane

In-universe information
- Full name: Mark Everett Sloan
- Nicknames: McSteamy, Pretty and Prettier (along with Derek Shepherd)
- Title(s): MD, FACS
- Occupation: Plastic Surgeon; ENT; Chief of Plastic Surgery (former); Interim Chief of Surgery (Former)
- Family: Unnamed mother (deceased); Callie Torres (baby mama); Arizona Robbins (baby mama)
- Significant others: Addison Forbes Montgomery (affair); Callie Torres (ex-friend with benefits); Lexie Grey (soulmate; deceased); Teddy Altman (ex-lover); Amelia Shepherd (one-night stand); Julia Canner (ex-girlfriend); Samantha Riley (ex-girlfriend, daughter's mother)
- Children: Sloan Riley (with Samantha); Sofia Robbins Sloan Torres (with Callie and Arizona)
- Alma mater: Columbia University
- Born: 1968
- Died: 2012
- Status: Deceased

Mark Everett Sloan, MD, FACS, was a fictional character on the ABC television series Grey's Anatomy, portrayed by actor Eric Dane. Created by the show's executive producer and creator Shonda Rhimes, the character was introduced in Season 2 as the former best friend of Derek Shepherd (Patrick Dempsey). Mark played a significant role in Derek's life but caused a rift between them by having an affair with Derek’s wife, Addison Montgomery (Kate Walsh), which ultimately ended Derek's first marriage.

In Season 3, Mark relocates to Seattle in an attempt to reconcile with Derek and begins working as the new attending plastic surgeon at Seattle Grace Hospital. His striking looks earned him the nickname "McSteamy" among the female interns. Mark's prominent storyline involved his romantic relationship with Lexie Grey (Chyler Leigh), one of the interns on his service. Their on-again, off-again romance was a central theme in the series, showcasing their deep connection despite the complications surrounding them.

Mark and Lexie's fates were sealed in the Season 8 finale, when both characters sustained critical injuries in an aviation accident. Though Mark initially survives the crash, he succumbs to his injuries in the early episodes of season nine. Following their deaths, Seattle Grace Mercy West Hospital is renamed Grey Sloan Memorial Hospital in honor of Mark and Lexie.

Mark's character was praised for his complexity, from being a charismatic and womanizing surgeon to a man who deeply cared about those close to him, especially Lexie, Derek and Callie Torres (Sara Ramirez). His death remains one of the most emotional moments in the series' history.

== Storylines ==
Mark Sloan first appears in Season 2. He is a highly respected plastic surgeon, specializing in otorhinolaryngology and the childhood best friend of neurosurgeon Derek Shepherd (Patrick Dempsey). In his first appearance, he flirts with Derek's girlfriend Meredith Grey (Ellen Pompeo), and Derek punches him in the face. Derek explains that Mark had an affair with his wife, Addison Montgomery (Kate Walsh), while they were living in New York, which caused Derek to leave New York. Mark travels to Seattle, intending to convince Addison to return with him to New York, but his offer is rejected, and Derek declines to renew their friendship. Mark returns during Season 3 at Addison's drunken behest, but she again rejects him once sober. Undeterred, Mark sells his successful private practice (which he previously shared with Derek) and takes over the plastics service at Seattle Grace Hospital. During Meredith's morphine rampage, Mark finds out about his nickname "McSteamy," which was given to him during his first trip to Seattle when he attempted to get Addison back and re-earn Derek's friendship. It is later revealed that Mark has slept with all of Derek's sisters. Mark has a brief fling with Addison's friend, orthopedic surgeon Callie Torres (Sara Ramirez), and develops a friendship with Meredith. It is revealed that after Derek left New York, Mark and Addison continued their relationship for two months, during which she conceived and aborted his child. Addison broke their relationship off after catching him with another woman. Just weeks after moving to Seattle, Mark quickly observes that Derek's true love is Meredith and tries to convince Addison that her marriage with Derek is over. Mark enters into a sixty-day abstinence pact with Addison, agreeing that if he can remain celibate for that time, Addison will give their relationship another chance. Addison ultimately breaks the pact by having sex with intern Alex Karev (Justin Chambers), and soon thereafter departs from Seattle to work in Los Angeles.

Mark supports Derek when Meredith comes close to dying after drowning, and the two are able to rekindle their friendship. It is eventually revealed that he and Derek grew up together and that he, having lost his mother as a child and his father emotionally neglecting him, considered Derek's mother his maternal figure. As he was an only child and Derek was the only son, they became close friends, and he was Derek's best man at the latter's wedding to Addison. He also forms a friendship with Callie and develops an attraction to cardiothoracic surgeon Erica Hahn (Brooke Smith). Erica does not reciprocate his feelings, and he is supportive of Callie when she and Erica have a brief relationship. When Addison shows up at Seattle Grace for a case, Mark attempts to sleep with her again, but she refuses. The nurses later start a club called "Nurses United Against Mark Sloan". After a string of unresolved sexual tension, Mark finds himself seduced by Lexie Grey (Chyler Leigh), despite Derek's request that he keep their relationship platonic. They begin a sexual relationship, which Lexie halts until he publicly admits to being her partner. Mark eventually agrees and tells Derek, who attacks him. Animosity exists between them for several episodes, but they repair their friendship once more. Mark and Lexie's relationship becomes increasingly serious. He meets her father, Thatcher Grey (Jeff Perry), and at the end of Season 5, asks Lexie to move in with him. Though Lexie initially declines, he remains committed to their relationship, and she agrees early in Season 6.

Mark discovers that he has an 18-year-old daughter named Sloan (Leven Rambin), who arrives seeking his support after becoming pregnant and being evicted by her mother. Mark allows her to move in with him, which upsets Lexie. When Lexie realizes that Mark would choose his daughter over her, she ends their relationship. Sloan experiences difficulties in her pregnancy, so Mark takes her to Los Angeles to be treated. He and Addison once again sleep together, but he tells Lexie because he doesn't want to lie and wants them to get back together. However, when she reveals she slept with Alex, their relationship ends. When Sloan decides to give her baby up for adoption, Mark and Callie offer to raise it together. Sloan reluctantly agrees but later quietly leaves Seattle, leaving Mark devastated. He enters into a relationship with cardiothoracic surgeon Teddy Altman (Kim Raver), despite knowing she is in love with their trauma colleague, Owen Hunt (Kevin McKidd). Sloan returns unexpectedly and gives birth to a son in Mark’s apartment. She reconsiders the adoption, but after Mark reassures her that he will support her, she gives the baby to an adoptive couple.

In the Season 6 finale, a gunman commits mass murder at the hospital. Mark helps Lexie save Alex, her new boyfriend. In the aftermath of the shooting, Lexie has a nervous breakdown, and Mark has her committed to the psychiatric unit. Their friendship is strained, but Lexie softens when she learns that he is still in love with her. As Lexie goes to talk to Mark about his feelings, she sees him entering his apartment with Derek's sister, Amelia, and kissing her. When Callie's girlfriend, pediatric surgeon Arizona Robbins (Jessica Capshaw), breaks up with her, she and Mark have a drunken one-night stand. Shortly after, he reconciles with Lexie but is delighted when Callie discovers she is pregnant with his child. Lexie, however, is dismayed by the news and leaves Mark once again.

Mark asks Dr. Jackson Avery (Jesse Williams) to find out how Lexie is doing, but Jackson lies, and he starts dating Lexie. Meanwhile, Callie and Arizona get into a car crash. Mark and Callie’s daughter is born prematurely and Callie fights to survive in the hospital. After the recovery, he is entirely involved with co-parenting his daughter Sofia alongside Callie and Arizona. Mark later gives Jackson and Lexie his blessing and tells Lexie he will let her go; Lexie replies that she still loves him, but she needs Jackson to be happy. After some tension, Mark acknowledges Jackson's surgical skills and decides to teach him, though he still has feelings for Lexie. After a long time without dating, Mark begins a relationship with ophthalmologist Julia Canner (Holley Fain), making Lexie jealous. This leads to her breakup with Jackson. Lexie struggles to express her feelings but finally admits them, leaving Mark torn between her and Julia. In the Season 8 finale, Mark, Lexie, Derek, Meredith, Arizona and Cristina Yang (Sandra Oh) are involved in a plane crash while on the way to Boise, Idaho, to perform surgery on conjoined twins, with Lexie crushed under debris. After trying and failing to save her, Mark holds Lexie's hand, telling her he has always and will always love her. He and the remaining crash survivors are left stranded in the woods, mourning Lexie and fighting to survive.

In the Season 9 premiere, it is revealed that Mark is on life support due to his extensive injuries from the crash. According to his will, the machines will be turned off if he shows no signs of improvement within 30 days. Flashbacks show Mark extending congratulations to newlyweds Callie and Arizona, stating that Lexie is the one he wants to grow old and dance with at their granddaughter's wedding. At 5:00, with Derek and Callie by his side, the machines are turned off, and Mark dies shortly after. The following episode reveals that Mark had a brief surge of good health before ultimately succumbing to his injuries. During this surge, he advises his protégé Jackson, "when you love someone, tell them", reflecting on his own relationship with Lexie. He also ends his relationship with Julia, stating that it was not fair to her as he always loved Lexie.

Following Mark's death, Shonda Rhimes reflected on his and Lexie's relationship: "...he and Lexie get to be together in a way. Their love remains true." Seattle Grace Mercy West Hospital is later renamed Grey Sloan Memorial Hospital in tribute to Lexie and Mark.

== Spouse and Relationships ==
In the episode "Yesterday", while flirting with Dr. Meredith Grey, he mentions that he was previously married but his wife had died.

While in the show he never married, throughout the series he had several notable relationships-most notably:

=== Addison Montgomery-Shepherd ===
His affair with Addison (while she was married to Dr. Derek Shepherd) is what ended Addison and Derek's marriage.

=== Lexie Grey ===
His relationship with Lexie is his most emotionally significant relationship. He deeply loved her, and they nearly got back together before both died in the season 8 plane crash.

=== Callie Torres ===
He and Callie shared a deep friendship. They both were good friends throughout the series till his death. However, he had multiple sexual encounters with Callie, one of which resulted in their child, Sofia.

=== Teddy Altman ===
They had a brief romantic involvement during season 6. Their relationship naturally dissolved without a breakup.

=== Julia Canner ===
She was an ophthalmologist in Seattle Presbyterian Hospital. He dated her later in the series but broke up with her because he still loved Lexie.

== Development ==
=== Casting and creation ===
Dane auditioned for the role during the casting of the pilot and ultimately received it, though his character was introduced only later in the show. He initially appeared as a guest star in the Season 2 episode "Yesterday", before becoming a series regular starting with the Season 3 episode "Sometimes a Fantasy," first broadcast in October 2006. Casting director Linda Lowy provided insight into the decision: "You can't forget about McSteamy. We cast (Dane) for one episode, and I think the women across the nation went kind of crazy. Everyone was talking about him, so we decided to make him a regular."

In July 2012, TVLine announced that Dane would leave the show after the first two episodes of the Season 9. Rhimes explained that she and Dane had decided to conclude Mark's storyline after much discussion, adding: "It was something Eric had been thinking about for a while, but it felt like the right time to him." However, E! Online reported that Rhimes had been compelled by the network to reduce the cast due to budget reasons and that Dane had not asked to leave the series.

=== Characterization ===
The American Broadcasting Company (ABC) described Sloan as "charming," "confident," "smug," "smarmy," and "great with his hands". Shonda Rhimes commented on the character: "Mark, the original bad boy, is struggling with his own demons. He brings a healthy serving of mystery and potential conflict to Seattle Grace." Actress Kate Walsh noted: "He's the guy you shouldn't go out with, but you can't help yourself." Carolina Paiz, one of the series' writers, added: "He can be impertinent and evil and demeaning."

== Reception ==
Mark Sloan's relationship with Chyler Leigh's Lexie Grey was well-received by both critics and fans, with Chris Monfette of IGN stating, "Sloan's honest relationship with Lexie helped to make both characters infinitely more interesting and mature."

Sloan's role in the Season 5 episode "In the Midnight Hour" was praised by Debbie Chang of BuddyTV, who wrote, "Mark (Eric Dane) is pretty freaking awesome in this episode. He's lascivious as all heck, but he's showing some compassion." His scenes with Shepherd were described as "fun." Victor Balta of Today included their friendship in its "TV's best bromances" list, calling them "the most exciting couple on Grey’s". He explained, "They’ve demonstrated an easy chemistry that makes for some of the great comic relief around Seattle Grace Hospital with their banter, sage wisdom on each other’s lives, and locker room-style teasing". Their bromance was also featured in lists by About.com, BuddyTV, Cosmopolitan and Wetpaint. However, after the announcement of Dane's departure from the show, Mark Perigard of the Boston Herald felt that Sloan and Derek "never clicked like you’d expect friends would. Any scene they had together ranged from uncomfortable to forced".

Sloan's bromance with Jackson Avery was also positively received. Janalen Samson of BuddyTV noted, "Eric Dane has always shown a facility for sly, deft comedy and these scenes with Jesse Williams are proving to be gems. I do love a good bromance, and these two actors are bringing the love and the funny in spades". Writing for TV Fanatic, Courtney Morrison commented, "Sloan has brought the GA comedy scale up a bit with his bromances and mentoring Jackson". The pairing was also listed in Zap2it's 25 Top Bromances of 2012. The Los Angeles Times TV columnist Carina Mackenzie described Sloan's scenes with Torres as "always perfectly sharp".

== Awards ==
In 2006, Dane was also a part of the ensemble cast that won the Satellite Award for Best Cast – Television Series. He was also part of the ensemble cast that won the Screen Actors Guild Award for Outstanding Performance by an Ensemble in a Drama Series in 2007 for which they were also nominated in 2008.

== Sources ==
- "Mark Sloan's Character Journey". ABC. 2012. Archived from the original on October 1, 2012.
- "Grey's Anatomy: Episode Recap Guide". ABC.
