= A Change Is Gonna Come (Grey's Anatomy) =

- Grey's Anatomy episode
- Episode no.: Season 4 Episode 1
- Directed by: Michael Grossman
- Written by: Eric Buchman
- Original air date: September 27, 2007
- Running time: 43 minutes

Guest appearances
- Stephanie Childers as Nancy Walters; Terrence Flack as Henry Flynn; Mark Pellegrino as Chris; Sandra Thigpen as Clara; Steven M. Porter as Joey

Episode chronology
| ← Previous "Didn't We Almost Have It All?" | Next → "Love/Addiction" |
- Grey's Anatomy season 4

"A Change Is Gonna Come" is the first episode and the season premiere of the fourth season of the American television medical drama Grey's Anatomy, and the show's 62nd episode overall. Written by series creator Shonda Rhimes and directed by Rob Corn, the episode aired on the American Broadcasting Company (ABC) in the United States on September 27, 2007.

The episode primarily focused on Cristina Yang (Sandra Oh) dealing with the aftermath of Preston Burke's (Isaiah Washington) departure and the dissolution of their engagement, Izzie Stevens (Katherine Heigl) struggling with her romantic feelings towards the married George O'Malley (T. R. Knight), and Callie Torres (Sara Ramirez) learning to deal with her new position of Chief Resident. Also dealt with was Alex Karev (Justin Chambers) coping with Rebecca Pope's (Elizabeth Reaser) departure, and Meredith Grey (Ellen Pompeo) facing the conclusion of her relationship with Derek Shepherd (Patrick Dempsey), while dealing with the arrival of her half-sister, Lexie Grey (Chyler Leigh), who enrolls in the surgical program at the hospital.

Although the episode was fictionally set in Seattle, Washington, filming occurred in Los Angeles, California. It was the first not to feature Isaiah Washington (Preston Burke), who was fired from the series at the conclusion of Season 3. The episode also was the first to not feature Kate Walsh (Addison Montgomery) as a series regular, as she transitioned to become the main character in Grey's Anatomy's spin-off Private Practice; however, Walsh did appear in the subsequent seasons in guest star capacity. It also marked Leigh's promotion to series regular status, following her guest appearances in the last 2 episodes of the previous season. Also featured were one-time guest actors Mark Pellegrino, Stephania Childers, Sandra Thigpen, and Steven Porter.

The episode was viewed by 20.93 million Americans in the United States upon its original airing, ranking #2 in the time-slot and #3 for the week, and garnered a 7.3 Nielsen rating in the 18–49 demographic, seeing a decrease from the previous episode, which received an 8.0 rating. It received mixed-to-negative reviews from television critics upon telecast; however, Cristina's storyline received critical acclaim.

"A Change Is Gonna Come" and then "Love/Addiction" are the latest additions by Grey's Anatomy to the Touchstone Television logo. Afterwards, Touchstone Television was succeeded by ABC Studios.

== Plot ==
The episode opens with a voice-over narration from Meredith Grey (Ellen Pompeo) reflecting on the theme of change.

After completing their internships, Meredith, Cristina Yang (Sandra Oh), Izzie Stevens (Katherine Heigl), and Alex Karev (Justin Chambers) begin their surgical residency, facing new responsibilities, including mentoring the latest batch of interns. George O'Malley (T. R. Knight), having failed his post-internship exam in the previous season's finale, must repeat his internship year, putting him in the difficult position of starting over.

It is revealed that Lexie Grey (Chyler Leigh), Meredith's half-sister, is among the new interns. Unbeknownst to both at the time, she had a brief, flirtatious encounter with Derek Shepherd (Patrick Dempsey) at Joe's Bar, before he realized who she was. Meanwhile, Callie Torres (Sara Ramirez) struggles in her new role as Chief Resident, a position she was given over Miranda Bailey (Chandra Wilson), and she faces challenges asserting authority and gaining respect from her subordinates.

Following her breakup with Preston Burke (Isaiah Washington)—who left her at the altar—Cristina has just returned from traveling with Meredith, only to discover that Burke has resigned from Seattle Grace and moved away without informing anyone. Izzie grapples with her feelings for George, who is married to Callie but is secretly having an affair with her. George, now repeating his internship, finds a confidante in Lexie, who chooses to keep his secret about failing his exam. Meanwhile, Alex is shown to have visited Rebecca Pope (Elizabeth Reaser) after her departure.

In the absence of Addison Montgomery (Kate Walsh), who moved to Los Angeles, Mark Sloan (Eric Dane) seeks to repair his friendship with Derek. Though initially hesitant, Derek eventually gives Mark a second chance. Bailey, frustrated at being passed over for Chief Resident despite her outstanding reputation, displays a cold demeanor toward Richard Webber (James Pickens, Jr.) as a way to express her disappointment.

Lexie meets Meredith for the first time, but the encounter is awkward, with Meredith clearly uncomfortable. Meredith and Derek, despite breaking up, struggle to stay apart due to their lingering feelings for each other, complicating their attempts to move on.

The emergency room becomes overwhelmed with patients from a major car accident. One patient, admitted to the neurosurgery department under Derek and Cristina's care, is discovered to be internally decapitated, meaning that even the slightest movement could prove fatal. A pregnant woman, whose arm has been severed in the accident, is brought into plastic surgery, and Meredith, assigned to work with Sloan, is tasked with finding the missing arm, to the amazement of her interns. Izzie, struggling to be taken seriously by her interns, damages her professional image further when she abandons her duties to help perform surgery on a deer.

Meredith and Derek have a candid conversation about the difficulties of their breakup and acknowledge that their feelings remain strong. Despite this, they realize they cannot reconcile their relationship. However, they end up having sex one last time as a way to express their unresolved emotions.

George admits to himself that he is in love with Izzie and tells her that he shares her feelings, deepening the complications in his marriage to Callie.

== Production ==
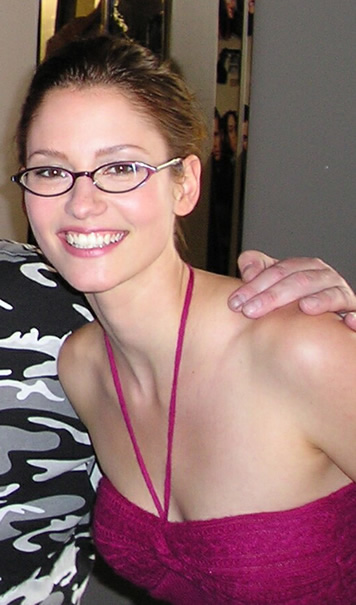
Due to the producers wanting to replace the 2 departed characters, Chyler Leigh began receiving star billing in "A Change Is Gonna Come".

"A Change Is Gonna Come" was written by series creator and executive producer Shonda Rhimes, and directed by filmmaker and series veteran Rob Corn. The episode's soundtrack included Mat Kearney's "Breathe In, Breathe Out", I'm from Barcelona's "Oversleeping", Meiko's "Reasons to Love You" and Cinematic Orchestra's "To Build A Home". Also featured was "Knock 'Em Out", the second track from British pop singer-songwriter Lily Allen's debut album, Alright, Still. Several guest stars appeared in the episode, including Mark Pellegrino as Chris, Stephania Childers as Nancy Walters, Sandra Thigpen as Clara, and Steven Porter as Joey. Although the episode is fictionally set in Seattle, Washington, filming primarily took place in Los Angeles, California, with operating room scenes filmed at The Prospect Studios in Los Feliz, Los Angeles.

The Season 4 premiere marked Chyler Leigh's first appearance as a main cast member. Leigh had previously appeared during the final three episodes of Season 3 as Meredith Grey's half-sister, Lexie. Following Isaiah Washington's departure from the series, it was reported that executives planned to add new cast members, including Lexie. Leigh was officially upgraded to series regular status on July 11, 2007, for Season 4. Rhimes explained her decision to cast Leigh, stating, "We met with a lot of young actresses, but Chyler stood out. She had a quality that felt right and real to me. It felt like she could be Meredith's sister, but she had a depth that was very interesting." Leigh described her first days on set as "daunting," but shared that she "had such a great time" working with the main cast. This episode also introduced a new generation of interns, all in co-star capacity except for Lexie.

"A Change Is Gonna Come" was the first episode in two years not to feature Kate Walsh as a series regular, due to her transition to Private Practice, the spin-off from Grey's Anatomy. Walsh's character, Addison Montgomery continued to appear as a guest star in future seasons.

The episode marked the first absence of Washington's character, Preston Burke, following Washington's termination from the series. Washington's departure followed an on-set controversy during Season 3, where he was accused of using a homophobic slur against co-star T. R. Knight (who portrays George O'Malley). After this incident gained media attention, Knight publicly came out as gay, and Washington issued a public apology. The controversy reignited after Washington made further remarks at the 2007 Golden Globe Awards, which were widely condemned. Despite his public apologies and executive counseling, Washington's contract was not renewed, leading to his dismissal from the show. He later expressed his anger about the decision and suggested that racism within the broadcasting industry contributed to his firing, an assertion that drew criticism from Rhimes. In an appearance on Larry King Live, Washington denied using a homophobic slur in reference to Knight.

Rhimes highlighted O'Malley's story arc, focusing on his relationships with Izzie Stevens and Callie Torres. She explained, "The interns are now residents with their own interns, except George, who's repeating his intern year. He's the only one who hasn't changed, but by the end, he has. He tells Izzie he loves her too, which takes guts because he knows the complications that come with it." The episode also explored Meredith's emotional struggle with her relationship with Derek Shepherd, and Cristina Yang's attempts to move on from Burke, whose sudden departure has left her devastated.

The episode also saw Mark Sloan and Derek reconciling, following the departure of Addison. Rhimes discussed the arrival of Lexie, stating, "Lexie is here to stay. I love that she's a bit of a dork. Being a dork myself, I am fond of girls with verbal diarrhea." Regarding the tension between Miranda Bailey and Richard Webber, Rhimes pointed out Bailey's frustration at being passed over for the Chief Resident position in favor of Callie, noting Webber's flawed judgment in making that decision.

== Release ==
"A Change Is Gonna Come" was originally broadcast in the United States on September 27, 2007, airing on the American Broadcasting Company (ABC) in its regular 9:00 Eastern time-slot. Viewed by a total of 20.93 million viewers, the episode became the series' second most-watched season premiere, just behind the Season 3 opener, which had been watched live by 25.41 million American viewers. Compared to the previous episode, which garnered 22.57 million viewers, "A Change Is Gonna Come" experienced a 21% decrease in viewership. Nevertheless, the episode ranked #2 in its time-slot and the entire night, trailing only CBS's CSI: Crime Scene Investigation, which attracted 25.22 million viewers. For the week, the episode ranked #3, following both CSI and fellow ABC show Dancing with the Stars. In terms of ratings, the episode also performed well, earning a 7.3 Nielsen rating in household viewership, ranking #2 in its time-slot and #3 for the week.

== Reception ==
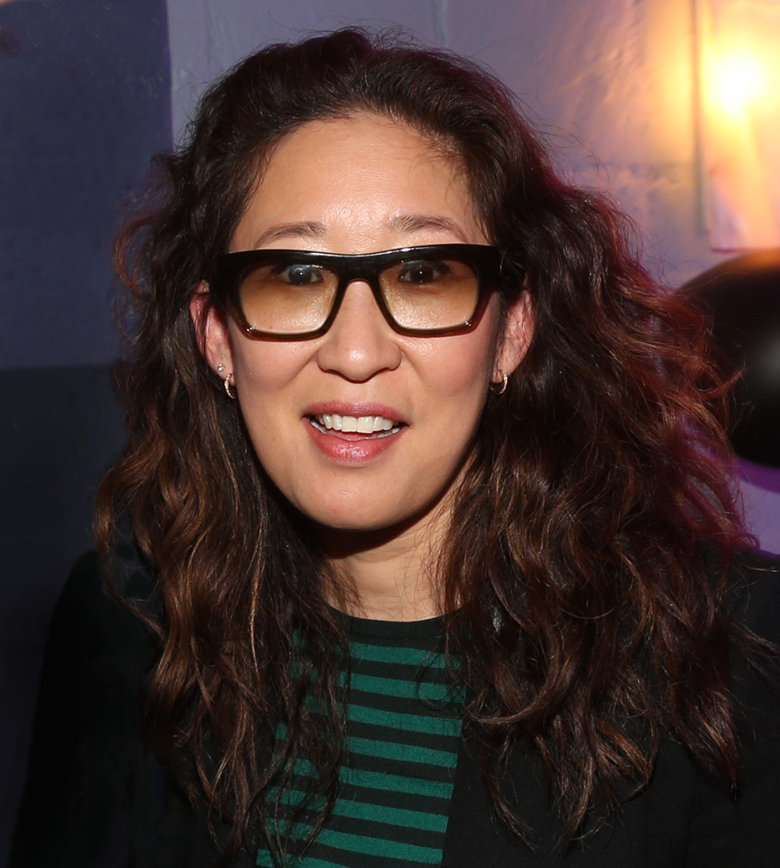
Sandra Oh's performance as Cristina Yang was one of the few sources of critical praise upon the episode from television reviewers, with most of them enjoying her adaptability to the unrealistic character.

"A Change Is Gonna Come" received mixed-to-negative reviews from television critics upon telecast; however, Cristina Yang's (Sandra Oh) storyline received critical acclaim.

Debbie Chang of BuddyTV deemed the episode "dysfunctional and ridiculous", particularly criticizing Izzie Stevens' (Katherine Heigl) storyline, which she felt did not justify her promotion to a resident. Chang disagreed with how Miranda Bailey (Chandra Wilson) and Derek Shepherd (Patrick Dempsey) were written, feeling Bailey's anger should have been self-directed and that Shepherd's emotional immaturity was exaggerated. Nonetheless, she praised Cristina's storyline, especially her method of repressing her feelings, as a highlight. Chang expressed overall disappointment in the episode as a season opener, stating, "I can see already that this season will continue to bring us medical cases that are so blatantly about the doctors' pathetic lives."

Eileen Lulevitch of TV Guide offered a more favorable review, writing that watching the season premiere felt like "welcoming an old friend back into your home." She appreciated the way the episode acknowledged Bailey's importance through her former interns' homage and praised Meredith Grey's (Ellen Pompeo) character development, as well as Lexie Grey's (Chyler Leigh) introduction. Lulevitch was less positive about Callie Torres' (Sara Ramirez) as Chief Resident, criticizing the storyline as unrealistic, but acknowledged the episode's focus on Callie adjusting to her new role as central to the plot. Cristina's storyline was praised for the moment she realizes how much she misses Preston Burke (Isaiah Washington), with Lulevitch noting the predictability of her emotional arc. Writing for IGN, Laura Burrows also commended the episode for introducing a new set of interns and creating new drama with George O'Malley (T. R. Knight) repeating his intern year, though she recognized that some storylines felt overly familiar.

Heigl, who portrayed Izzie, was critical of her character's relationship with O'Malley, labeling it a "ratings ploy". She explained, "They really hurt somebody, and they didn't seem to be taking a lot of responsibility for it. I have a really hard time with that kind of thing. I'm maybe a little too black and white about it. I don't really know Izzie very well right now." Alan Sepinwall of The Star-Ledger was similarly critical, calling the episode "childish and ridiculous" and describing Izzie's storyline with the deer as "not cute, not character-illuminating, just dumb." He also critiqued Callie' character regression, labeling her scenes difficult to watch. Despite these negative remarks, Sepinwall expressed optimism about Lexie's arrival, writing that while the character felt like a clone of Season 1 Meredith, there were few other likable characters left in the show, so the manipulation was tolerable. In contrast, the reviewer for BuzzSugar criticized the episode for moving away from the show's original tone, though they praised Lexie's introduction.

Entertainment Weekly later ranked the inclusion of the deer as one of the "Most Memorable Cases of Grey's Anatomy", placing it at #12 in their 2009 ranking.
