= Grey's Anatomy season 4 =

Season of television series

Grey's Anatomy
- Season 4
- DVD cover art for the fourth season of Grey's Anatomy
- Showrunners: Mark Wilding; Shonda Rhimes; Krista Vernoff
- Starring: Ellen Pompeo; Sandra Oh; Katherine Heigl; Justin Chambers; T. R. Knight; Chandra Wilson; James Pickens Jr.; Sara Ramirez; Eric Dane; Chyler Leigh; Brooke Smith; Patrick Dempsey
- No. of episodes: 17

Release
- Original network: ABC
- Original release: September 27, 2007 – May 22, 2008

Season chronology
- ← Previous; Season 3 Next → Season 5

The fourth season of the American television medical drama Grey's Anatomy, commenced airing on the American Broadcasting Company (ABC) channel on September 27, 2007, and concluded on May 22, 2008. The season continues the story of a group of surgeons and their mentors in the fictional Seattle Grace Hospital, describing their professional lives and how they're influenced by the personal background of each character. Out of 12 series regulars, 10 of them returned from the previous season, 8 of which were part of the original cast from the first season.

The season aired in the Thursday night timeslot at 9:00 EST. In addition to the regular 17 episodes, a clip-show narrated by the editors of People recapped previous events of the show and made the transition from Grey's Anatomy to Private Practice, a spin-off focusing on Dr. Addison Montgomery, and aired on September 19, 2007, before the season premiere. The season was officially released on DVD as a 5-disc box-set under the title of Grey's Anatomy: Season Four – Expanded on September 9, 2008, by Buena Vista Home Entertainment.

For the first time in the show's history, many cast changes occurred, seeing the first departure of two main cast members. Despite garnering several awards and nominations for the cast members and the production team, the season received a mixed response from critics and fans. Show creator Shonda Rhimes heavily contributed to the production of the season, writing 5 out of the 17 episodes. The highest-rated episode was the season premiere, which was watched by 20.93 million viewers. The season was interrupted by the 2007–2008 Writers Guild of America strike, which resulted in the production of only 17 episodes, instead of 23 originally planned.

The website Screen Rant ranked the season at number 11 on their 2023 ranking of the 19 Grey's Anatomy seasons that had aired at the time.

== Episodes ==
Each episode of this season is named after a song.

No. overall	No. in season	Title	Directed by	Written by	Original release date	Prod. code	U.S. viewers (millions)
62	1	"A Change Is Gonna Come"	Rob Corn	Shonda Rhimes	September 27, 2007	401	20.93
Having just returned from her honeymoon with Meredith, Cristina searches for Burke, but he is nowhere to be found. Meredith, Cristina, Izzie and Alex spend their first day as residents with their own groups of interns. Among the interns are George, repeating his intern year after failing his exams, and Lexie Grey, Meredith's half-sister whom she has never met. The residents and interns have to deal with the victims of a multi-car pile-up, including a man who came to life, a pregnant woman who lost an arm, and a man with a compulsive desire to eat. Izzie attracts her interns' ire by having them treat a deer. Now that Derek's relationship with Meredith has reached an emotional impasse, he looks to his fellow doctors for friendship. Webber resumes his position as Chief of Surgery. Bailey wrestles with her place within the hospital now that her former interns report to new Chief Resident Callie, who struggles with her new position.
63	2	"Love/Addiction"	James Frawley	Debora Cahn	October 4, 2007	402	18.51
An apartment explosion inundates the ER with patients, and Alex jeopardizes a family when he realizes the cause of the accident. Meanwhile, Meredith intrigues Derek with an "S&M" (sex and mockery)(even though Derek wanted a full blown relationship but Meredith was being stubborn) approach on their relationship, and Derek gets the wrong idea. Cristina begins giving her wedding gifts to her colleagues in exchange for surgeries. Mama Burke returns to collect Burke's things, and gives judgement and advice to the doctors. George decides to break up with Callie after realizing that he has feelings for Izzie, but Izzie stops him when she has to work with Callie, and sees how she's struggling. Callie clashes with Bailey after she sends Meredith to the clinic after becoming annoyed with Lexie and another intern. Meredith rebuffs Lexie's attempts to get to know her. Webber begins delegating in a bid to get back with Adele.
64	3	"Let the Truth Sting"	Daniel Minahan	Mark Wilding	October 11, 2007	403	19.04
When the "really old guy" awakens from his coma, Izzie becomes aggravated with him over his attempts to end his life. Izzie puts pressure on George to end things with Callie. Callie and George find themselves both very tense in their hotel room. Bailey confronts Callie over the amount of effort that she is putting in as Chief Resident. Meredith and Lexie's rocky relationship continues because of Meredith's teaching technique, but Bailey intervenes in order to help Lexie develop. Cristina begins faking sadness to get more surgeries. Alex gets a new intern, Norman, and is forced to do a procedure he's unfamiliar with on a patient when Derek becomes unavailable. Mark and Webber attempt a surgery neither has performed before, and Derek has to remind them of the risk they took. Alex tells the other interns that George is repeating his internship.
65	4	"The Heart of the Matter"	Randall Zisk	Allan Heinberg	October 18, 2007	404	18.04
Meredith agrees to go away with Derek for the weekend, but has to take Norman off of Alex. However, Derek realizes that he and Meredith want different things, and considers ending their relationship. Meredith gets annoyed at Norman after his error leads to them telling the wrong patient that she's dying. Callie forgives George for sleeping with Izzie. Lexie stands up to Cristina, and Derek criticizes her teaching style. George desperately tries to find Izzie before Callie can, while Izzie admits to Alex that she slept with George. Derek, Cristina and Lexie treat a college football player who faces paralysis, whose dad is still heavily critical of him. Bailey and Callie have to deal with a patient who wants to leave the hospital as quickly as possible so she can continue training to earn the approval of her boyfriend, and Callie takes her personal issues out on him when the patient dies. Webber's niece ends up back in the hospital, and Webber is disheartened when she admits that she doesn't want further cancer treatment.
66	5	"Haunt You Every Day"	Bethany Rooney	Krista Vernoff	October 25, 2007	405	18.18
A nightmare brings Meredith to remove her mother's ashes from her closet. She ends up putting her mother at rest in an operating theatre sink. Meredith also forms an alliance with a little boy to grant him the ears he needs via pro-bono surgery. Alex ignores Norman feeling unwell, which culminates with Norman suffering a stroke. A busy day in the ER results in a man who is convinced that his foot doesn't belong to him trying to remove it with a chainsaw from a jack-o-lantern competition. A heart transplant patient has to face a difficult decision when his daughter is in an accident and rendered brain dead, meaning that her heart has become available to him. Rebecca seeks out Alex. Erica Hahn is invited to perform a heart transplant, and clashes with Cristina. She becomes the replacement for Burke as head Cardiothoracic surgeon. Callie reveals George's affair with Izzie to the hospital. Callie and Cristina bond over their failed relationships, prompting Cristina to invite Callie to move in.
67	6	"Kung Fu Fighting"	Tom Verica	Stacy McKee	November 1, 2007	406	19.31
Webber organizes a gentleman's evening, leaving Derek and Mark dumbfounded, and curious to determine what it really is. Two brides-to-be fight over a dress from a bridal store competition, and this complicates treatment, as neither will release the dress. The doctors treat a parachutist who fell 12,000 feet without a parachute. Callie searches for a way to torture George whilst trying to cope with the stress from her Chief Resident position and impending divorce. Meredith tries getting Cristina to diagnose her personal problems. Izzie prepares to sleep with George for the first time in their new relationship. Erica excludes Cristina from cardio service, which drives Cristina insane and desperate, especially when Erica has Izzie scrub in on an awake open-heart surgery. Alex takes pity on Lexie when he catches her charting in a cupboard, and they eventually sleep together.
68	7	"Physical Attraction, Chemical Reaction"	Jeff Melman	Tony Phelan & Joan Rater	November 8, 2007	407	19.50
Izzie and George's new-founded relationship results in bad sex. Callie shirks her Chief Resident responsibilities and the position is taken away from her, with Bailey as the humble replacement. Meredith continues to struggle with her relationship with Lexie. Cristina is annoyed when Erica swaps her with Meredith, and is then told by Bailey to look for a different specialty. Cristina's woes are worsened when Erica and Meredith take her patient off of her. Both Izzie and Alex have to deal with patients that are annoying them, and get unexpected results when they put them in the same room. George and Bailey operate on an eight-year-old who has taken drastic action following his parents' marital difficulties. Derek finds himself doing chores for Webber, who doesn't know how to be on his own.
69	8	"Forever Young"	Rob Corn	Mark Wilding	November 15, 2007	408	19.61
A bus crash involving high school students causes the doctors to reminisce about their times in high school. Bailey sets out her rules as Chief Resident. A tense confrontation between Lexie and Meredith brings Meredith to feel guilty. Callie gives Cristina some tips to get on Erica's good side when she notices Cristina trying to impress her. An old flame of Bailey's is emotional when he arrives in the ER, and Bailey and Erica clash over how she is with him. Izzie bonds with a teenager, while Derek treats her best friend, who got a pencil jammed in his eye socket in the crash. Mark and Callie have to deal with a victim who wants perfection from them. The news about Izzie and George's relationship problems travels fast around the hospital, and they worsen after Izzie catches wind of people gossiping about them. Thatcher Grey injures himself and requests to be treated by Meredith. Derek meets a nurse, Rose, who appears to be interested in him.
70	9	"Crash Into Me"	Michael Grossman	Shonda Rhimes & Krista Vernoff	November 22, 2007	409	14.11
71	10	"Crash Into Me"	Jessica Yu	Shonda Rhimes & Krista Vernoff	December 6, 2007	410	17.78
Part 1: An ambulance crash makes for a hectic day at Seattle Grace, when Meredith and Webber have to comfort the paramedics trapped inside one of the ambulances. A wounded paramedic creates an uproar in the ER once it's revealed he has a swastika tattoo, offending Bailey. As she operates on him she has the other doctors swear not to use her alias ('the Nazi') anymore. Derek and George treat the driver who caused the accident, and find a brain tumor. Derek and Rose get to know each other better. Bailey faces relationship troubles over how much time she spends at the hospital. Callie, Mark and Erica have to operate on a heart patient who was injured in the crash. Lexie becomes attached to a patient (Seth Green), who has a major artery exposed following the removal of a tumor. Rebecca returns and Lexie finds out Alex has been seeing them both. Part 2: Meredith works to save the life of a paramedic trapped in the flipped ambulance, after his colleague died. Derek has to rely on Rose after the camera monitor breaks during the middle of a surgery, which leads to the pair sharing a kiss, which Derek does not tell Meredith. Meredith asks Derek not to see other people after taking inspiration from some advice Webber gave a patient. Alex is suspended for a week for sneaking Rebecca in to observe a surgery. Izzie realizes that she is not cut out for cardio surgery. Tensions between Bailey and Tucker reach a breaking point when she chooses to operate on the white supremacist paramedic. Cristina takes pity on Lexie after her actions lead to the death of a patient.
72	11	"Lay Your Hands on Me"	John Terlesky	Allan Heinberg	January 10, 2008	411	17.68
When Bailey's son, Tuck, is at Seattle Grace following a bookshelf falling on him, she starts to feel that she might be a bad mother. Tucker and Bailey separate. The return of George's mother brings Callie and George together once more, and his relationship with Izzie has failed. Izzie and Cristina continue their rivalry, and Izzie later admits to Alex that it is based on jealousy. A healer with "powers" at Seattle Grace makes the doctors question science and faith. Meredith discovers Rose and Derek have kissed, which leads to them breaking up. Lexie suffers an allergic reaction after Meredith makes her breakfast.
73	12	"Where the Wild Things Are"	Rob Corn	Zoanne Clack	April 24, 2008	412	16.37
Six weeks have passed since Derek started dating Rose, and the new residents are competing in a surgical contest. Meredith wins, giving her the power to take the other residents' surgeries. Izzie treats a man with a swollen ankle who collapsed, as she believes that he has a mystery illness. The doctors treat a family who were all victims of a bear attack. Meredith thinks that one of the victims might be suffering from a neurological disorder, but she is brushed off by others who think she's just trying to get an opportunity to be with Derek. George and Lexie have moved into their new apartment and Lexie begins stealing stuff from the hospital to furnish it. Callie and Erica continue their friendship. Meredith suggests a neurological clinical trial.
74	13	"Piece of My Heart"	Mark Tinker	Stacy McKee	May 1, 2008	413	15.31
Addison Montgomery visits Seattle Grace from California and she is recapped by the doctors on what has happened in her absence. She suspects that Callie might be having feelings for Erica. The surgeons deal with a mother whose baby's heart has developed outside of his chest, and Mark becomes a bit too pompous when he feels like he is God. Izzie is jealous that George is developing a good relationship with his fellow interns. Rebecca reveals she is pregnant. Izzie is shocked when her pregnant patient wants an abortion, but both eventually regain their ability to fight. Meredith is concerned after the patient in her clinical trial goes blind. Erica finally tells Cristina why she won't teach her.
75	14	"The Becoming"	Julie Anne Robinson	Tony Phelan & Joan Rater	May 8, 2008	414	16.03
A "date and tell" policy is instated at Seattle Grace after the nurses object to Mark's trysts, causing everybody in the hospital to have to register their relations with one another. Lexie is concerned to find out Alex forgot to register their night together. Webber comes face to face with Adele again. News of Burke winning an award reaches the hospital, unsettling both Cristina and Erica. Callie starts having sex with Mark to avoid Erica. Meredith and Derek admit a gay veteran soldier into their clinical trial. George is given the title 'Intern to the Chief'. Alex starts moonlighting at Joe's, so he can get money for a house for him and Rebecca. Meredith's therapist gets tough.
76	15	"Losing My Mind"	James Frawley	Debora Cahn	May 15, 2008	415	15.55
Meredith's therapy leads her to question her past. Derek and Meredith are at loggerheads when a patient in their clinical trial wants to delay treatment to wait for her boyfriend, whom her sister insists doesn't exist. Callie begins to wonder if she is straight or lesbian, and she tries to avoid the topic. Mark tries shaking off his "whore" image, by trying to get emotional with Callie. Webber's mentor arrives at the hospital requiring treatment, but Erica is reluctant to operate on a legend. Cristina is lashing out, and eventually Lexie bites back. Izzie tries to tell Alex that Rebecca is not pregnant.
77	16	"Freedom"	Rob Corn	Shonda Rhimes	May 22, 2008	416	18.09
78	17	"Freedom"	Rob Corn	Shonda Rhimes	May 22, 2008	417	18.09
A surgical team battles the clock as they try to save a young man encased in cement. Alex's situation with an ever-disintegrating Rebecca brings back painful memories that interfere with his judgment. Derek and Meredith have one last chance at their clinical trial. The parents of one of the patients want Derek and Meredith to move the other patient in the trial elsewhere. Lexie looks at the residents' case files. Meredith gives the "sparkle pager" to Cristina, to help her cope with her depression. Derek and Meredith's relationship becomes more fractured as Meredith tries to push for the surviving patient to have the clinical trial. However, when the trial has a positive outcome, Derek and Meredith decide to restart their relationship. Izzie is concerned when Alex tries to treat Rebecca after she slit her wrists. After Bailey sees Izzie struggling, she gives her the clinic. Mark ends his relationship with Callie, which leads to Erica and Callie kissing. Webber prepares to win back Adele and move back in with her. A young man trapped in cement after a dare has placed his health at risk, leading the doctors at Seattle Grace to sympathize and ease his pains. Cristina takes the lead in surgery. George confronts Webber and is allowed to retake the internship test. George later kisses Lexie in joy but is unaware that she is harboring feelings for him.

== Cast and characters ==
=== Main ===
- Ellen Pompeo as Dr. Meredith Grey
- Sandra Oh as Dr. Cristina Yang
- Katherine Heigl as Dr. Izzie Stevens
- Justin Chambers as Dr. Alex Karev
- T. R. Knight as Dr. George O'Malley
- Chandra Wilson as Dr. Miranda Bailey
- James Pickens Jr. as Dr. Richard Webber
- Sara Ramirez as Dr. Callie Torres
- Eric Dane as Dr. Mark Sloan
- Chyler Leigh as Dr. Lexie Grey
- Brooke Smith as Dr. Erica Hahn
- Patrick Dempsey as Dr. Derek Shepherd

=== Recurring ===
- Lauren Stamile as Nurse Rose
- Sarah Utterback as Nurse Olivia Harper
- Diahann Carroll as Jane Burke
- Jack Axelrod as Charlie "Really Old Guy" Yost
- Edward Herrmann as Norman Shales
- Kali Rocha as Sydney Heron
- Elizabeth Reaser as Rebecca "Ava" Pope
- Loretta Devine as Adele Webber
- Anjul Nigam as Dr. Raj Sen
- Jeff Perry as Thatcher Grey
- Debra Monk as Louise O'Malley
- Mark Saul as Dr. Steve Mostow
- Amy Madigan as Dr. Katharine Wyatt
- Cress Williams as Tucker Jones

=== Notable guests ===
- Kate Walsh as Dr. Addison Montgomery
- Mark Pellegrino as Chris
- Caroline Aaron as Connie
- Michael McGrady as Stanley Singer
- Miriam Flynn as Gretchen Bitzer
- Amy Hill as Joanne
- Dylan Minnette as Ryan
- David Denman as Rick Jacobs
- Matt Lanter as Adam Singer
- David Clennon as Jack Shandley
- Kurt Fuller as Jerry
- Seth Green as Nick Hanscom
- Gale Harold as Paramedic Shane
- John Billingsley as Jacob Nolston
- Alison La Placa as Mrs. Nolston
- Kimberly Huie as Mary Daltrey
- Nicole Cummins as Paramedic Nicole
- Theo Rossi as Stan Giamatti
- Cheech Marin as Otis Sharon
- Paul Dooley as Dr. Walter Tapley
- John Cothran as Ken Monroe
- Kathryn Meisle as Liz Monroe
- Jurnee Smollett as Beth Monroe
- Jana Kramer as Lola
- Sterling Knight as Kip

== Production ==
This is the last season to be produced by Touchstone Television, which was renamed to ABC Studios by June 2007. It was also produced by ShondaLand Production Company, and The Mark Gordon Company, whereas Buena Vista International, Inc. distributed it. The executive producers were creator and showrunner Shonda Rhimes, Betsy Beers, Mark Gordon, Krista Vernoff, Rob Corn, Mark Wilding, Joan Rater, and James D. Parriott, all part of the production team since the series' inception. The regular directors were Rob Corn and Jessica Yu. Producer Shonda Rhimes wrote 5 of the 17 episodes, 2 of which were along with fellow producer Krista Vernoff. Unlike the other seasons, except from the first one, which aired mid-season, the fourth season of Grey's Anatomy had a reduced number of episodes, due to the 2007–2008 Writers Guild of America strike, which caused the production to cease from February to April, leaving the show with no writing staff during that time. Since the show had only produced 10 episodes before the winter-holiday hiatus, and aired another one after the break ended, the show decided to complete the season with 6 new episodes, and returned on April 24, 2008. Only 17 episodes were produced out of the 23 originally conceived for the season.

After Kate Walsh's transition the Grey's Anatomy spin-off, Private Practice, her character left the show after a 2-year run. On June 7, 2007, it was announced that Isaiah Washington's contract had not been renewed. Former Reunion star, Chyler Leigh, guest starred in the final 2 episodes of season 3 as Lexie Grey, a new intern and Meredith Grey's younger half-sister. On June 11, 2007, it was announced that Leigh would become a series-regular, instead of a 13-episode story-arc as previously planned. The character Dr. Erica Hahn, portrayed by Brooke Smith joined the main cast, reprising her antagonizing role in the season's fifth episode. She replaces Preston Burke as Head of Cardiothoracic Surgery. Upon her return, she makes Sandra Oh's character, Cristina Yang work harder for her success in Cardiothoracics and initially served as a new love-interest for Mark Sloan, played by Eric Dane. Even though a new male character was originally thought to be introduced as a rival for Dr. Derek Shepherd, the change didn't occur. Former Dawson's Creek star Joshua Jackson was scheduled to make his return to television in a multi-episode arc as a doctor with his first appearance in the season's eleventh episode. Jackson's appearance was cancelled due to the 2007–2008 Writers Guild of America strike, and the storyline of the character he was supposed to play never aired on the show.

=== Casting ===
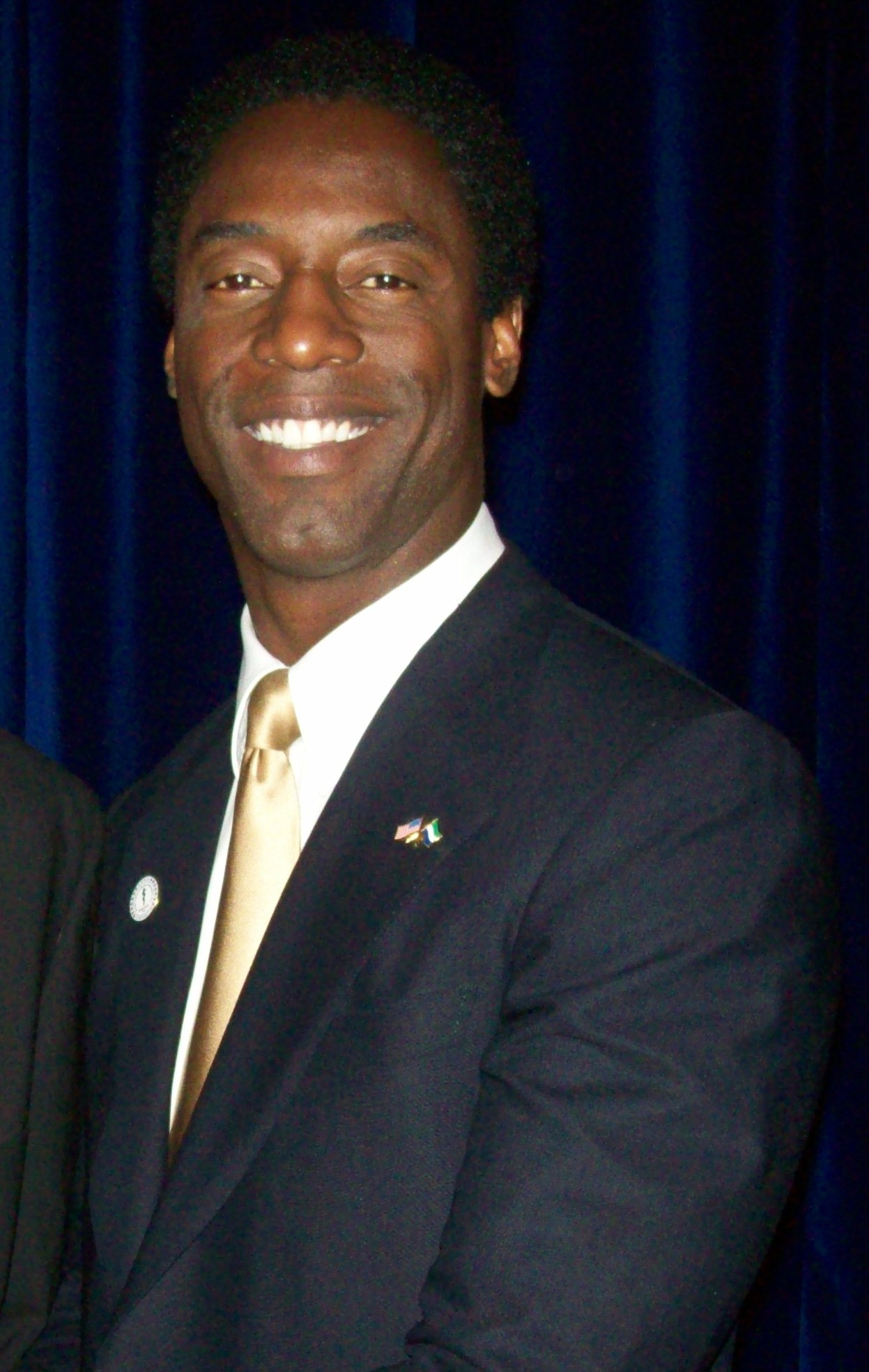
Washington was fired before the inception of the season, due to an alleged homophobic insult regarding Knight.

The fourth season had 12 roles receiving star-billing, with 10 of them returning from the previous season, 8 of whom are part of the original cast from the first one. All the actors who are billed as series-regulars portray physicians from the surgical wing of the fictional Seattle Grace Hospital. The majority of the show's episodes are narrated by Ellen Pompeo, who portrayed protagonist Dr. Meredith Grey, a surgical resident whose storylines are the series' focal-points. Sandra Oh acted as Meredith's best-friend, highly competitive resident Dr. Cristina Yang. Fellow resident Dr. Isobel "Izzie" Stevens was portrayed by Katherine Heigl, while Dr. Alexander "Alex" Karev was played by Justin Chambers. T. R. Knight acted as insecure resident with self-confidence issues, Dr. George O'Malley, whereas Chandra Wilson portrayed Chief Resident and general surgeon Dr. Miranda Bailey, former mentor of the 5 residents during their internship. James Pickens, Jr. portrayed attending physician and general surgeon Dr. Richard Webber, who continues his position as Chief of Surgery, despite his former wishes of retirement. Orthopedic surgeon and fifth-year resident Dr. Calliope "Callie" Torres, who was portrayed by Sara Ramirez, has to face her husband's unfaithfulness and her unexpected bisexuality. Attending plastic surgeon, Dr. Mark Sloan was portrayed by Eric Dane, who is constantly seeking reconciliation with former best-friend, attending physician and Chief of Neurosurgery Dr. Derek Shepherd (Patrick Dempsey), whose lasting relationship with Meredith Grey faces difficulties. Former Reunion star Chyler Leigh was promoted to series-regular status, after short appearances in the final 2 episodes of the third season, portraying Meredith's half-sister Lexie Grey, who opts for a surgical internship at Seattle Grace Hospital against Massachusetts General Hospital, after her mother's sudden death. Silence of the Lambs star, Brooke Smith was upgraded to series-regular status after multiple guest appearances in the second and third seasons. An antagonizing character at first, she replaces Preston Burke as the Chief of Cardiothoracic Surgery, constantly displaying disrespect for Cristina's previous relationship with him.

Numerous supporting characters have been given recurring appearances in the progressive storyline, including former Gilmore Girls actor Edward Herrmann who appeared in 3 episodes. Seth Green of Buffy the Vampire Slayer guest starred in 2 episodes, whereas Lauren Stamile portrayed nurse Rose, a love-interest for Derek. Former regular Kate Walsh appeared for the first time since her departure on May 1, 2008, receiving a special guest-star billing in the role of Addison Montgomery, now the main character of the spin-off Private Practice. Jeff Perry, Loretta Devine and Debra Monk reprised their roles as Thatcher Grey, Adele Webber and Louise O'Malley, respectively. Diahann Carroll and Elizabeth Reaser continued their season 3-introduced roles as Jane Burke and Rebecca Pope, respectively.

In October 2006, news reports surfaced that Washington had insulted co-star T. R. Knight with a homophobic slur during an argument with Patrick Dempsey. Shortly after the details of the argument became public, Knight publicly disclosed that he was gay. The situation seemed somewhat resolved when Washington issued a statement, apologizing for his "unfortunate use of words during the recent incident on-set." The controversy later resurfaced when the cast appeared at the Golden Globes in January 2007. While being interviewed on the red carpet prior to the awards, Washington joked, "I love gay. I wanted to be gay. Please let me be gay." After the show won Best Drama Series, Washington, in response to press queries as to any conflicts backstage, said, "I never called T. R. a faggot." However, in an interview with Ellen DeGeneres on The Ellen DeGeneres Show, Knight said that "everybody heard him."

After being rebuked by his studio, Touchstone Television, Washington issued a statement apologizing for repeating the word on the Golden Globes carpet. On January 30, 2007, a source told People magazine that Washington was scheduled to return to the Grey's Anatomy set as early on that Thursday for the first time since entering "executive counseling" after making the comments at the Golden Globes. However, on June 7, 2007, ABC announced it had decided not to renew Washington's contract, and that he would be dropped from the show. "I'm mad as hell and I'm not going to take it anymore," Washington said in a statement released by his publicist, borrowing the famous line from Network. In another report, Washington stated he was planning to "spend the summer pursuing charity work in Sierra Leone, work on an independent film and avoid worrying about the show." In a subsequent interview, Washington claimed that "they fired the wrong guy", referring to Knight, and said he was considering filing a lawsuit as a result. He accused Knight of using the controversy to bolster his own career and increase his salary on Grey's Anatomy. Washington, in late June 2007, began asserting that racism within the media was a factor in his firing from the series. On July 2, 2007, Washington appeared on Larry King Live on CNN, to present his side of the controversy. According to Washington, he never used the "F Word" in reference to Knight, but rather blurted it out in an unrelated context in the course of an argument "provoked" by Dempsey, who, he felt, was treating him like a "B-word," a "P-word," and the "F-word," which Washington said conveyed "somebody who is being weak and afraid to fight back." Washington himself said that his dismissal from Grey's Anatomy was an unfortunate misunderstanding that he was eager to move past. He later stated that if he were to be asked to make a cameo appearance on the show, he would not hesitate to say "yes." Washington's image was used in advertisements for the May 9, 2008 episode "The Becoming." After this aired, Washington's attorney Peter Nelson contacted ABC and Screen Actors Guild and cited this as an unlawful use of his client's image. His publicist, Howard Bragman, told The Hollywood Reporter that "they have the rights of the character to advance the story, but not the image" and stated he expected this to result in a "financial settlement", but it is still uncertain whether this ultimately happened.

== Reception ==
=== Ratings ===
The season was the second to air in the Thursday night time-slot, at 9:00 ET, after it was moved at the beginning of the third season, following 2 seasons in the Sunday night timeslot, as a lead-out to Desperate Housewives, which aired at 9:00 ET for its entire run. The season aired as a lead-out to Ugly Betty, then in its second season, which aired on Thursday nights at 8:00 ET. Grey's Anatomy averaged 15.92 million viewers in its fourth season, ranking #10 in viewership. The highest-rated episode of the season was the season premiere, with 20.93 million viewers tuning in and a 7.3 rating, ranking #3 for the week. The episode showed a decrease in ratings compared to the previous season premiere, which had almost 5 more million viewers tuning in and a 9.0 rating. The season premiere also attracted less viewers than the previous season finale, which was watched by 22.57 million viewers, and received an 8.0 rating Although "A Change is Gonna Come" attracted more viewers than Desperate Housewives's "Now You Know", which was watched by 19.32 million viewers, received a 6.7 rating and ranked #4 in the week, the episode was outperformed by CSI: Crime Scene Investigation's "Dead Doll", which aired in the same hour and ranked first in the week, with 25.22 million viewers tuning in and an 8.8 rating. The lowest-rated episode was the ninth, watched by 14.11 million viewers and ranked #14 in the week, with a 4.9 rating, seeing a sudden decrease, after the previous episode, the second most-watched in the season, which attracted 19.61 million viewers and received a 6.8 rating. "Crash Into Me: Part 1" was outperformed in the time slot by CSI: Crime Scene Investigation's "You Kill Me", the Thanksgiving special episode which attracted 14.75 million viewers and received a 5.2 rating, ranking #11 in the week. The season finale was watched by 18.09 million viewers, being the first-season finale of Grey's Anatomy to attract less than 20 million viewers. It was ranked #5 in the week, and received a 6.3 rating. There was a significant decrease in the number of viewers, compared to the previous season finale, which attracted almost 4 more million viewers and received an 8.0 rating.

The following table shows each episode's live + same-day DVR 18–49 key demographic rating, the live + same-day DVR viewership, and the live + 7-day DVR viewership.

Viewership and ratings per episode of Grey's Anatomy season 4
No.	Title	Air date	Rating/share (18–49)	Viewers (millions)	Total viewers (millions)
1	"A Change Is Gonna Come"	September 27, 2007	8.8	20.93	22.97
2	"Love/Addiction"	October 4, 2007	7.6	18.51	—N/a
3	"Let the Truth Sing"	October 11, 2007	7.9	19.04	21.11
4	"The Heart of the Matter"	October 18, 2007	7.3	18.04	20.30
5	"Haunt You Every Day"	October 25, 2007	7.4	18.18	20.51
6	"Kung Fu Fighting"	November 1, 2007	—N/a	19.31	21.60
7	"Physical Attraction, Chemical Reaction"	November 8, 2007	8.0	19.50	21.74
8	"Forever Young"	November 15, 2007	—N/a	19.61	21.67
9	"Crash Into Me (Part 1)"	November 22, 2007	5.1	14.11	16.63
10	"Crash Into Me (Part 2)"	December 6, 2007	—N/a	17.78	—N/a
11	"Lay Your Hands on Me"	January 10, 2008	7.1/17	17.68	19.62
12	"Where the Wild Things Are"	April 24, 2008	6.5/16	16.37	18.60
13	"Piece of My Heart"	May 1, 2008	6.1/16	15.31	17.52
14	"The Becoming"	May 8, 2008	6.4/16	16.03	18.17
15	"Losing My Mind"	May 15, 2008	6.1/15	15.55	17.74
16–17	"Freedom"	May 22, 2008	7.0/19	18.09	20.26

=== Critical response ===
Debbie Chang of BuddyTV.com expressed disappointment in the shows' development throughout the season, by stating it was "all about couples, jumping in-and-out of relationships, trying their darndest to have hot sex on the cramped, twin-sized bunk-beds in the on-call room." Chang also noted the little screen-time of characters Richard Webber and Mark Sloan, and the lack of romantic development in their storylines. Many critics negatively reviewed Izzie Stevens's development in the show's fourth season, particularly her affair with George. Katherine Heigl herself deemed their relationship "a ratings-ploy." Heigl explained: "They really hurt somebody, and they didn’t seem to be taking a lot of responsibility for it. I have a really hard time with that kind of thing. I’m maybe a little too black-and-white about it. I don’t really know Izzie very well right now. She’s changed a lot!" Laura Burrows of IGN stated the series became "a little more than mediocre, but less than fantastic" in its fourth season. She also said that "this season proved that even strong chemistry and good acting cannot save a show that suffers from the inevitable recycled plot." However, the episode "Physical Attraction, Chemical Reaction" received a positive review, with Burrows stating that it "fully encompassed all the things that make this show great: intense emotional drama and macabre OR activities." The Derek/Rose relationship received negative reviews, with Burrows stating that it was "emotional, but not remarkable." Jack Florey of IndieLondon reviewed the characters, stating that their behaviour is the show's biggest problem: "the self-absorbed, pretentious and frequently-selfish attitudes that drive the surgeons at the centre of Grey’s exasperate more than reward." As for the storylines, Foley stated that they didn't "ring true" and that "the plot devices became increasingly clunky", noting the lack of realism in arcs such as George and Callie's marriage and Izzie's affair "as a means of ripping it apart." Florrey also commented on Meredith Grey's arc, by stating that she turned into "one of the most selfish, self-centered characters on television", whereas Mark Sloan's storyline was named "sex-obsessed, borderline-misogynistic and close to scandalous." Daniel Fienberg of Zap2It said "One of the season's best performances came from Emmy-nominated guest star Elizabeth Reaser." Pajiba TV reviewed Reaser's performance by stating that it "has been one of the only good things that show's had going for it anymore." Entertainment Weekly called Reaser's performance as Ava the sixth most-memorable patient performance on the show. About.com stated that Alex Karev developed into "a bold and overly-confident surgeon."

=== Accolades ===
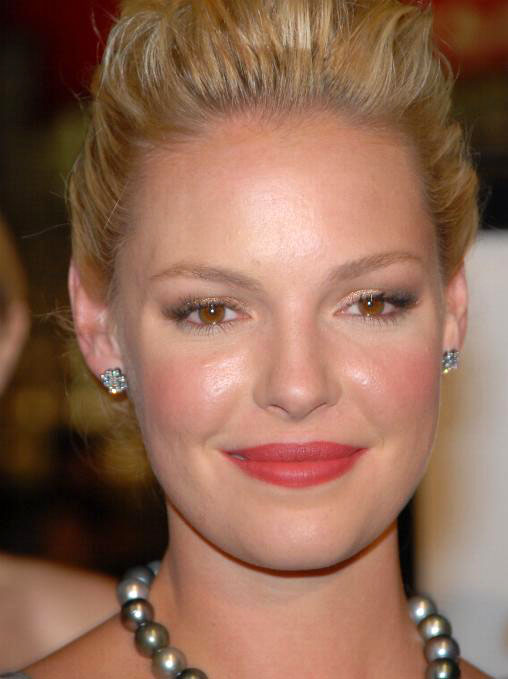
Heigl refused to be considered for the 2008 Emmy Awards due to insufficient material on Grey's Anatomy.

Several actors and members of the production team have been awarded for their work on the show during the season. At the 60th Primetime Emmy Awards on September 21, 2008, Sandra Oh was nominated for her performance as Cristina Yang in the episode "The Becoming", whereas Chandra Wilson received a nomination for her portrayal of Miranda Bailey in "Lay Your Hands on Me", both for the Outstanding Supporting Actress in a Drama Series. Katherine Heigl who portrayed Izzie Stevens declined to put her name forward for consideration at the Emmy Awards, claiming that she had been given insufficient material on the series to warrant a nomination. Diahann Carroll was nominated for Outstanding Guest Actress in a Drama Series for her portrayal of Jane Burke in "Love/Addiction." The make-up team, consisting of Norman T. Leavitt, Brigitte Bugayong, Thomas R. Burman and Bari Dreiband-Burman, was nominated for both Best Prosthetic Make-Up in "Forever Young" and Best Non-Prosthetic Make-Up in "Crash Into Me." Sara Ramirez's portrayal of Callie Torres was positively reviewed, resulting in the actor receiving a nomination at the 2008 American Latino Media Arts Awards. At the 65th Golden Globe Awards on January 13, 2008, the series was nominated for Best Drama Television Series, whereas Katherine Heigl's individual performance resulted in a nomination for Best Supporting Actress in a Television Series. At the 40th National Association for the Advancement of Colored People Image Awards, Chandra Wilson won Outstanding Actress in a Drama Series, where Shonda Rhimes was awarded at the Outstanding Writing in a Dramatic Series category, for "Freedom." James Pickens, Jr. also received a nomination for his performance as Richard Webber at the Outstanding Supporting Actor in a Drama Series category. At the 2008 Prism Awards, Justin Chambers was nominated for Performance in a Drama Series Episode, whereas Elizabeth Reaser received a nomination for Performance in a Drama Multi-Episode Storyline. At the Teen Choice Awards in 2008, Patrick Dempsey and Katherine Heigl were nominated for Choice Television Actor and Actress.

== Home Media release ==
The fourth season was officially released on DVD in region 1 on September 9, 2008, almost 3 weeks before the fifth season premiere, which aired on September 25, 2008. Under the title Grey's Anatomy: Season Four – Expanded, the box-set consists of episodes with Dolby Digital 5.1 surround sound and widescreen format. It also contained extras available only on DVD, including extended episodes, interviews with cast and crew members, footage from behind-the-scenes and unaired scenes cut from the aired episodes; in select DVD & Blu-ray sets of the season, a collectible Grey's Anatomy timeline chart was included. The same set was released in region 4 on November 5, 2009, after more than a year after its original release in the United States, whereas its first release date in region 2 was November 23, 2009. The DVD box set is currently #1074 in Movies and Television on Amazon.com and #1927 in Film and Television on Amazon.co.uk. The season was also released as a 4-disc Blu-ray box set in regions A and B.

Grey's Anatomy: The Complete Fourth Season – Expanded
Set Details		Special Features
17 episodes (2 extended); 5-disc set (DVD); 4-disc set (Blu-ray); 1.78:1 aspect ratio; English (Dolby Digital 5.1 Surround) (DVD); English (PCM 5.1 Surround) (Blu-ray); Subtitles: English, French, Spanish; Audio Commentaries; Runtime: 754 minutes		2 "Expanded" Episodes: "Forever Young"; "The Becoming"; Audio Commentaries on 2 episodes: “Forever Young” with Lauren Stamile and director Rob Corn.; “The Becoming” with Sandra Oh and director Julie Anne Robinson.; New Docs on the Block – Interview with Brooke Smith, Chyler Leigh and Lauren Stamile; On Set with Patrick & Eric – Behind the Scenes with Patrick Dempsey and Eric Dane; Good Medicine – Favorite Scenes; Dissecting Grey's Anatomy – Unaired Scenes; In Stitches: Season 4 Outtakes; One Quick Cut: Seasons 1-3 recap; Blu-ray exclusive features: Additional audio commentary on episode "A Change is Gonna Come" by actress Chyler Leigh and associate producer Karin Gleason.; Seasonplay feature
Release Dates
Region 1	Region 2	Region 4
September 9, 2008	November 23, 2009	November 5, 2008
