= Great Expectations (Grey's Anatomy) =

- Grey's Anatomy episode
- An episodic screenshot displaying Callie Torres and Cristina Yang sharing a moment of confessions before entering the operating room.
- Episode no.: Season 3 Episode 13
- Directed by: Michael Grossman
- Written by: Eric Buchman
- Original air date: January 25, 2007
- Running time: 47 minutes

Guest appearances
- Loretta Devine as Adele Webber; Rachel Boston as Rachel Meyer; Jessica Stroup as Jillian Miller; Joe Holt as Steve Beck

Episode chronology
← Previous "Six Days (Part 2)"	Next → "Wishin' and Hopin'"
- Grey's Anatomy season 3

"Great Expectations" is the thirteenth episode in the third season of the American television medical drama Grey's Anatomy, and the show's 49th episode overall. Written by Eric Buchman and directed by Michael Grossman, the episode aired on the American Broadcasting Company (ABC) in the United States on January 25, 2007.

The central storyline is the competition between department chiefs Derek Shepherd (Patrick Dempsey), Preston Burke (Isaiah Washington), Addison Montgomery (Kate Walsh), and Mark Sloan (Eric Dane) to fill the position of Chief of Surgery upon Richard Webber's (James Pickens Jr.) retirement. Further storylines include George O'Malley (T. R. Knight) mourning his father, Miranda Bailey (Chandra Wilson) trying to get financial support for a free clinic, Cristina Yang (Sandra Oh) dealing with her troubled relationship with Burke.

Although the episode is set in Seattle, Washington, filming took place in Los Angeles, California. The title refers to the song, "Great Expectations", by American hard rock band Kiss.

The episode was viewed by 21.50 million Americans upon its original airing, ranking first its time-slot and garnered a 7.6 Nielsen rating in the 18–49 demographic. It received mixed-to-positive reviews from television critics, with O'Malley's storyline receiving critical acclaim.

== Plot ==
The episode opens with a voice-over narration from Meredith Grey (Ellen Pompeo) about the pressures and expectations that come with becoming a surgeon.

George O'Malley (T. R. Knight) is seen using sex as a way to cope with the recent death of his father, Harold O'Malley (George Dzundza), which frustrates his girlfriend, Callie Torres (Sara Ramirez). Seeking advice, Torres turns to Izzie Stevens (Katherine Heigl), O'Malley's best friend. Meanwhile, news of Chief of Surgery Richard Webber's (James Pickens Jr.) retirement sparks a competitive race among Derek Shepherd (Patrick Dempsey), Preston Burke (Isaiah Washington), Addison Montgomery (Kate Walsh), and Mark Sloan (Eric Dane) to fill the position. In the midst of this, Cristina Yang (Sandra Oh) and Burke, who are romantically involved, are avoiding each other due to unresolved tension.

Miranda Bailey (Chandra Wilson), proposes opening a free clinic adjacent to the hospital. However, her idea is met with rejection from Webber and the attending physicians, who view it as impractical. Meanwhile, Jillian Miller (Jessica Stroup), a young woman admitted to obstetrics and gynaecology, is diagnosed with advanced cervical cancer. Her best friend, Rachel Meyer (Rachel Boston), opposes contacting Jillian's parents, revealing that the two ran away from their Amish community years ago. Stevens becomes emotionally attached to the case and urges Jillian to reconcile with her family.

A runner in orthopedics receives the devastating news that he will never race again following his surgery. Meanwhile, Sloan reveals plans to return to New York City, only to change his mind upon hearing about Webber's impending retirement. His decision angers Derek, sparking a heated argument between him and Meredith, threatening their relationship. At the same time, Webber seeks forgiveness from his wife, Adele (Loretta Devine), but is heartbroken to learn she has been spending time with another man.

Bailey ultimately finds a partner for her free clinic dream in Izzie, who enthusiastically offers to use her $8 million inheritance to fund the project. The episode concludes with significant developments: Yang, after confiding in Burke, is surprised when he proposes to her, while O'Malley, finally acknowledging how deeply his father's death has affected him, proposes to Torres.

== Production ==
"Meredith and Derek had their first fight as a real, honest-to-goodness couple. She's not used to fighting with someone and having them come back. We know how things are with her mom. We know her dad left even before she had a chance to ever fight with him. We can now picture every boyfriend she ever had leaving after just a couple weeks, if she didn't leave first."

— Buchman on Meredith's development

The episode was written by producer Eric Buchman and directed by Michael Grossman. Buchman explained that his main concept was to depict George O'Malley's grieving in a way that contrasted with how Izzie Stevens experienced her loss, yet would be emotionally challenging for both her and O'Malley's partner, Callie Torres. He elaborated, "We wanted Callie to feel some remorse. She finally got George, but not in the way she wanted. She's gotten his body, but the underlying relationship isn't there anymore."

Buchman initially planned for Cristina Yang and Preston Burke's cold relationship to be maintained by depicting silent sex between the two, but this idea was ultimately rejected as "boring, neither dramatic nor comedic" and not reflective of the characters' deeper emotions. The story arc involving the four attending physicians (Derek Shepherd, Burke, Addison Montgomery, and Mark Sloan) vying for the position of Chief of Surgery after Richard Webber's retirement was intended as comic relief, designed to highlight the more immature side of their personalities, a facet that had not been explored before. Additionally, Buchman described Webber's retirement as part of his attempt to reconcile with his estranged wife, Adele leading to his emotional devastation upon discovering that she had moved on with another man.

Buchman noted that the fight between Meredith and Derek was unique among the other storylines, as it involved "no more taboos". He explained, "Even though it was a minor fight, it's very revealing for Meredith. This is probably the longest relationship she's ever been in and the first with someone she feels a genuine connection with. We might know Derek will come back, but she doesn't." Their final scene together was considered "a milestone of sorts" for Meredith, as it forced her to confront the unfamiliar territory of a serious romantic relationship, contrasting with her previous years of excessive drinking and casual relationships with inappropriate men.

Regarding the aftermath of Alex Karev and Addison's kiss in the previous episode, Buchman commented, "What's most painful about that scene? Not that Alex effectively shut Addison down in such a cold and direct manner. But that it seems like such a waste of chemistry. When they went into that closet, the last thing we wanted to see them do was pour water on their fire." He noted that the scene was intentionally written to be "frustrating, shocking, and therefore unexpected."

== Release ==
"Great Expectations" originally aired on January 25, 2007, at 9:00 ET, averaging 21.50 million viewers and ranking third in weekly viewership with a 7.6 rating, according to Nielsen ratings. It was the sixteenth most-watched episode of the season, airing in the third week after the winter hiatus. Despite a strong viewership, the episode saw a slight decline in ratings, attracting approximately half a million fewer viewers than "Six Days (Part 2)", which received a 7.7 rating. "Great Expectations" remained the time slot leader, drawing one-fourth more viewers than CBS's juggernaut CSI: Crime Scene Investigation, which ranked fourth in weekly viewership with a 7.5 rating.

== Reception ==
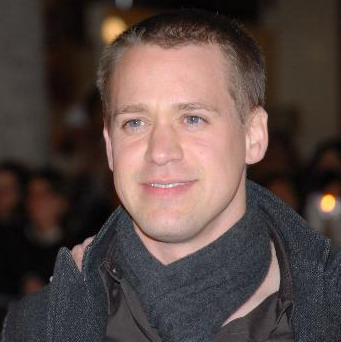
The mourning manner of T.R. Knight's character (George O'Malley) was deemed inappropriate by critics.

"Great Expectations" received mixed-to-positive reviews from television critics upon telecast, with George O'Malley's (T. R. Knight) storyline receiving critical acclaim.

Staci Krause of IGN had a mixed reaction to the episode, appreciating the development of personal storylines while finding the medical cases disappointing. She praised the storyline involving Cristina Yang and Preston Burke, describing it as "finally showing resolution, taking their relationship to the next level", and found Burke's marriage proposal to be a surprising and impactful moment: "It was shocking to see Cristina be the one to break, but even more shocking was Burke's two-word response: marry me. I'm really not sure why Cristina didn't just say yes, since two minutes before she had said she was in it for the long haul. It seems like they are dragging this out for the sake of dragging it out." Krause also highlighted Bailey's evolving role, particularly her interactions with the competing attending physicians, calling it "a reminder of why they called her the Nazi, something that was easy to forget with recent events."

Krause noted that Adele's revelation of moving on from Richard Webber was an "interesting twist with unexpected repercussions," but found Izzie Stevens' offer of money for the free clinic "the most predictable event of the episode". She critiqued the medical cases, stating that "it would have been nice to learn more about the severe dehydration that caused the runner's legs to swell." Krause also commented on the Amish storyline, describing it as an unexpected but "significantly helpful" addition to the episode's entertainment value, although the medical aspect lacked realism: "No one bothered to really mention that it would have been nice if it had been caught earlier." The tension between Meredith Grey and Derek Shepherd was characterized as "a tiff that Derek was entirely responsible for," but also a demonstration of "how damaged Meredith really is." Krause was also critical of George's proposal to Callie Torres, noting, "Callie certainly didn't look thrilled. If she believes George is proposing as a means to get over his grief, she's probably right and should likely run in the opposite direction." Regarding the race for Chief of Surgery, Krause found Mark Sloan's candidacy "hilarious, but a tad unbelievable" and questioned whether Addison Montgomery's relationship with Alex Karev might compromise her professional integrity.

"It was fantastic to see the mother forgoing the rules of shunning and giving the girl who left after being baptized a hug. While the Amish girl's personal story was well dug into, her medical case was left generally up in the air and the runner's case, both personal and professional, was merely glossed over. The writers definitely wanted to jam a lot of personal issues into this episode to the detriment of the medicine. Sure, the medicine is always secondary, but most weeks at least some effort is put into the semblance of medical mysteries."

— Staci Krause of IGN

Kelly West of Cinema Blend shared similarly mixed opinions, enjoying certain storylines more than others. She found Callie' attempts to leave George's room after their sexual encounter particularly entertaining, stating: "The look, or should I say, looks on Izzie's face as Callie rambled on about legs being bent the wrong way and needing to heal after too much sex were priceless." West praised the scene that saw Stevens and Bailey reach an agreement on the free clinic, calling it "a heart-to-heart in which she agrees to back off." She also expressed concern over Derek's behavior toward Meredith, describing his attitude as "unhealthy" for their relationship. West positively reviewed the storyline involving the attendings competing for the Chief of Surgery role, noting: "It was kind of funny to see the attendings act like the kids in the episode."

West found Bailey's storyline predictable, remarking: "He tells Bailey that it’s her who will eventually be Chief when she’s ready. Bailey's reaction could only be described as shock." She praised the Amish girls' storyline as "a touching and well-written side story," commending the realistic portrayals and how the arc impacted Izzie. West also highlighted the first interactions between Torres and Yang, noting how their personalities clashed initially but later bonded through surgery, calling it "an obvious parallel to the rest of the episode." Lastly, she compared Yang and Torres' reactions to their respective proposals, noting that while Cristina was "surprised and maybe a little bit touched," Callie exhibited concern, believing that George was proposing due to his unresolved grief over his father’s death.
