= Got to Be Real (Grey's Anatomy) =

- Grey's Anatomy episode
- Episode no.: Season 11; Episode 3
- Directed by: Rob Corn
- Written by: Zoanne Clack
- Original air date: October 9, 2014
- Running time: 43 minutes

Episode chronology
← Previous "Puzzle With a Piece Missing"	Next → "Only Mama Knows"
- Grey's Anatomy season 11

"Got to Be Real" is the third episode of the eleventh season of the American television medical drama Grey's Anatomy, and the 223rd episode overall. Written by Zoanne Clack and directed by Rob Corn, the episode aired on the American Broadcasting Company (ABC) in the United States on October 9, 2014.

The episode centers on Callie Torres (Sara Ramirez) as Owen Hunt (Kevin McKidd) introduces her to patients at the Veterans Hospital, hoping she will assist them using her robotic limb lab. Jo Wilson (Camilla Luddington) becomes increasingly jealous of the growing bond between Alex Karev (Justin Chambers) and Meredith Grey (Ellen Pompeo), leading to tensions in their relationship. Meanwhile, Maggie Pierce (Kelly McCreary) continues to confide in Richard Webber (James Pickens Jr.) as she navigates her new role at the hospital. Additionally, Alex and Miranda Bailey (Chandra Wilson) prepare to present their cases before the hospital board.

The title "Got to Be Real" refers to the song of the same name by Cheryl Lynn.

Upon its initial airing, "Got to Be Real" was viewed by 8.48 million Americans, ranked #18 in viewership, and garnered a 2.4/8 Nielsen rating/share in the 18–49 demographic. It received mixed-to-positive reviews from television critics, with praise for the performances of Pompeo and Chambers and the growing bond between their characters.

== Plot ==
The episode opens with a voice-over narration from Meredith Grey (Ellen Pompeo), reflecting on how vulnerability is essential to true strength and success, despite the risk of pain.

Callie Torres (Sara Ramirez) follows Owen Hunt (Kevin McKidd) through a Veterans' rehabilitation facility, explaining that she is only there to give a speech on residual limb health, as she is already overextended—balancing raising a child, trying to have another with Arizona Robbins (Jessica Capshaw), and Arizona’s new fellowship. Owen reassures her that she is just meeting a few veterans. They enter a room where several amputee veterans are gathered. Meanwhile, Alex Karev (Justin Chambers) prepares for his presentation to fill Cristina Yang's (Sandra Oh) vacant seat on the board, but is distracted by Meredith, who reveals, while in the shower, that Maggie Pierce (Kelly McCreary) is her newly discovered half-sister, causing Jo Wilson (Camilla Luddington) to feel jealous.

Meredith investigates and confirms through hospital records that Maggie is indeed her half-sister. Ellis Grey (Kate Burton) was unknowingly pregnant when she was admitted to the hospital after a suicide attempt. Simultaneously, Derek Shepherd (Patrick Dempsey) and Amelia Shepherd (Caterina Scorsone) clash over the position of Chief of Neurosurgery, leading Derek to reconsider his decision to remain in Seattle. Arizona grows concerned about balancing her new fellowship and the wounded veterans project with her desire to have another child, causing Callie to question their future together.

Richard Webber (James Pickens Jr.) attempts to tell Maggie that he is her biological father, but she reveals that she already knows and expresses frustration with him for not disclosing the information sooner. Meredith walks in and Derek asks about her day and how shes feeling and she says shes had a weird day and that she is drunk. Then Derek says you said you had to stay here to make the best out of your career. So i gave up brain mapping initiative so you can play hooky and get drunk with your friends? Is that why we are staying in Seattle?! And thats when Meredith realizes hes resenting her, for her decision to stay and not follow him.* Oct. 09 2025* Alex and Miranda Bailey (Chandra Wilson) compete for Cristina's open board seat, with Bailey presenting first, followed by Alex. Arizona later calls Alex back into the room, and shortly afterward, he exits and congratulates Bailey as he passes her. Arizona then calls Bailey back in, and the board congratulates her on securing the position, while Alex leaves the hospital.

== Release ==
"Got to Be Real" was originally broadcast on October 9, 2014, in the United States on the American Broadcasting Company (ABC). The episodes were watched by a total of 8.48 million viewers. In the key 18-49 demographic, the episode scored a 2.4/8 score and ranked 18 in viewership in the key 18-49 demographics.

== Reception ==
"Got to Be Real" received mixed-to-positive reviews from television critics, with praise for the performances of Ellen Pompeo (Meredith Grey) and Justin Chambers (Alex Karev) and the growing bond between their characters.

Entertainment Weekly gave a mixed review, praising Chambers' performance, stating, "What could have been the darkest and most dramatic face-off of the episode ended up being the most enjoyable, mostly because watching Alex adapt to being Meredith’s person—which means letting go of any sort of personal boundaries he might have—is fun, funny, and feels so very right." The review also highlighted Pompeo's performance, noting, "She’s not grateful that he’s home because her career is just as important as his. 'I’m the sun, and he can go suck it!' Ah, yes. A drunk Meredith is the best Meredith."

Fempop also lauded Pompeo’s performance, saying, "I can’t decide what my favorite scene of the episode is, which probably means it was an excellent episode. Like, do I choose Meredith drunkenly calling herself the sun and thus revealing years of pent-up insecurity? Or her uncapping the lid on her self-absorption jar to complain to Alex while he showers? Or maybe the part where she’s about to tell Derek about her sister but he’s being such a monumental McAss that she clams up like they’re stuck in Season 2." The review further praised Sara Ramirez's (Callie Torres) performance, adding, "The Callie/Owen Hunt (Kevin McKidd) screaming match gave me life. Finally, someone besides Cristina Yang (Sandra Oh) is putting him in his place. The hug, his confession, and her taking no shit later also helped."

TV Fanatic gave a largely positive review, stating, "There are so many shows that I keep watching out of loyalty. Grey's Anatomy is the exception. Even in its 11th season, I’m seriously still loving that Shonda Rhimes and Co. are totally bringing their A-game." The review also enjoyed the Meredith-Alex storyline, commenting, "I love seeing Meredith and Alex together, but I’m missing Jolex moments like crazy."
