= Didn't We Almost Have It All? =

- Grey's Anatomy episode
- An episodic screenshot displaying Burke leaving Cristina at the altar.
- Episode no.: Season 3 Episode 25
- Directed by: Rob Corn
- Written by: Tony Phelan; Joan Rater
- Production code: 325
- Original air date: May 17, 2007 (ABC)
- Running time: 53 minutes

Guest appearances
- Elizabeth Reaser as Ava / Rebecca Pope; Loretta Devine as Adele Webber; Chyler Leigh as Lexie Grey; Jason London as Jeff Pope

Episode chronology
← Previous "Testing 1-2-3"	Next → "A Change is Gonna Come"
- Grey's Anatomy season 3

"Didn't We Almost Have It All?" is the twenty-fifth episode and the season finale of the third season of the American television medical drama Grey's Anatomy, and is the 61st episode overall. Written by Tony Phelan and Joan Rater, and directed by Rob Corn, the episode originally aired on the American Broadcasting Company (ABC) in the United States on May 17, 2007. Running for 53:05 minutes, it is the longest single episode of the series, excluding two-part episodes. The episode title refers to the song "Didn't We Almost Have It All" by American singer Whitney Houston.

The episode marked the final appearance of Isaiah Washington as a series regular, playing Dr. Preston Burke. Washington would later reprise his role in the 22nd episode of Season 10 during Sandra Oh's (Dr. Cristina Yang) departure from the show. This episode also marked Kate Walsh's (Dr. Addison Montgomery) last episode with regular billing, as she transitioned to become the main character in Grey's Anatomy's spin-off Private Practice. Additionally, Chyler Leigh (Dr. Lexie Grey) made her last appearance as a recurring guest star in this episode before being upgraded to a series regular in Season 4.

The season finale was viewed by 22.570 million people and received an 8.0 Nielsen rating in the 18–49 demographic, ranking #3 for the week, just behind American Idol. It received polarized reviews upon its original broadcast; however, the performances of Oh and Washington received widespread critical acclaim.

== Plot ==
The episode opens to a voice-over narrative from Richard Webber (James Pickens, Jr.) about the heavy burden of responsibility as a leader and the personal sacrifices it demands.

Addison Montgomery (Kate Walsh) arrives at the ER with Joe (Steven W. Bailey) and Walter's (Jack J. Yang) surrogate, who had been at the bar in the previous episode. Preston Burke (Isaiah Washington) begins treating her and decides the twins must be delivered immediately. Meanwhile, Derek Shepherd (Patrick Dempsey), Mark Sloan (Eric Dane), and Miranda Bailey (Chandra Wilson) treat the newly discovered fourth climber from the mountain accident, while the other climbers are interviewed by the police. Cristina Yang (Sandra Oh) struggles with writing her wedding vows, so Callie Torres (Sara Ramirez) writes them on Cristina's hand. However, at work, Cristina learns that the wedding has given her the day off.

Jeff Pope (Jason London) arrives and hugs Rebecca (Elizabeth Reaser), reuniting with his wife. Alex Karev (Justin Chambers) confronts Jeff about why he didn't search for his wife earlier. Rebecca expresses her desire to be with Alex, but he encourages her to stay with her "decent guy" husband.

In another storyline, Derek tells Meredith Grey (Ellen Pompeo) that he met a girl at the bar, leaving Meredith confused. At the same time, Adele (Loretta Devine) suffers a miscarriage, revealing that Richard is the father of her child. Mama Burke (Diahann Carroll) pressures Cristina to remove her eyebrows for the wedding, which causes Cristina to panic and convince Bailey to let her scrub in for a surgery. Bailey agrees but later learns that Callie is named the new Chief Resident, much to her disappointment.

During the episode, Derek successfully removes the axe from the fourth climber while Burke delivers the twins. Meanwhile, Callie and George O'Malley (T. R. Knight) agree to have children, but Izzie Stevens (Katherine Heigl) confesses her love for George. The interns receive their exam results, but George hides the fact that he failed. Derek becomes frustrated with Meredith, feeling taken for granted, but Meredith avoids addressing the issue and goes to the chapel.

As Mark, Addison, and Burke learn they have been rejected as candidates for Chief of Surgery, Burke discovers that Derek is also not the new Chief. Addison encourages Alex to fight for Rebecca. Outside the hospital, Bailey and George have a heart-to-heart, with George confessing, "I failed you", accepting responsibility for his own failure.

Alex decides to pursue Rebecca, while Callie tells Izzie that she and George are planning to have a baby, leaving Izzie stunned. Cristina, realizing she scrubbed off her wedding vows during surgery, panics. Meredith convinces her to proceed with the wedding. However, Burke, noticing the delay and realizing that Cristina isn't ready, calls off the wedding, telling her he has been forcing her to change. He leaves, and Meredith announces to everyone that the wedding is over before walking away from Derek.

Later, Cristina returns to Burke's apartment to find that he has left. Overcome with emotion, Cristina breaks down, shaking uncontrollably. Meredith arrives to comfort her, helping her out of her wedding dress as she cries. Meanwhile, George meets the new interns, including Lexie Grey, Meredith's paternal half-sister. Richard tells Derek that he is the new Chief of Surgery, but Derek suggests that Richard should start over instead.

== Production ==
The First Baptist Church of Los Angeles is the place where the wedding was shot.

Following an off-screen incident in which Isaiah Washington directed a homophobic slur at gay actor T. R. Knight, ABC chose not to renew Washington's contract, making "Didn't We Almost Have It All?" his final appearance as a series regular. This episode also marked the last guest appearance of Chyler Leigh as a guest star, since she was promoted to series regular in the Season 4 premiere. Additionally, it was Kate Walsh's final regular episode, as she would only make guest appearances in the future after becoming the main character on the Grey's Anatomy spin-off Private Practice.

The wedding scenes in this episode were filmed at the First Baptist Church of Los Angeles, and Kenneth Pool designed the Amsale wedding dress worn by Cristina Yang (Sandra Oh).

=== Music ===
- "Roboxula" - The Jealous Girlfriends
- "Falling Or Flying" - Grace Potter
- "Hold You In My Arms" - Ray LaMontagne
- "Closer" - Coburn
- "Within You" - Ray LaMontagne
- "Eulogy" - The Hereafter
- "Explosions" - The Mary Onettes
- "Keep Breathing" - Ingrid Michaelson

== Release ==
"Didn't We Almost Have It All?" was originally broadcast in the United States on May 17, 2007, airing on the American Broadcasting Company (ABC) with a viewership of 22.570 million people and received an 8.0 Nielsen rating in the 18–49 demographic, ranking #3 for the week, just behind American Idol.

== Reception ==
"Didn't We Almost Have It All?" received polarized reviews upon telecast; however, the performances of Oh and Washington received widespread critical acclaim.

Maureen Ryan from the Chicago Tribune criticized the episode, describing it as "as overstuffed as a clown car at the circus". She felt the finale included too much padding, repetition, and characters being placed in unrealistic situations, such as Adele Webber's (Loretta Devine) pregnancy at 52. Ryan also found Derek Shepherd (Patrick Dempsey) arrogant and condescending.

Heather Havrilesky of Salon.com shared similar concerns, criticizing the timing of Shepherd's threat to break up with Meredith Grey (Ellen Pompeo) after all she had endured during the season. She questioned why Shepherd didn't end their relationship earlier, when Meredith first questioned it. Despite her criticisms, Havrilesky acknowledged the show’s strengths, such as its "snappy yet moving dialogue" and fast-moving storylines. However, she felt that the rapid plot developments were harming the show. She singled out Sandra Oh's performance as Cristina Yang as a highlight, calling it "fantastic" and "believable", and identified the moment when Cristina breaks down after returning to an empty home as the best scene of the finale.

Gregory Kirschling of Entertainment Weekly felt that, while the finale may have lacked a defining "happy, warm-gooseflesh moment", it was still well above average compared to regular episodes. He enjoyed Shepherd's speech to Meredith before the wedding, noting that the chemistry between the characters worked, but he found Meredith's non-response less romantic and felt it was time for the couple to be happy together. Kirschling also criticized Callie Torres (Sara Ramirez) being chosen as chief resident over Miranda Bailey (Chandra Wilson), but he praised Oh's performance, particularly during Burke’s breakup speech, which he called "so affecting". He described Cristina’s emotional breakdown at the end of the episode as "an amazing breakdown".

Andy Dehnart of MSNBC commented that the storylines were resolved "in mostly unsatisfying, occasionally depressing, and sometimes illogical ways", leaving the show "decidedly changed" by the end of the finale.
