= Corn (surname) =

Corn is a surname. Notable people with the surname include:

- Alfred Corn (born 1943), American poet and essayist
- David Corn (born 1959), American political journalist and author
- Kevin Corn, American voice actor
- Rob Corn (born 1955), American television producer and director
- Rudolf Corn (born 1943), German footballer

== See also ==
- Korn (surname)
