= Iorn =

Iorn may refer to:

- Iørn Piø (1927–1998), Danish historian
- Iørn Uldbjerg (born 1968), retired Danish football player

== See also ==
- Elizabeth Iorns (born 1980), New Zealand scientist
- Erin (female given name), for which "Iorn" is a rare variant
- Iron (disambiguation)
  - Iron, a metallic chemical element
- Jorn, people with the name
- Yorn, people with the name
