= A Hard Day's Night (Grey's Anatomy) =

- Grey's Anatomy episode
- The cast of the first season of Grey's Anatomy, excluding Justin Chambers, who plays Alex Karev, all of whom appear in the pilot episode.
- Episode no.: Season 1 Episode 1
- Directed by: Peter Horton
- Written by: Shonda Rhimes
- Original air date: March 27, 2005
- Running time: 43 minutes

Guest appearances
- Skyler Shaye as Katie Bryce; Randall Arney as Mr. Bryce; Kate Burton as Ellis Grey; Moe Irvin as Tyler Christian; Martin Ighani as Rectal Exam Patient; Billy Wood as Senior Resident; Josh Bywater as Intern No. 1

Episode chronology
← Previous —	Next → "The First Cut Is the Deepest"
- Grey's Anatomy season 1

"A Hard Day's Night" is the pilot episode and series premiere of the American television medical drama Grey's Anatomy, which first aired on March 27, 2005 on ABC. The episode introduces the main characters and surgical interns Meredith Grey (Ellen Pompeo), Cristina Yang (Sandra Oh), Izzie Stevens (Katherine Heigl), George O'Malley (T. R. Knight), and Alex Karev (Justin Chambers), as they begin their journey into the world of surgery at Seattle Grace Hospital. Other key characters introduced in the episode include Derek Shepherd (Patrick Dempsey), Miranda Bailey (Chandra Wilson), Richard Webber (James Pickens Jr.) and Preston Burke (Isaiah Washington).

On its initial airing, the episode garnered an American audience of 16.25 million viewers and received positive reviews from television critics. Peter Horton received a nomination for the Primetime Emmy Award for Outstanding Directing for a Drama Series for his work on the episode.

Like all Grey's Anatomy episodes it was named after a song, in this case "A Hard Day's Night" by the Beatles from the album of the same name.

== Plot ==
The episode opens with a voice-over narration from Meredith Grey (Ellen Pompeo) about embracing challenges and uncertainty by finding passion in your chosen path.

It chronicles the new surgical interns' first 48-hour shift at Seattle Grace Hospital. Meredith Grey (Ellen Pompeo) is shocked to discover that Derek Shepherd (Patrick Dempsey), with whom she had a one-night stand the night before, is not only an attending physician but also the Chief of Neurosurgery. The interns are introduced to their resident supervisor, Miranda Bailey (Chandra Wilson), nicknamed "The Nazi" for her strictness and serious demeanor. They also meet Richard Webber (James Pickens Jr.), the Chief of Surgery, and Preston Burke (Isaiah Washington), the head of Cardiothoracic Surgery, who catches the attention of Cristina Yang (Sandra Oh).

Meredith struggles with her first case, involving a teenage pageant contestant named Katie Bryce (Skyler Shaye), who suffers from unexplained seizures. Izzie Stevens (Katherine Heigl) initially dislikes Meredith, suspecting her of trying to get ahead by sleeping with an attending surgeon. It is revealed that Izzie previously worked as a model to pay her way through medical school, a fact that Alex Karev (Justin Chambers) teases her about.

George O'Malley (T. R. Knight) earns the nickname "007" (a reference to "license to kill") after botching his first surgery, an appendectomy. He inadvertently tears the bowel after pulling too hard on the sutures, and the patient is only saved by Burke.

It is also revealed that Meredith is the daughter of renowned surgeon Ellis Grey (Kate Burton), who had an affair with Richard years earlier while she was married to Meredith's father, Thatcher Grey (Jeff Perry). Ellis is now suffering from Alzheimer's disease, and Meredith secretly visits her at an assisted care facility.

== Production ==
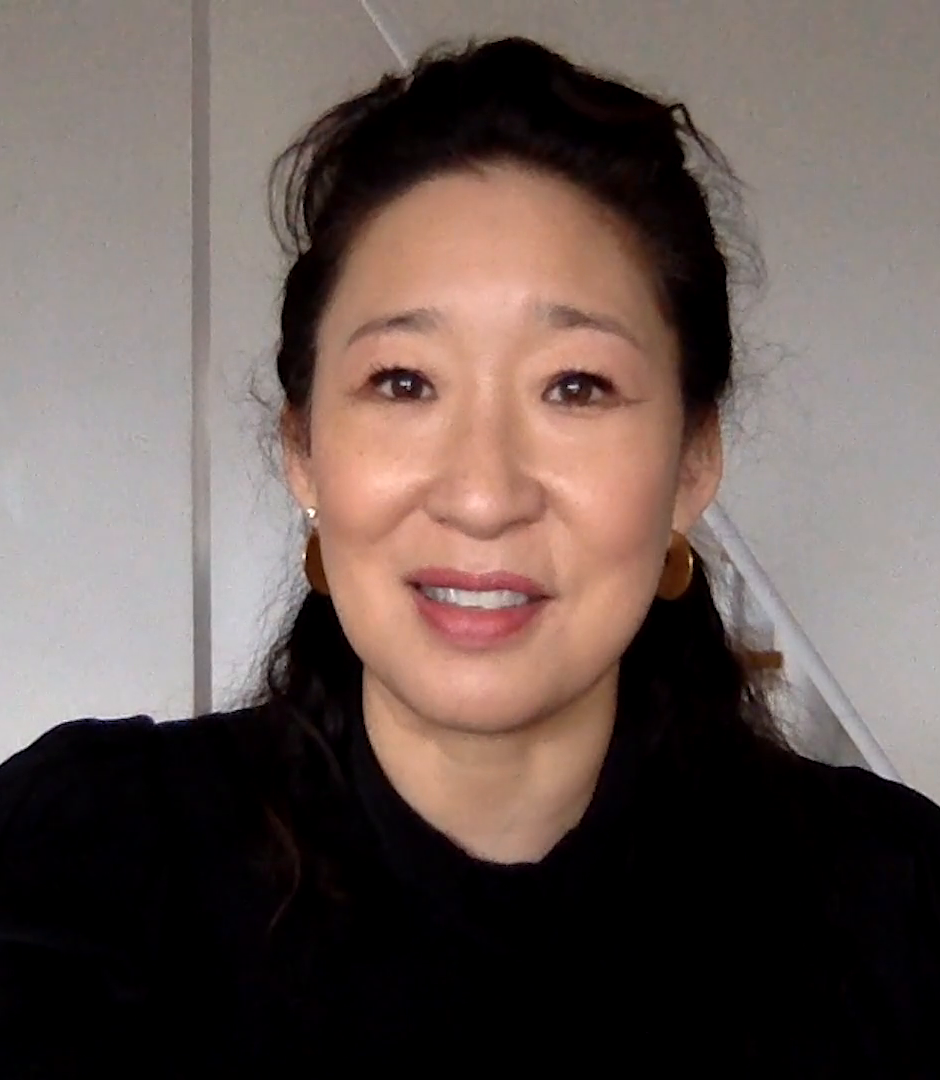
Sandra Oh originally read for the role of Bailey, but preferred Cristina, who was originally envisioned as an antagonist without power.

The voice-over that opens the pilot episode of Grey's Anatomy was not part of the original script. Shonda Rhimes explained, "In the editing room, it felt like a piece was missing, so we added it." Director Peter Horton had envisioned a different opening for the series, one he later regretted not using. Due to time constraints and Rhimes' desire to "start with a bang", they opted for a different approach. Horton recalled, "My original opening for the pilot was Ellen [Pompeo] lying naked on the couch. The opening scene of the pilot was Derek and Meredith having just slept together in a one-night stand. We had a very tight lens that was out of focus, going over all the curves of her body. You didn't even really know what it was as the credits were rolling. [Her body] would come into focus as her eyes opened. It was this beautiful description of Grey's Anatomy."

Stephen McPherson, then-president of ABC Entertainment, initially had little faith in the pilot and disliked the title Grey's Anatomy. At one point, he requested the show be titled Complications. After the producers turned in the pilot, McPherson halted production. Krista Vernoff, who was a staff writer at the time and later became the showrunner, recalled in an interview with The Hollywood Reporter 12 years later, "He hated it. He said to [then ABC executive] Suzanne Patmore Gibbs (1967–2018), 'This show is going to be the chapter in my book titled "Why I Should Trust Myself or Why I Should Trust People I Hire."' Because she forced that program on the air. And then it was a great big hit, and he got all the credit."

However, Rhimes raised concerns to writer Eric Buchman about the title Complications because Atul Gawande had written a book by the same name, which also revolved around a "young doctor working for a hospital for the first time". The network even optioned Gawande's book "just so they could officially use the title", but Rhimes later stated that she was not sure who made the call to return to the title Grey's Anatomy. Kate Burton, who portrays Ellis Grey, recalled that when she was called to audition, the working title of the show was Surgeons. Buchman also remembered someone pitching the title Miss Diagnosis, which Rhimes "just outright hated".

=== Casting ===
Justin Chambers was not part of the original Grey's Anatomy pilot episode, which was filmed in March 2004. Tony Phelan explained that one of the notes after testing the pilot was, "You need a bad boy. You need a male member of the intern class who's not just an asshole, but male." As a result, Phelan noted, "If you go back and watch the pilot, you can see how they surgically put Justin in everywhere."

The character of Preston Burke was initially conceived as Caucasian and intended to be played by Paul Adelstein, who would later star in Grey's Anatomy's spin-off, Private Practice. However, due to conflicting schedules with a film Adelstein was committed to, he had to drop out, and the character was reimagined. Isaiah Washington was originally considered for the role of Derek Shepherd, which ultimately went to Patrick Dempsey. Washington later received a callback from Shonda Rhimes to play Burke, and he recalled, "I knew I could never be wrong in my heart about something so good and so genuine. Her writing just seemed very complex, very honest." He added, "I said that I would only do it if I didn't have to be like that guy on that other medical show who was always struggling with his anger."

Stacy McKee, writer and later showrunner, revealed that the original script was an "unmakeable draft" and "too long", with a version of the script possibly portraying Burke and Richard Webber as related. Additionally, Ellen Pompeo, who was cast as the lead, Meredith Grey, was initially hesitant to join a medical drama. She shared, "I hate medical shows! They make me think I'm gonna die all the time"m but was encouraged to meet with Rhimes for lunch at Barney Greengrass in Beverly Hills. After their meeting, Pompeo stated that she liked Rhimes and trusted her vision.

== Reception ==
"A Hard Day's Night" received positive reviews from television critics upon broadcast.

ReviewStream.com gave positive feedback on the pilot episode of Grey's Anatomy, particularly highlighting the undeniable chemistry between Ellen Pompeo and Patrick Dempsey from their very first scene. Regarding Miranda Bailey's appearance, the site noted, "She's such a small woman, but wait until she speaks."

On the other hand, HomeTheaterInfo.com provided mixed-to-positive perspectives, acknowledging that the storylines bore similarities to the fellow ABC series Desperate Housewives, but also calling the pilot "brilliantly written, extremely well acted, and directed to near perfection."

The New York Daily News named Grey's Anatomy a "winner" following its first season, while Newsday expressed a similarly positive opinion, stating, "You simply can't stop watching."

== Awards and nominations ==
"A Hard Day's Night" was in competition for the Primetime Emmy Award for Outstanding Directing for a Drama Series, losing out to the pilot episode of Lost.

Year	Association	Category	Nominee	Result
2005	Primetime Emmy Awards	Outstanding Directing for a Drama Series	Peter Horton	Nominated
