= Yorn =

Yorn is a surname. Notable people with the surname include:

- Julie Yorn (born 1967), American film producer
- Kevin Yorn (born 1965), American lawyer
- Pete Yorn (born 1974), American singer, songwriter, and musician

== See also ==
- Corn (surname)
- Thorn (letter)
