= Preston Burke =

Fictional character from Grey's Anatomy

- Grey's Anatomy character
- The season 3 gallery photo of Isaiah Washington as Preston Burke
- First appearance: "A Hard Day's Night" (1.01); March 27, 2005
- Last appearance: "Didn't We Almost Have It All?" (3.25); May 17, 2007 (as series regular) "We Are Never Ever Getting Back Together" (10.22); May 1, 2014 (as guest star)
- Created by: Shonda Rhimes
- Portrayed by: Isaiah Washington

In-universe information
- Full name: Preston Xavier Burke
- Title: M.D. F.A.C.S.
- Occupation: Attending Cardiothoracic Surgeon; Head of Cardiothoracic Surgery (Former); Director of Cardiothoracic Surgery (Former); Chief Medical Officer (Former)
- Family: Donald Burke (father); Jane Burke (mother)
- Spouse: Edra Burke
- Significant other: Cristina Yang (ex-fiancée)
- Children: Miscarriage (with Cristina); Simone Burke; Vivianna Burke
- Religion: Christian
- Alma mater: Tulane University (BS); Johns Hopkins University (MD)

Preston Xavier Burke, M.D., F.A.C.S., is a fictional character from the medical drama television series Grey's Anatomy, which airs on ABC in the United States. The character was created by series producer Shonda Rhimes, and was portrayed by actor Isaiah Washington from 2005 to 2007. Burke is introduced as an attending cardiothoracic surgeon at the fictional Seattle Grace Hospital, and his romantic relationship with intern Cristina Yang (Sandra Oh) becomes one of the central storylines of the show during its first three seasons.

Burke made his final appearance in Season 3, leaving Seattle following the aftermath of his failed wedding to Cristina. In 2007, Washington was terminated from the show after he used a homophobic slur toward his co-star T. R. Knight during an on-set altercation involving Knight and Patrick Dempsey. On June 7, 2007, ABC announced that Washington would be dropped from Grey's Anatomy as a result of this incident.

Although Burke is mentioned occasionally in the seasons following his departure, the character makes an official return in Season 10 as part of the storyline concluding Cristina's departure from the series.

== Storylines ==
Preston Burke is the former chief of cardiothoracic surgery at Seattle Grace Hospital. He completed his pre-medical studies at Tulane University, where he pledged Kappa Alpha Psi, and graduated first in his class from Johns Hopkins School of Medicine. During his time in college, he met Erica Hahn (Brooke Smith), his rival who graduated just behind him, starting a long-standing competitive relationship. Burke once served as the interim Chief of Surgery while Dr. Richard Webber (James Pickens Jr.) recovered from brain surgery. However, Richard had originally promised the position of Chief to Burke but ultimately brought Derek Shepherd (Patrick Dempsey) to Seattle to create competition, believing Burke was becoming too arrogant.

Burke's most significant personal storyline revolves around his relationship with Cristina Yang (Sandra Oh). Although they initially broke off their romance due to fears of damaging their professional reputations, they rekindled their relationship after Cristina suffered a miscarriage. The two began living together, and Burke's structured, meticulous lifestyle clashed with Cristina's more chaotic approach, though they managed to make it work.

Towards the end of Season 2, Burke was shot, which impaired the control of his right hand—a major issue for a surgeon. To cope, he secretly relied on Cristina during surgeries, having her take over when his hand became unstable. This arrangement eventually unraveled when Cristina, under pressure from George O'Malley (T. R. Knight), confessed their secret to the Chief. This caused a rift between Burke and Cristina, though they reconciled after a period of silence, and Burke proposed to her, which she accepted.

Despite the excitement surrounding their engagement, Burke's injury temporarily jeopardized his career, but after a successful surgery by Derek, he recovered. As the couple prepared for their wedding, they experienced the usual stresses, including meeting each other's families. However, on the day of the wedding, Burke realized that he had been trying to change Cristina into someone she was not. In a moment of clarity, he called off the wedding, leaving Cristina at the altar and subsequently leaving Seattle. Cristina, returning to their apartment, found that Burke had taken only his personal belongings, leaving her heartbroken.

In Season 4, Hahn replaced Burke as the head of cardiothoracic surgery. Although Hahn respected Burke's skills, she held a disdain for Cristina, largely because of Cristina's previous relationships with Burke and Colin Marlowe (Roger Rees). Later, it is revealed that Burke won the prestigious Harper Avery Award in 2008. Cristina was deeply hurt when Burke did not mention her in his award-winning research, despite her critical role in helping him recover from his injury.

In Season 10, Burke reappears in Zurich, Switzerland where he runs a cardiothoracic research hospital. He invites Cristina to speak about her research, though she is initially angry and shocked to see him. They exchange bitter words, and Cristina admits that their relationship would never have worked because she had wanted to emulate him, not be his partner. Burke reveals his true reason for bringing her to Zürich: he offers her the chance to take over his hospital. He explains that he is moving with his Italian wife, Edra, and their two daughters, Simone and Vivianna, to Milan. Cristina accepts the offer, giving her a new and significant chapter in her career.

== Development ==
=== Casting and creation ===
"In the abstract, Burke was a more awkward and self-hating guy, a little bit of a weasel, but that was before Isaiah walked into the room. Isaiah played him as someone who intensely loves his job. He brought a sense of honor to what Burke does. And with Isaiah, suddenly there was a sexiness to the role, an intelligence and a wit."

— Rhimes on Washington's audition as Burke

The character of Preston Burke was originally envisioned as a Caucasian man, with actor Paul Adelstein, who later starred in Grey's Anatomy's spin-off Private Practice, slated for the role. However, due to scheduling conflicts with a film project, Adelstein had to drop out, prompting the show's producers to rethink the character. Isaiah Washington, who was initially considered for the role of Derek Shepherd (which went to Patrick Dempsey), was then called back by Shonda Rhimes to portray Burke. Reflecting on his decision to take the role, Washington commented, "I knew I could never be wrong in my heart about something so good and so genuine. Her writing just seemed very complex, very honest." He also noted that he only agreed to the role if it didn’t involve being the stereotypical "angry" character often seen in medical dramas.

Rhimes praised Washington's commitment to the role, revealing that he meticulously learned all the surgeries before performing them on screen. She remarked, "I think if he stopped at an accident on the street, he'd know exactly what to do. He has pulled shifts at hospitals where he follows the surgeons around for 48 hours." At the start of the series, Burke is one of the three African American characters, along with Miranda Bailey (Chandra Wilson) and Richard Webber (James Pickens, Jr.).

In the show's third season, Washington became embroiled in a highly publicized backstage controversy. In October 2006, reports emerged that he had used a homophobic slur during an argument with co-star Dempsey, directed at T. R. Knight (who portrayed Dr. George O'Malley). Following the incident, Knight publicly came out as gay. Washington initially apologized for his "unfortunate use of words" on set, but the issue resurfaced at the 2007 Golden Globes when Washington denied using the slur, even as other cast members corroborated the incident. Despite undergoing executive counseling and publicly apologizing again, Washington was let go from Grey's Anatomy in June 2007. Following his dismissal, Washington expressed his anger and disappointment, accusing Knight of using the situation to advance his career and increase his salary. He also claimed that racism within the media played a role in his firing, which he discussed in interviews, including an appearance on CNN's talk show Larry King Live, where he presented his side of the controversy.

Washington’s portrayal of Burke was highly regarded, and after his departure from the show, Burke remained a key figure in the series through his past relationship with Cristina Yang (Sandra Oh). In March 2014, Rhimes announced that Washington would return to Grey's Anatomy for a special episode in Season 10 to help conclude Cristina's storyline. Rhimes emphasized the importance of Burke in Cristina’s journey, stating, "It’s important to me that Cristina’s journey unfolds exactly as it should. Burke is vital to that journey -- he gives her story that full-circle moment we need to properly say goodbye to our beloved Cristina Yang."

=== Characterization ===
Washington described his character Burke’s evolution on Grey’s Anatomy as one of personal growth. He said, "He did start out sort of stone-faced, but he's evolved into someone we see as an effective leader and someone who learns how to love and be loved." Washington credited Burke's relationship with Cristina Yang (Sandra Oh) for allowing his character to show vulnerability, stating that thanks to Yang, "Burke has been able to show levels of vulnerability."

In an interview with Oprah Winfrey, Grey's Anatomy creator Shonda Rhimes described Burke as a "mama's boy", which became apparent to audiences when Burke's parents made an appearance on the show. This added a surprising layer to Burke’s otherwise serious and composed demeanor. Washington also highlighted Burke's "determination" and "commitment" as key traits of the character, showing his professionalism and dedication to both his career and his personal relationships.

Rhimes referred to the relationship between Burke and Yang using the portmanteau "Burktina," noting that the episode "Losing My Religion" was one of her favorites featuring the couple. She appreciated how the episode showcased their evolution from the beginning of the second season to its conclusion, reflecting on the complexity and depth of their relationship.

Ann Oldenburg of USA Today praised Burke and Yang’s relationship, calling it "one of the spiciest relationships on TV right now". She pointed out their contrasting personalities: Burke is "tidy" and "spiritual," while Yang is "messy" and less inclined toward spirituality.

== Reception ==
Isaiah Washington received multiple award nominations and accolades for his portrayal of Preston Burke. In 2006, he was part of the Grey's Anatomy ensemble that won the Satellite Award for Best Ensemble in a Television Series. Additionally, he was also part of the ensemble cast nominated for the Screen Actors Guild Award for Outstanding Performance by an Ensemble in a Drama Series from 2006 to 2008, with a victory in 2007. He also won the NAACP Image Award for Outstanding Actor in a Drama Series twice, in 2006 and 2007.

Burke's relationship with Cristina Yang (Sandra Oh) was highly acclaimed by critics and fans alike. It was regarded as "one of the most interesting relationships on the show", with The Orange County Register calling it "one of the most touching and funny attractions of Grey's Anatomy." Despite the positive reception of his character’s romance, Oscar Dahl of BuddyTV listed Burke as the "fifth most worthless TV character".
