= Rudolf Corn =

German footballer

Personal information
- Full name: Rudolf Corn
- Date of birth: 30 September 1943 (age 83)
- Place of birth: Saalfeld, Germany
- Height: 1.66 m (5 ft 5 1/2 in)
- Position: Forward

Senior career*
Years	Team	Apps	(Gls)
1962–1970	Olimpija Ljubljana	?	(29)
1970–1972	Stade Poitevin	19	(1)
- * Club domestic league appearances and goals

Rudolf Corn (30 September 1943) is a German footballer who spent most of his career in Yugoslavia.

== Club career ==
Born in Saalfeld, Germany, he played as forward or attacking midfielder. Corn spent most of his career with Slovenian club NK Olimpija Ljubljana where he played for eight straight seasons, between 1962 and 1970. The first three seasons he played in Yugoslav Second League, and, after Olimpija got promotion in 1965, the other five in the Yugoslav First League. He played with Olimpija in the 1966–67 Inter-Cities Fairs Cup. In 1970, he left Yugoslavia and moved to France where he played two seasons with Stade Poitevin.
