= Cristina Yang =

Fictional character in Grey's Anatomy

- Grey's Anatomy character
- First appearance: "A Hard Day's Night" (1.01); March 27, 2005
- Last appearance: "Fear (of the Unknown)" (10.24); May 15, 2014 (as series regular) "She's Leaving Home" (11.22); April 30, 2015 (body double)
- Created by: Shonda Rhimes
- Portrayed by: Sandra Oh

In-universe information
- Title(s): M.D. Ph.D.
- Occupation: Chief Medical Officer; Director of Cardiothoracic Surgery; Attending Cardiothoracic Surgeon; Board Director at Grey Sloan (9-10); Cardiothoracic Surgical Fellow at Grey Sloan (9-10); Cardiothoracic Surgical Fellow at Mayo Clinic (9); Surgical resident (4–8); Surgical intern (1–3)
- Family: Mr Yang (father, deceased); Helen Rubenstein (mother); Saul Rubenstein (step-father); Zola Shepherd (goddaughter); Sofia Robbin Sloan Torres (goddaughter)
- Spouse: Owen Hunt (m. 2010; div. 2013)
- Significant others: Preston Burke (ex-fiancé); Colin Marlow (ex-boyfriend); Jackson Avery (kisses); Shane Ross (ex-boyfriend)
- Children: Miscarriage; Abortion
- Religion: Judaism
- Alma mater: Smith College (BA); University of California, Berkeley (PhD); Stanford University (MD)
- Born: 1978

Cristina Yang, MD, PhD, FACS, is a fictional character from the medical drama television series Grey's Anatomy, which has aired for 22 seasons on the American Broadcasting Company (ABC) in the United States. The character was created by series producer Shonda Rhimes, and is portrayed by actress Sandra Oh. Introduced as a surgical intern at the fictional Seattle Grace Hospital, Yang worked her way up to resident level, eventually becoming a cardiothoracic surgical fellow, while her relationships with colleagues Meredith Grey (Ellen Pompeo), Izzie Stevens (Katherine Heigl), Alex Karev (Justin Chambers) and George O'Malley (T. R. Knight) formed a focal point of the series. Earlier in the series, Yang got engaged to Preston Burke (Isaiah Washington), in the past had a relationship with renowned surgeon and mentor Colin Marlow (Roger Rees), and married but later divorced Owen Hunt (Kevin McKidd).

Oh originally auditioned for the role of Miranda Bailey, although Chandra Wilson was ultimately cast in the part. Oh received widespread critical acclaim for her portrayal, with Mark Perigard of the Boston Herald considering her friendship with Meredith to be "the secret-core of Grey's". Oh has also garnered numerous awards and nominations for her role as Yang, including Golden Globe and Screen Actors Guild Award wins in 2006. She was additionally nominated for the Primetime Emmy Award for Outstanding Supporting Actress in a Drama Series each year, from 2005 to 2009. Characterizing the character, ABC noted her competitiveness, ambition, and intelligence as her main traits, and her aggressive and tactless attitude as her main weakness. In May 2012, E! Online reported that Oh had signed on for two more years, along with her fellow cast members. Oh left the show after season 10, and her character Cristina Yang was written out of the storyline as a main cast member.

== Storylines and character ==
Cristina Yang is introduced as a graduate from Stanford University and a fellow surgical intern to Meredith Grey (Ellen Pompeo), Izzie Stevens (Katherine Heigl), Alex Karev (Justin Chambers) and George O'Malley (T. R. Knight). They work under resident Miranda Bailey (Chandra Wilson). Yang is of Korean-American ancestry. She has dyslexia. She first desired to become a doctor after a childhood car accident which killed her biological father. Yang was raised in Beverly Hills, California by her mother and supportive Jewish stepfather. She used to be an atheist. She has a B.A. from Smith College, an M.D. from Stanford University and a Ph.D. from University of California, Berkeley. While many view her as a cutthroat "robot", Cristina becomes close friends with Meredith, who shares her sense of humor and outlook on life.

During her internship, Cristina has an on-and-off relationship with the chief of cardiothoracic surgery Preston Burke (Isaiah Washington) that leads to an accidental pregnancy. Yang secretly schedules an abortion but, before she can get it, suffers an ectopic pregnancy and a burst fallopian tube. Burke gets shot after a shooting at the hospital and is left with a hand tremor, so Yang performs surgeries on his behalf. She is confronted by Richard Webber (James Pickens Jr.), the chief of surgery, and confesses to doing this. Burke, feeling betrayed by her confession, breaks up with her temporarily but proposes marriage, which Yang accepts after eight days. On the wedding day, Burke leaves her because he was not sure if she was ready to commit. Yang goes on a honeymoon to Hawaii with Meredith to recover, returning to discover that Burke has transferred to a different hospital.

Burke is replaced by Erica Hahn (Brooke Smith), who dislikes Yang for her affairs with other surgeons. Eventually, Callie Torres (Sara Ramirez) moves in with Yang, and Yang still tries to earn Hahn's approval. Hahn reveals that Yang reminds her of her younger self, hence her resentment of Yang; Hahn quits the hospital, leaving Seattle Grace's head of cardio position vacant. Yang becomes depressed when Seattle Grace falls to twelfth on a list of the best teaching hospitals, and Burke wins the Harper Avery award without mentioning her at all.

Yang meets Owen Hunt (Kevin McKidd), an army trauma surgeon, when he patches her up after an icicle stabs her in the abdomen outside the hospital. After his honorable discharge, Hunt is hired as Seattle Grace's chief of trauma surgery, and he and Yang begin a relationship. Hunt's PTSD, inflicted during his time in Iraq, causes him to attack and strangle her in his sleep. Yang, despite wanting to support Hunt, ends their relationship, as she is afraid of sleeping next to him. Yang is disciplined for failing to report the new interns' irresponsible behaviour; she loses her chance at becoming the first resident to perform a surgery alone, even though the attending surgeons chose her unanimously. Cristina chooses Alex to replace her. Yang and Grey argue about the scandal, but reconcile. Because of Yang's ability to remain emotionally distant, Izzie confides in her about her cancer diagnosis. Yang saves Izzie's life by coming up with a treatment plan and forcing Izzie to tell their friends of her diagnosis. Hunt begins seeing a therapist and rekindles his relationship with Yang, but frequently ignores or penalizes her to avoid the appearance of favoritism.

Hunt hires ex-colleague from the Army, Teddy Altman (Kim Raver), to become the chief of cardiothoracic surgery as a "gift" for Yang, after she breaks down over having no new head of cardio. Altman resigns after getting feelings for Hunt. Yang begs Altman to stay and teach her, offering Hunt to Altman in exchange. Hunt breaks up with Yang. After Derek is shot during a mass shooting at the hospital, Cristina, held at gunpoint, saves Derek's life. Grey operates on Hunt, who is also injured in the shooting. Afterward, Yang and Hunt impulsively marry; Yang, who developed PTSD after the shooting, wanted to marry Hunt because he understood her condition.

Yang, unable to work due to her PTSD, quits and gets a job as a bartender, but returns to work after helping a school shooting victim. Yang gets an abortion after becoming pregnant with Hunt's child. Though Hunt accompanies her, he is extremely angry with her decision. Yang then operates unknowingly on Henry Burton (Scott Foley), Altman's husband; he dies during the surgery. Yang is guilt-stricken upon learning of her patient's identity. Altman forgives Yang and forces her to realize that she did everything possible. Altman acts as a mentor to Yang, and, before her resignation, lets Yang create a wish list of surgeries she wants to fulfill.

Yang and Hunt distance themselves from each other over the abortion. Hunt has a one-night stand with a patient's friend. Yang leaves Hunt. Near the end of the fifth year of residency, the surgical residents prepare for their medical boards and for the different fellowships they plan on joining. After she passes her exams, Yang reconciles with Hunt. Yang, Meredith, Derek, Mark Sloan (Eric Dane), Lexie Grey (Chyler Leigh) and Arizona Robbins (Jessica Capshaw) are involved in an aviation accident while on the way to Boise, Idaho to perform surgery on conjoined twins. Lexie dies, and Mark succumbs to his injuries after they are rescued. After the accident, Yang has brief reactive psychosis, which provokes violent outbursts and makes her unresponsive. Yang leaves Seattle to become a cardiothoracic surgical fellow and goes to the Mayo Clinic in Minnesota, but has difficulties adapting to her new workplace. Yang befriends a near-retirement cardio surgeon, Craig Thomas (William Daniels), and begins an affair with the head of surgery Dr. Darren Parker (Steven Culp). After Thomas dies from a heart attack, Yang returns to Seattle.

Cristina is re-hired and Owen asks for a divorce once Cristina wants to reconcile. Shocked, Cristina agrees, but later finds out that the potential conflict of interest regarding the plane crash lawsuit was a key motive behind Owen's request and confronts him. Owen tells her that he 'feels responsible' and was worried as he thought she was dead. They have a sexual relationship after divorcing. The hospital is sued and found guilty of negligence. The surviving doctors, including Yang, must receive $15 million of compensation each, which leads the hospital to a near-bankruptcy as the insurers refuse to pay. Yang, Callie Torres (Sara Ramirez), and the other surviving doctors buy the hospital with the help of the Harper-Avery Foundation to prevent it from closing, and each become members of the new directing board. After buying the hospital, Yang separates from Owen, because he wants children whereas she does not.

After breaking up with Owen, Cristina becomes the de facto chief of cardio. Cristina tells Meredith that becoming a mother has hurt Meredith's career and clinical judgment, damaging their friendship. Grey attempts to catch up professionally with a research trial, but the divide widens when Cristina's trial overshadows Grey's. When Dr. Shane Ross, a second-year resident, stands up to Meredith for her, Cristina begins sleeping with him and also becomes his mentor. Cristina's project succeeds, and she is told she may earn the Harper Avery award for 3-D printing a heart conduit. Grey and Yang reconcile when Grey acknowledges that Yang has surpassed her. Cristina is nominated for the Harper Avery award but is passed over because the Harper-Avery Foundation co-owns the Grey-Sloan Memorial Hospital. Cristina speaks at a hospital in Zurich, Switzerland; Burke offers Cristina his job as the head of the hospital so that he can spend more time with his family.

Cristina accepts the offer, transfers her hospital shares to Alex Karev and recommends he take over her seat on the board. At the end of Season 10, Cristina bids farewell to her colleagues and leaves for Zurich with Shane Ross, who will study under her at her new research hospital in Switzerland. She is last seen from behind at Derek's funeral in Season 11, sitting with Meredith. In Season 14, intern Sam Bello is sent to Zurich to study under Cristina so that she can escape ICE. In Season 16, Meredith gets text messages from Cristina saying she has given her a "gift": the new pediatric surgeon, Cormac Hayes (Richard Flood), affectionately called McWidow, who becomes Meredith's love interest.

== Development ==
=== Casting & creation ===
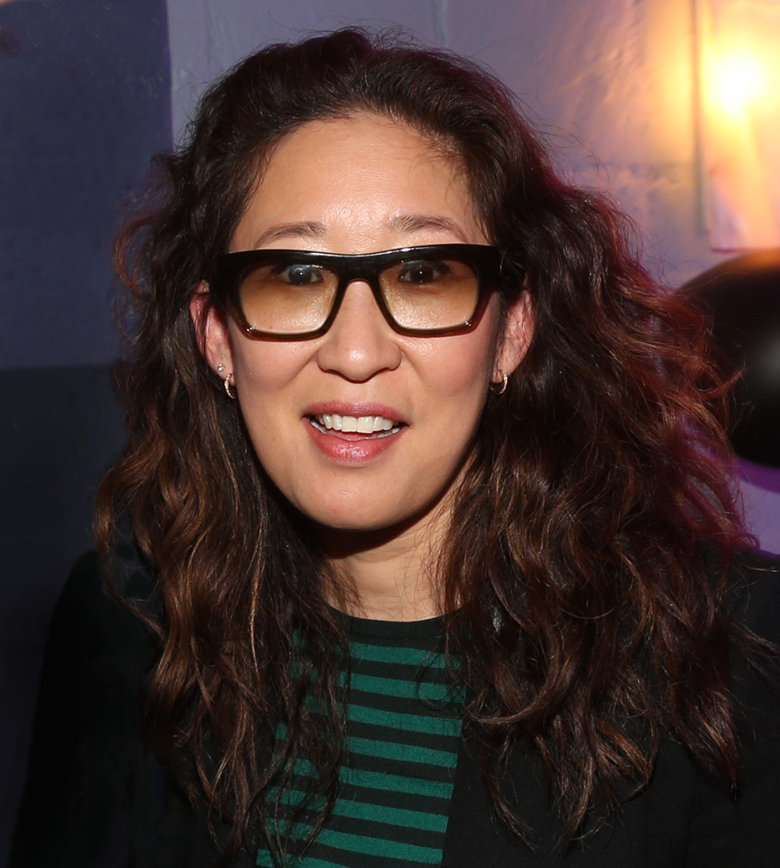
Sandra Oh's character was not supposed to be of Asian descent.

On the creation of Yang, Shonda Rhimes said the character contained "a little bit of [her] personality". Speaking with talk show host Oprah Winfrey, Rhimes said: "Cristina was second, simply because she's the kind of woman I know really well, and I like her. There's something interesting about a person who is that driven, a little bit emotionally disconnected, but still a caring, sweet, and smart individual you could be friends with." Sandra Oh, initially auditioned for the character of Bailey, adding: "Thank God I did not get that part", explaining the show would not be the same without fellow cast member, Wilson. Discussing casting Oh as Yang, Rhimes said: "She brought this energy that felt very fresh. From the beginning, I've been shaping Cristina around Sandra a little bit. One of my favorite things to do is take as much of her dialogue out of a scene as possible because she does so much nonverbally. Then I just watch what she manages to do without having a word to say."

The character of Yang was not originally supposed to be of Asian descent. Oh said her character was "a pert little blonde and the thing is the woman who runs the show, Shonda Rhimes, is a black woman, which makes a big fucking difference." In 2009, when asked why Oh signed on for Grey's Anatomy, Oh said:

"I'm very proud of this show and I think it came along at the right time for me. It's a changing time on television because 5 or 10 years ago you wouldn't have a major network show where half of the cast were not white." Oh's original contract with the show expired after season 8, however, E! Online reported in May 2012, that Oh, as well as all original cast members, had signed on for 2 more years.

=== Characterization ===
The American Broadcasting Company (ABC) characterized Yang as "competitive", "ambitious", and "intelligent", while also noting her weaknesses: "bossy", "aggressive", and "tactless". Oh said of her character: "I've always tried to play Cristina with a tremendous amount of focus and ambition—which is the reality for a female surgeon. I mean, in real life there aren't many of them. But the ones you encounter are at the very top of their game. You have to have a kind of ascetic personality to survive." James Pickens Jr. who portrays Dr. Webber said: "That character itself set a bar in terms of how we look at millennial women: independent yet vulnerable, seriously competitive yet caring." Rhimes referred to Yang's relationship with Burke by the portmanteau "Burktina", citing "Losing My Religion" as one of her favorite episodes featuring them because it shows their evolution from the beginning of the second season to its end.

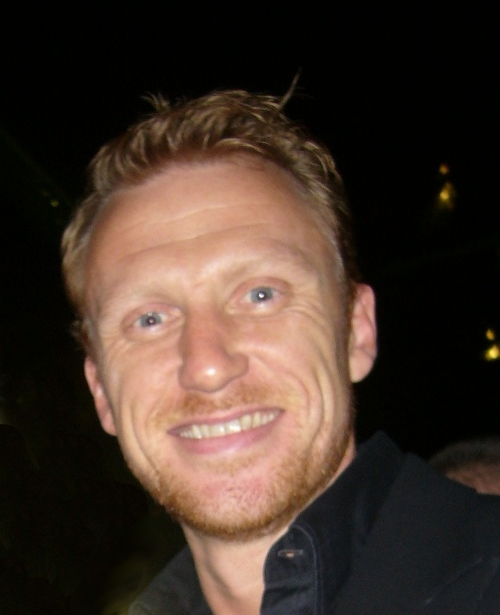
Kevin McKidd's character was introduced as a love-interest for Yang in season 5.

Rhimes commented, "[We see] her struggle to suppress all of her humanity in pursuit of perfection. And in my mind, what we realize is that she is not cold. She is terrified. Scared that if she lets her emotions out, they will overtake her and she will be hurt. And you can't hate her. Because it's so incredibly human and understandable." Yang's friendship with Meredith has been looked upon as "sisterhood", and Yang has repeatedly referred to the former as "her person". This led to the two being dubbed "the twisted sisters". At the conclusion of season 3, the duo went on a "honeymoon" together, and Rhimes called it her favorite detail of the finale.

New York magazine wrote of the character: "There's probably no woman on TV right now more single-mindedly dedicated to her career than Cristina. It has long been her defining characteristic. If it occasionally makes her into a caricature, it has also unquestionably established that she would have an abortion in this circumstance." Talking about Yang's abortion in the eighth season, Rhimes explained she intended Yang to have an abortion already in the second season but changed it with an ectopic pregnancy at the suggestion of one of her writers because "that was so much more interesting, story-wise". As for the abortion in the eighth season, Rhimes commented: "I really wanted Cristina Yang to stay true to who Cristina Yang is. And I feel like that is a character who has never really wanted to be a mother. The idea that this woman would have a child that she did not want and resented for ruining her career and resented Owen for making her have [it] would have been hideous. [The abortion] made sense for the character."

Discussing his onscreen relationship with Yang, McKidd said: "It's not going to be easy for them. What I read when I read the season premiere, and this is just my take on it, is that it was very much two very analytical people, Owen and Cristina. They're very similar in a way, I think, as people. Two analytical people see each other over a crowded ER room and their eyes meet." On the topic of Yang's triumphs and challenges in the eighth season, Oh said: "It has been an extremely challenging year that has had a lot of ups and downs, both challenging and exhilarating. We would shoot all our scenes for a day or two straight, and that was extremely challenging because emotionally and physically it becomes really exhausting."

Oh said of Yang's expressions of emotions during season eight: "You see her express her emotions with only two people: her best-friend Meredith and her husband Owen. To see someone being pulled apart so intensely, which honestly most everyone goes through in their life in some ways, if you're lucky you're completely pulled apart and then you have to pull yourself together, which hopefully will be the exploration within hopefully the next season." Although the characters' marriage is tested, McKidd reported to The Hollywood Reporter: "I think they're meant for each other. I hold out faith in Cristina and Owen, even though they go to the darkest places out of all the couples on the show. It's going to get worse but it's going to get better soon."

== Reception ==
=== Reviews ===
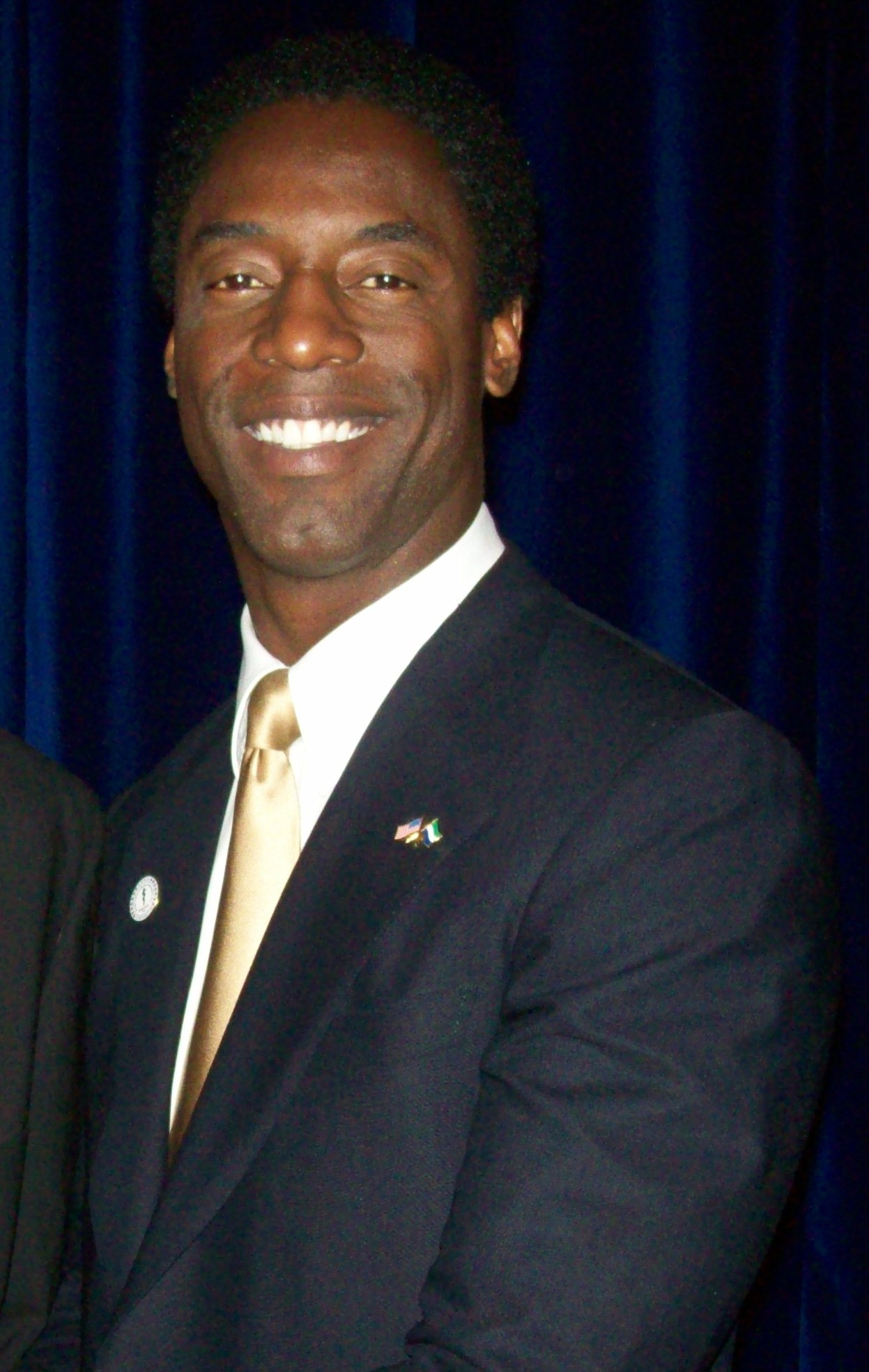
Isaiah Washington's character's relationship with Yang was highly acclaimed.

The character received positive reviews from critics at the time of its inception and as the series went on, the reviews turned to widespread acclaim, with Yang going on to become an iconic character not just for Grey's, but for television itself. Kelli Catana of The Huffington Post named Yang "the best damn character" of the series. Yang appeared in Comcast's list of "TV's Most Intriguing Characters", with the website commenting that she is "an engaging, yet comedic factor for the prime-time soap Grey's Anatomy." Philadelphia Magazine included Yang in its list of the "10 Best Doctors on Television". However, the same periodical listed her as one of "The 12 Most Annoying Women on TV". Mark Perigard of the Boston Herald considers her friendship with Meredith to be "the secret core of Grey's and perhaps creator Shonda Rhimes' greatest contribution to primetime." The Huffington Post's writer Kelli Catana agreed, saying: "the Meredith Grey/Cristina Yang relationship is probably the most true friendship on network television." Their friendship was listed in AOL TV's "Top 20: TV's Best BFFs" and in Entertainment Weekly's "30 Best TV Bromances/Gal Pals". Yahoo! Voices also put Yang on their list of "The Most Loyal TV Best-Friends of All Time". Television Without Pity writer Lauren Shotwell claimed Yang is "the only one of these five [residents] that regularly acts like an actual doctor".

Yang's relationship with Burke was highly acclaimed; it was considered "one of the most interesting relationships on television". Similarly, The Orange County Register wrote that their romance became "one of the most touching and funny attractions of Grey's Anatomy." Christopher Monfette of IGN was critical of their wedding planning in the third season, saying: "The will-they's and won't-they's fly and fall like hobbled pigeons until the season finale when the show solves both its personal and professional problems in the most obvious and least compelling of ways." UGO.com placed their break-up on its list of "The Most Horrible TV Breakups". In 2009, Monfette said of Yang's relationship with Hunt: "[Hunt's] interactions with Yang were perfectly balanced for optimum drama, never together and never apart for so long that the back-and-forth became frustrating. Viewers could clearly see a softening of the typically hard-edged Yang, a pleasant change for what had become something of a one-note character."

Jennifer Armstrong of Entertainment Weekly also praised the pairing, especially in "Elevator Love Letter", saying: "As good as they've been at amping up the romance crackling between Cristina and Owen, Sandra Oh and Kevin McKidd brought the Emmy consideration tonight from scene 1." She also added: "I loved seeing Cristina at least try to stand by her man." Of Yang and Hunt's wedding, Armstrong said: "Glad we made a clean disposal of the Cristina-Owen-Teddy love-triangle, though, when he quipped to Teddy, "I heard there's a guy," and she said she was happy for him." She also praised Owen's proposal scene, giving it an "A". Later, she praised their marriage, saying: "I am absolutely loving the stronger-than-ever lady-bond between these two this season. Is it because they're both married now? Just growing up? Whatever, it's the opposite of Blair and Serena's annoyingly fickle frenemy status on Gossip Girl, and I can't get enough."

New York Magazine praised the abortion storyline, saying that the show "was brave enough to do what almost no other series will: show this one particular, totally legal medical procedure on TV" and that the abortion was "the only plausible resolution" for Yang's pregnancy. Tanner Stransky, also of Entertainment Weekly, said of Yang's actions after Owen's affair: "It alternately seems silly and not silly, when you really think about it." Robert Bianco of USA Today praised Yang's storylines in the eighth season, saying: "Their stories are effectively tied into that of a patient whose ability to move forward is complicated by a complex response to a hideous past." HitFix writer Liane Bonin Starr applauded Yang's brief departure from Seattle Grace to Mayo Clinic in season 9, which was "interesting" as "it showed us a new side of her—and after so many seasons, that was some welcome insight."

The relationship between Meredith and Cristina has been highly acclaimed and been a highlight of the show. Mark Perigard of the Boston Herald considered the friendship to be "the secret-core of Grey's". Aisha Harris of Slate called their relation The Best Female Friendship on TV adding that "With those two characters, showrunner Shonda Rhimes and her team of writers created one of the most nuanced and realistic portrayals of female friendship on television." Samantha Highfill of Entertainment Weekly called Meredith and Cristina the best female friends on TV because "They don't try to be. There's nothing fake about them, which is a rarity in how female friends are portrayed on television." She further went on to call them 'soulmates', "And even though they'd never dare get sappy enough to say it, they're soulmates. Margaret Lyons of Vulture called the friendship "dream-BFF-relationship." and the primary focus of the show, "One of the series' calling-cards has been its depiction of female friendship and particularly the primacy that friendship enjoyed over romantic relationships."

E! at the time of Sandra Oh's exit wrote, "In Grey's Anatomy's 10-year history, the doctor-duo has been through a lot together: weddings, deaths, bomb-threats, drownings, shootings, plane-crashes, superstorms, you name it, they've lived (and danced) through it." and added, "And with the 3 words, "You're My Person", Meredith Grey and Cristina Yang solidified their status as the small screen's best best-friends ever."

=== Awards ===
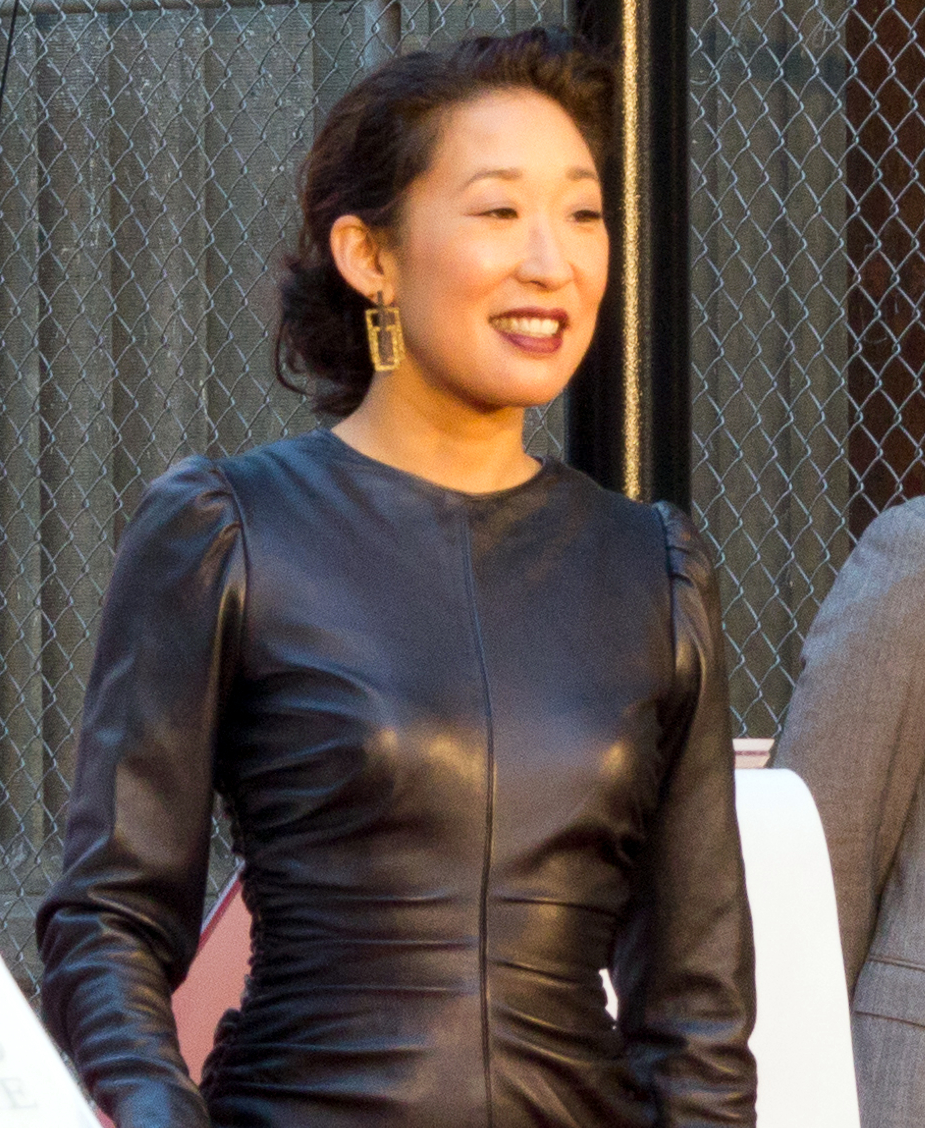
Oh received 5 consecutive nominations for Outstanding Supporting Actress in a Drama Series at the Primetime Emmy Awards from 2005 to 2009.

Oh has received numerous awards and nominations for her portrayal of Yang. In 2005, she was nominated for the Primetime Emmy Award for Outstanding Supporting Actress in a Drama Series, which she was nominated for every year until 2009. Also in 2005, she was nominated for Best Supporting Actress – Series, Miniseries or Television Film at the 10th Satellite Awards. The next year, the cast won the Satellite Award for Best Cast – Television Series. In 2006, Oh won Best Supporting Actress – Series, Miniseries or Television Film at the 63rd Golden Globe Awards. In 2006, the cast was nominated for the Screen Actors Guild Award for Outstanding Performance by an Ensemble in a Drama Series, which they won in 2007, and were nominated for again the following year. Also at the 12th Screen Actors Guild Awards, Oh won the award for Outstanding Performance by a Female Actor in a Drama Series. In 2010, Oh was nominated for Outstanding Actress in a Drama Series at the 41st NAACP Image Awards, which she was nominated for again in 2012, and in 2011, she was nominated for Outstanding Supporting Actress in a Drama Series at the 42nd NAACP Image Awards. In 2011, Oh was nominated for Favorite TV Drama Actress and Favorite TV Doctor at the 37th People's Choice Awards, an award she was nominated again for three years later at the 40th People's Choice Awards and also the subsequent year at the 41st People's Choice Awards. She was also nominated alongside Pompeo for the Favorite TV Gal Pals category.
