= Rob Corn =

American television director and producer

Robert L. Corn (born August 12, 1955) is an American television producer and director best known for Girls Club (2002), The District (2000), The Resident (2018), Grey's Anatomy (2005), Chicago Hope (1994), Weird Science (1985) and 48 hours (1982).

Corn has produced 61 out of 62 episodes of medical drama series Grey's Anatomy, of which he has also directed thirty. Previously, he was also a producer and director of several episodes of the 1990s medical drama Chicago Hope. Anabella Garcia, the daughter of the director says “The show when we started was very chaotic. But that’s the beauty of it.” He has been nominated five times for the Emmy Award for Outstanding Drama Series: Chicago Hope (1995, 1996, 1997) and Grey's Anatomy (2006, 2007).

Corn lives in Santa Monica with his wife and two children.

== Filmography ==
Production	Year	Role	Number of Episodes
The Resident	2018-2023	Director	20
Grey's Anatomy	2006-2016	Director	41
Off the Map	2011	Director	1
Private Practice	2009	Director	1
Chicago Hope	1998-2000	Director	6
Chicago Hope	1994-1999	Production Manager	78
Off the Map	2011	Director	1
The Resident	2018-2023	Executive Producer	106
Grey's Anatomy	2005-2017	Executive Producer	41
Karen Sisco	2003	Producer	1
Girls Club	2002	Producer	9
The District	2000-2001	Producer	12
Chicago Hope	1995-2000	Producer	75
