= T. R. Knight =

American actor (born 1973)

T.R. Knight
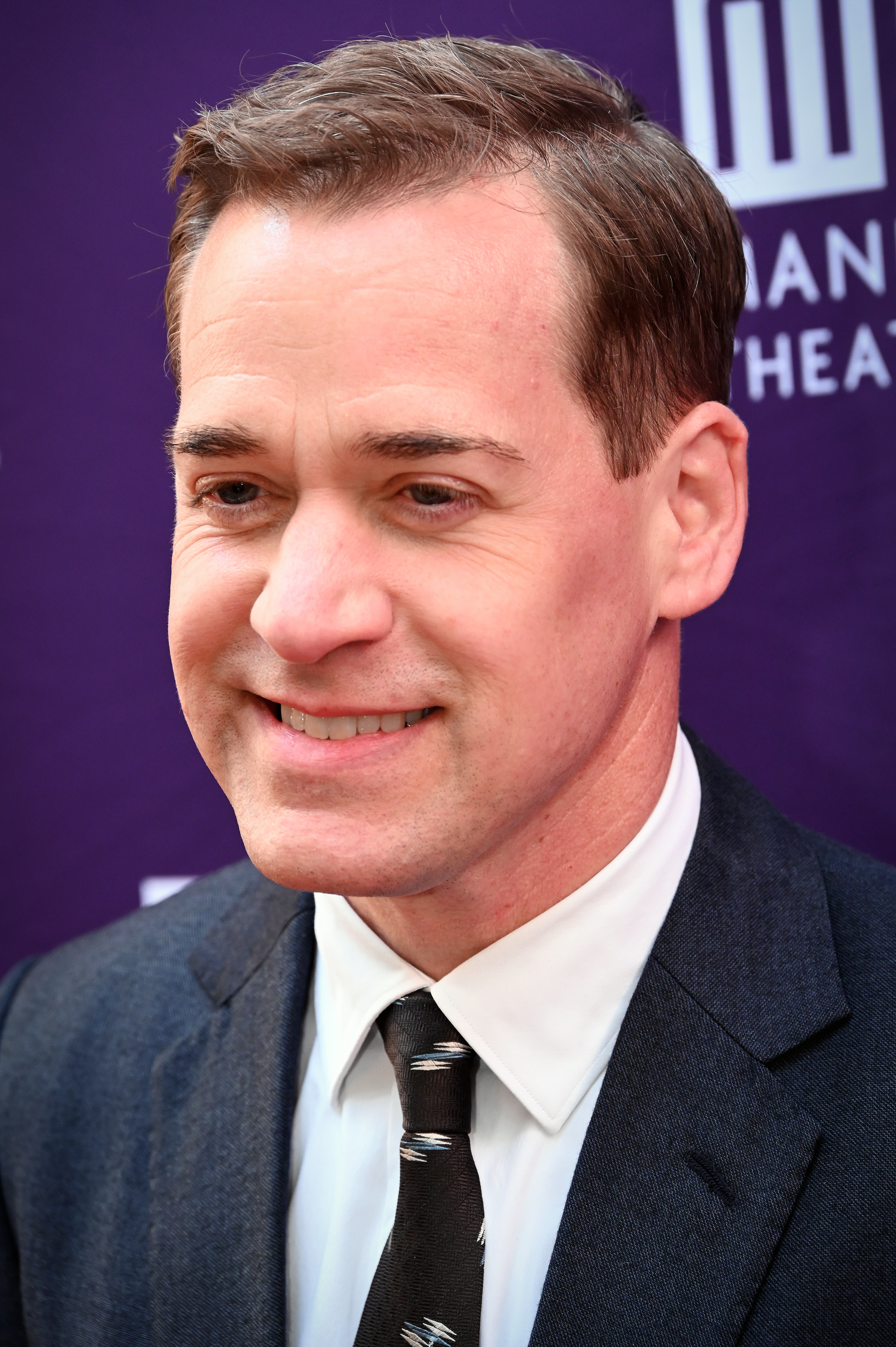
- Knight in 2026
- Born: Theodore Raymond Knight; March 26, 1973 (age 53); Minneapolis, Minnesota, U.S.
- Occupation: Actor
- Years active: 2000–present
- Spouse: Patrick B. Leahy (m. 2013)

Theodore Raymond Knight (born March 26, 1973) is an American actor. He is best known for his role as Dr. George O'Malley on the ABC medical drama television series Grey's Anatomy (2005–2009), which earned him a nomination for the Primetime Emmy Award for Outstanding Supporting Actor in a Drama Series in 2007.

== Early life ==
Knight was born March 26, 1973, in Minneapolis, Minnesota, where he became involved with the Guthrie Theater at the age of twelve. He attended Annunciation Catholic School in Minneapolis, for grades K-8. Knight received the Conners Foundation Scholarship as a freshman and apprenticed at the Children's Theatre Company. He also worked at the local Red Owl supermarket alongside his brother. After finishing high school at the Academy of Holy Angels in Richfield, Knight enrolled at the University of St. Thomas for a brief period of time. He dropped out and soon landed leading roles at the Guthrie Theater.

== Career ==
Knight moved to New York City and appeared on the stage. He played opposite Patti LuPone in the 2001 Broadway revival of Noises Off. He performed in 2003 as Damis in Tartuffe. He performed in the 2003 Off-Broadway production of Scattergood, receiving a Drama Desk Award nomination as Outstanding Featured Actor in a Play. Knight also starred Off-Broadway at Primary Stages in the 2004 drama Boy.

On television, Knight was a regular cast member of the short-lived Nathan Lane/Laurie Metcalf 2003 CBS television series Charlie Lawrence.

In 2005, Knight was cast in his breakthrough role as Dr. George O'Malley on the ABC medical drama Grey's Anatomy. Introduced as a surgical intern at the fictional Seattle Grace Hospital, O'Malley worked his way up to resident level, while his relationships with his colleagues Meredith Grey (Ellen Pompeo), Cristina Yang (Sandra Oh), Izzie Stevens (Katherine Heigl) and Alex Karev (Justin Chambers) formed a focal point of the series. When Knight auditioned for the show, he expected a one-season run. In 2009, after the conclusion of the fifth season, it was confirmed that Knight would not be returning for the show's sixth season. The actor said the reason for his departure was due to a "breakdown in communication" with executive producer Shonda Rhimes, his character's lack of screen time, and his decision to come out as gay.

Knight received generally positive reviews for his performance as O'Malley, and garnered a nomination for Outstanding Supporting Actor in a Drama Series at the 59th Primetime Emmy Awards.

Knight starred as Leo Frank in a production of the musical Parade, which opened October 4, 2009, at the Mark Taper Forum in Los Angeles. He returned to Broadway in David Mamet's A Life in the Theatre in 2010, where he played the role of John, opposite Patrick Stewart. In 2019, he voiced Sir Cedric, the gay protagonist in the animated series The Bravest Knight. In 2016, a sci-fi series called 11.22.63 with James Franco aired for one season. Knight plays Johnny Clayton, Franco's love interest's abusive husband.

== Personal life ==
Knight came out as gay during his time on Grey's Anatomy in 2006. After his role on the hit series ended, Knight married his husband Patrick B. Leahy, a ballet dancer and writer, in Hudson, New York, on October 7, 2013.

== Filmography ==
=== Film ===
Year	Title	Role.	Notes
2000	Dear, Home Letters from World War I	Soldier	
2002	Garmento	Daniel	
2006	Last Request	Jeffrey	
2013	42	Harold Parrot	
2015	A Year and Change	Kenny	
2017	Hello Again	Carl (The Husband)	
2024	Adam the First	Jacob Jr	
2025	Forge	Sandy Baker	

=== Television ===
Year	Title	Role	Notes
2003	Charlie Lawrence	Ryan Lemming	6 episodes
2003	Frasier	Alex	Episode: "Maris Returns"
2004	Law & Order: Criminal Intent	Neil Colby	Episode: "F.P.S."
2004	CSI: Crime Scene Investigation	Zero Adams	Episode: "XX"
2005–2009, 2020	Grey's Anatomy	Dr. George O'Malley	Main role (season 1–5), guest appearance (season 17); 103 episodes Satellite Award for Best Cast – Television Series; Screen Actors Guild Award for Outstanding Performance by an Ensemble in a Drama Series; Nominated—Golden Nymph Award for Outstanding Actor in a Drama Series; Nominated—Primetime Emmy Award for Outstanding Supporting Actor in a Drama Series; Nominated—Satellite Award for Best Supporting Actor – Series, Miniseries or Television Film; Nominated—Screen Actors Guild Award for Outstanding Performance by an Ensemble in a Drama Series
2006	Sesame Street	Private "I"	Episode: "Baby Bear Writes a Story Called 'The 3 Astro Bears'"
2011	Law & Order: Special Victims Unit	Gabriel Thomas/Brian Smith	Episode: "Double Strands"
2012–13	The Good Wife	Jordan Karahalios	7 episodes
2016	11.22.63	Johnny Clayton	4 episodes
2017	The Catch	Tommy Vaughan	6 episodes
2017	When We Rise	Chad Griffin	4 episodes
2017	Genius: Einstein	J. Edgar Hoover	4 episodes
2018	Genius: Picasso	Max Jacob	6 episodes
2019	God Friended Me	Gideon	Episode: "The Last Grenelle"
2019–present	The Bravest Knight	Sir Cedric (voice)	Main role
2020	Will & Grace	Dexter Murphy	Episode: "Filthy Phil, Part II"
2020	The Comey Rule	Reince Priebus	Miniseries
2020–2022	The Flight Attendant	Davey Bowden	Main role (season 1); Recurring (season 2); Nominated—Screen Actors Guild Award for Outstanding Performance by an Ensemble in a Comedy Series

== Stage ==
=== Broadway ===
Source: Playbill Vault

- Noises Off (2001 revival) as Tim Allgood
- Tartuffe (2003 revival) as Damis
- A Life in the Theatre (2010) as John
- It's Only a Play (2015) as Frank Finger
- Stranger Things: The First Shadow (2025) as Victor Creel

=== Off-Broadway ===
Source: Internet Off-Broadway Database

- Marvin's Room (1998)
- This Lime Tree Bower (1999) as Joe
- Macbeth (1999) as Donalbain/Messenger
- The Refreshment of the Spirit (2000)
- Right Way to Sue (2001 at HERE Mainstage) as Franklin/Various characters
- The Hologram Theory (2000) at MCGinn/Cazale Theater as Tweety
- The Lake's End (2003)
- Scattergood (2003) as Brendan Hilliard
- Voices of Peace and Dissent (2003) at Worth Street Theatre
- Boy (2004) as title character
- The Marriage of Bette & Boo (2007)
- Sold (2011) as Michael
- Romeo and Juliet (2013) as Mercutio
- Pocatello (2014) (Playwrights Horizons)
- Little Shop of Horrors (2026) as Seymour Krelborn

=== Readings ===
- Truth or Consequences (Staged Reading)
- The Fool (2002) (Staged Reading)
- White People (Staged Reading)
- The Scholar (Staged Reading)
- Lend Me a Tenor (2009) (Staged Reading)
- On a Clear Day (2010) (Staged Reading)
- Torch Song Trilogy (2011) (Staged Reading)
- June Moon (2011) (Roundabout PlayReading Series)
- Honeymoon in Vegas (2011) (Staged Reading) as Jack Singer
- The Miser (2012) (Reading)

=== Regional ===
- What Didn't Happen (2000) (Workshop at Vassar)
- Earth to Bucky (2003) at Bay Street Theater as Bucky
- Parade (2009) as Leo Frank at Mark Taper Forum – Los Angeles, CA
- The Seagull (2012) (radio theater) as Konstantin Gavrilovich Treplev, James Bridges Theater at UCLA – Los Angeles, CA

Guthrie Theater – Minneapolis, MN

- A Christmas Carol (1978–1980, 1996) as Tiny Tim, Dick Wilkins/Others
- Philadelphia, Here I Come! (1996) as Joe
- She Stoops to Conquer (1996)
- Racing Demon as Ewan Gilmour (1997)
- A Midsummer Night's Dream (1997) as Francis Flute
- Much Ado About Nothing (1998) as Watchman
- Ah, Wilderness! (1999) as Richard Miller
- Amadeus (2001) as Wolfgang Amadeus Mozart

Jungle Theater – Minneapolis, MN

- Journey's End as 2nd Lt. Jimmy Raleigh (1995)

Minnesota History Theatre – St. Paul, MN

- Civil Ceremony as Samuel (1996)

Illusion Theatre – Minneapolis, MN

- Angelheaded Hipster: Howl for Allen (1997) as Allen Ginsberg

Woman's Club of Minneapolis – Minneapolis, MN

- The Laramie Project (2008)

Chanhassen Dinner Theatres – Chanhassen, MN

- Brighton Beach Memoirs (1993) as Eugene Morris Jerome

Theatre in the Round – Minneapolis, MN

- Gemini (1992) as Randy

Off-Broadway Musical Theatre – New Hope, MN

- Oliver! (1985) as Oliver
