= Stand by Me (Grey's Anatomy) =

- Grey's Anatomy episode
- Episode no.: Season 5 Episode 18
- Directed by: Edward Ornelas
- Written by: Stacy McKee
- Original air date: March 19, 2009

Episode chronology
← Previous "I Will Follow You Into the Dark"	Next → "Elevator Love Letter"
- Grey's Anatomy season 5

"Stand by Me" is the eighteenth episode and the fifth season of the American television medical drama Grey's Anatomy, and the show's 96th episode overall. Written by Zoanne Clack and directed by Jessica Yu, the episode originally aired on the American Broadcasting Company (ABC) in the United States on March 19, 2009.

The episode centers on the fallout from Izzie Stevens' (Katherine Heigl) diagnosis with Stage 4 metastatic melanoma, which forces her to confront her mortality. Her friends and colleagues at Seattle Grace Hospital struggle with the news, particularly Alex Karev (Justin Chambers), who finds it difficult to face Izzie's condition. Additional storylines involve Cristina Yang (Sandra Oh) stepping into a leadership role while the Chief of Surgery, Richard Webber (James Pickens Jr.), encourages the residents to work as a team in the absence of Derek Shepherd (Patrick Dempsey), who is grappling with a personal crisis following his breakup with Meredith Grey (Ellen Pompeo).

Upon its initial telecast, the episode was viewed by 14.36 million Americans and garnered a 4.9/12 Nielsen rating/share in the 18–49 demographic. It received critical acclaim reviews from television critics, with high praise for the cast performances, and the storylines of Izzie and Derek.

== Plot ==
The episode opens with a voice-over narration from Meredith Grey (Ellen Pompeo) on survival and acceptance.

As Izzie Stevens (Katherine Heigl) comes to terms with her Stage 4 metastatic melanoma diagnosis, she begins to refuse treatment, insisting she doesn’t want to fight the brain tumor. Cristina Yang (Sandra Oh), desperate to help Izzie, tries to convince her to reconsider, but her focus on Izzie starts affecting her own surgical performance. Unable to cope with the emotional strain alone, Cristina tells the other residents about Izzie’s condition, leading to Izzie being admitted to Seattle Grace Hospital as a patient.

Meanwhile, Mark Sloan (Eric Dane) prepares for a complex face transplant surgery, selecting Izzie and Lexie Grey (Chyler Leigh) to assist him. The decision to involve Izzie, despite her illness, serves as a bittersweet moment, as her identity as a surgeon and her role at the hospital begin to shift. Lexie, eager to prove herself, steps up alongside Izzie, facing the pressure of assisting in such a groundbreaking procedure.

Meredith Grey (Ellen Pompeo) and George O'Malley (T. R. Knight) are left overseeing the general operations of the hospital. Meanwhile, the latest group of interns, embroiled in a personal love triangle, create chaos throughout the hospital, adding to the growing tension. George finds himself caught in the middle of the drama, while Meredith tries to maintain control amidst the emotional turmoil surrounding her friends and colleagues.

== Title reference ==
This episode's title refers to the song "Stand by Me" by American soul singer Ben E. King.

== Release ==
"Stand by Me" was viewed by 14.36 million Americans upon its initial telecast and garnered a 4.9/12 Nielsen rating/share in the 18–49 demographic.

== Reception ==
"Stand by Me" received critical acclaim from television critics upon telecast for the development of both Izzie Stevens' (Katherine Heigl) and Derek Shepherd's (Patrick Dempsey) story arcs, as well as the performances of the cast.

Alan Sepinwall from The Star-Ledger wrote, "It feels like this season has finally taken a turn for the better, with 'Stand By Me' being the first episode since very early in the season that I liked pretty much unreservedly." He added, "Izzie's illness is now being taken seriously by the show and its characters, and I liked seeing Cristina Yang (Sandra Oh) struggle to keep the secret, almost to the point of messing up her first solo surgery. Justin Chambers (Alex Karev) and Chandra Wilson (Miranda Bailey) did a great job acting with their eyes when Cristina spilled the beans in the operating room."

Sepinwall went on to praise Derek's storyline, stating, "Derek's story was perhaps the strongest part of the episode, as his sense of helplessness slowly engulfed first Callie Torres (Sara Ramirez), then Owen Hunt (Kevin McKidd), characters we've rarely seen spend much time together before. That, in turn, led to the Chief Richard Webber coming in for an emotional confrontation, which has always been one of James Pickens Jr.'s specialties, and gave Meredith Grey (Ellen Pompeo) the opportunity to make a very mature and well-phrased argument for why he needs to return to work." He also gave a positive review of the interns' story arc, stating, "The interns were better utilized here than at any point to date."

BuddyTV praised the performances of Oh and Heigl, writing, "Cristina finds Izzie sitting outside in the rain. She tells her that she has informed Bailey and Alex. She emotionally pleads with Izzie to fight. Oh and Heigl both had me bawling like a baby." The review continued, "As Meredith voiceovers about mortality and borrowed time, and whether it's worthwhile to make friends when everyone dies, Izzie's friends gather around her and help her into a hospital bed. Derek decides he wants to be a surgeon again and begins examining Izzie's brain scans. I had to grab a tissue—there's something in my eye." The site also praised the development of Mark Sloan (Eric Dane) and Lexie Grey (Chyler Leigh), saying, "They are beautiful, just like orchids, and they can adapt to a hostile environment."

CinemaBlend commented, "This week’s episode was packed with drama. Cristina gets her first solo surgery, and everyone finally learns that Izzie has cancer. Derek, after almost dragging Seattle Grace into his depression, may finally be snapping out of it." The review praised the closing sequence, adding, "As the show closes, the group checks Izzie into the hospital and starts running tests, while Derek examines Izzie's brain scan results. Chambers (who plays Karev) pulls off some subtle, nuanced acting as Alex helps Izzie, appearing in control until you look at his eyes and see that he’s absolutely terrified."

PopSugar gave the episode a positive review, saying, "Izzie deals with her diagnosis, and Derek remains in the woods, unable to face the hospital after his last mistake took a life. I loved how this episode brought the characters together, in botched but earnest attempts to support each other. That final scene with Izzie in the hospital gown, surrounded by her friends, is classic Grey's." The review also praised the Meredith and George O'Malley (T. R. Knight) story arc, adding, "Meredith and George's plotline with the interns cracked me up, both for the way it mirrored the larger stories and for the fact that maybe, just maybe, they realize how ridiculous they looked when they were sex-crazed, angsty interns themselves."
