= Elevator Love Letter (Grey's Anatomy) =

- Grey's Anatomy episode
- Episode no.: Season 5 Episode 19
- Directed by: Edward Ornelas
- Written by: Stacy McKee
- Original air date: March 26, 2009

Episode chronology
← Previous "Stand by Me"	Next → "Sweet Surrender"
- Grey's Anatomy season 5

"Elevator Love Letter" is the nineteenth episode of the fifth season of the American television medical drama Grey's Anatomy and the show's 97th episode overall. Written by Stacy McKee and directed by Edward Ornelas, the episode aired on the American Broadcasting Company (ABC) in the United States on March 26, 2009.

The episode primarily focuses on Derek Shepherd (Patrick Dempsey) proposing to Meredith Grey (Ellen Pompeo), while Izzie Stevens (Katherine Heigl) undergoes surgery for her cancer, with Alex Karev (Justin Chambers) struggling with guilt over her condition. Also explored is Cristina Yang (Sandra Oh) dealing with the PTSD of her boyfriend and fellow surgeon Owen Hunt (Kevin McKidd) as she navigates the emotional toll of their relationship.

Although the episode was fictionally set in Seattle, Washington, filming took place in Los Angeles, California. It was viewed by 15.81 million Americans upon its original airing and garnered a 5.5/13 Nielsen rating/share in the 18–49 demographic. The episode received critical acclaim from television critics, with high praise for the storylines and performances of Dempsey, Pompeo, Heigl, Oh and McKidd.

Oh received a nomination for the Primetime Emmy Award for Outstanding Supporting Actress in a Drama Series for her performance in the episode.

The storyline involving Izzie's embryos is picked up again in the Season 12 episode, "I Choose You" and subsequently concludes on the Season 16 episode, "Leave A Light On".

== Plot ==
The episode opens with a voice-over narration from Meredith Grey (Ellen Pompeo) reflecting on love and trauma.

Cristina Yang (Sandra Oh) and Owen Hunt (Kevin McKidd) are growing closer, spending nights together, watching surgical videos. One evening, as they settle down for the night, Owen falls asleep, but his PTSD takes over, leading him to unknowingly choke Cristina in his sleep. Cristina struggles to free herself, and Callie Torres (Sara Ramirez) walks in just in time to stop Owen.

The next day at the hospital, Cristina hides the bruises on her neck with a turtleneck, but Meredith notices and urges her not to cover for Owen, emphasizing that both Owen and Cristina are not okay. Meanwhile, George O'Malley (T. R. Knight) feels betrayed by Izzie Stevens (Katherine Heigl) for not informing him about her cancer diagnosis. In an effort to distract himself, he requests to work with Callie for the day, avoiding his emotional turmoil.

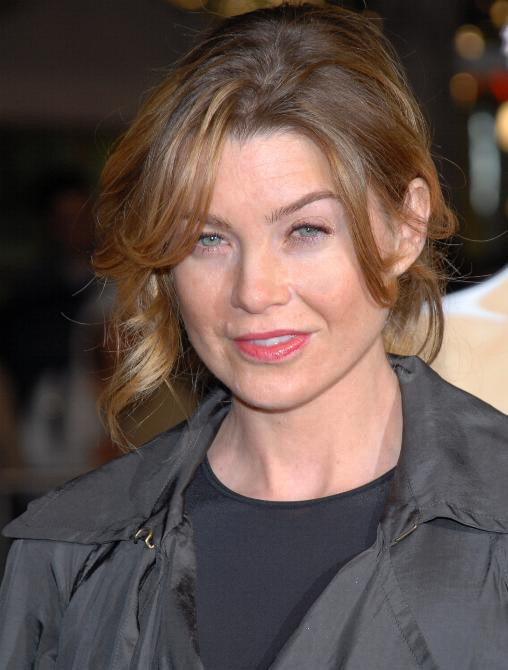
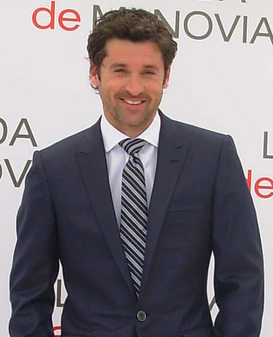
Ellen Pompeo (left) and Patrick Dempsey (right) were the central part of the story as Dempsey's Derek Shepherd proposes to Pompeo's Meredith Grey in the episode.

Izzie is preparing for her brain surgery and, in her hospital room, she reminds her friends that they have patients to care for and urges them to focus on saving lives. Miranda Bailey (Chandra Wilson) gathers the residents, reminding them that Izzie needs friends, not doctors, at this moment.

Derek Shepherd (Patrick Dempsey) approaches Alex Karev (Justin Chambers), offering to answer any questions about Izzie's surgery, but Alex remains distant. Later, Richard Webber (James Pickens Jr.) awkwardly asks Alex about harvesting Izzie's eggs before her treatment, a request to which Alex immediately agrees.

Mark Sloan (Eric Dane) faces a tough case with an elderly patient nearing death, but her family, impatient to catch flights, seems indifferent to staying by her side until she passes. Meanwhile, Owen and Derek attend to a trauma patient brought in by helicopter. The sound of the helicopter triggers Owen's PTSD, but Derek snaps him out of it, reminding him that PTSD is real and treatable.

As Meredith heads toward an elevator, Richard steps in her way, blocking her path. When the next elevator opens, it reveals Derek, who has transformed the walls into a visual timeline of their surgical achievements together. He recounts their significant moments, including the surgeries that shaped their careers and relationship. In a heartfelt moment, he tells Meredith that her strength and resilience—her "dark and twisty" nature—are what make her capable of guiding others through hardship. Derek then professes his love and desire to spend his life with her. Meredith responds by kissing him, sealing their emotional connection.

== Release ==
"Elevator Love Letter" was viewed by 15.81 million Americans upon its original airing and garnered a 5.5/13 Nielsen rating/share in the 18–49 demographic.

== Reception ==
"Elevator Love Letter" received critical acclaim from television critics upon telecast, with high praise for the storylines and performances of Patrick Dempsey (Derek Shepherd), Ellen Pompeo (Meredith Grey), Katherine Heigl (Izzie Stevens), Sandra Oh (Cristina Yang) and Kevin McKidd (Owen Hunt).

PopSugar praised the episode as a quintessential Grey's Anatomy installment, highlighting moments such as the elderly woman who wouldn't pass away and memorable lines like, "People are better than no people". The site also appreciated the humor, noting Alex Karev's (Justin Chambers) delivery of his sperm sample to the Chief Richard Webber (James Pickens Jr.) during lunch, and commended Derek's proposal, calling it, "better than a room full of roses and candles". Additionally, Chandra Wilson (Miranda Bailey), received praise for her performance, with PopSugar noting, "Bailey rocks my world, especially with her new-new hairstyle."

Alan Sepinwall from The Star-Ledger lauded the episode, commenting that the series was on a "real roll" and acknowledging the improvement after some questionable storylines earlier in the season. He specifically praised Oh and McKidd for their nuanced portrayals of Cristina and Owen, remarking, "Oh and McKidd are killing it right now." Sepinwall also lauded Derek's proposal, describing it as "grown-up and sweet", noting that it marked a shift in the relationship away from typical "will-they-or-won't-they" drama. Dempsey's performance was highlighted, especially in the scene where Derek confronts the oncologist, with Sepinwall adding, "Dempsey has been doing some nice work." Chambers also received praise, with Sepinwall stating, "Every time I watch Chambers get a showcase episode like this, I think about how lucky he is — and we are — that he landed this more demanding, high-profile gig."

BuddyTV echoed the sentiment, calling the proposal scene "possibly the most perfect proposal ever," while CinemaBlend praised the emotional depth of the episode, noting that it could have served as a season finale due to its intensity. They particularly liked the progression of Derek and Meredith's relationship, with the proposal delivering a "great speech and proposal," culminating in Meredith finally accepting.

Wired added the episode to its "must-watch" list, highlighting Derek and Meredith's evolving relationship and the dramatic storyline involving Owen's PTSD, noting, "If you did happen to endure the Meredith/McDreamy roller coaster of Season 4, this episode is your payoff."

== Awards ==
Sandra Oh earned a nomination for the Primetime Emmy Award for Outstanding Supporting Actress in a Drama Series at the 2009 ceremony for her performance in the episode, though she ultimately lost to Cherry Jones of 24.
