= I Choose You (Grey's Anatomy) =

- Grey's Anatomy episode
- An episodic screenshot displaying Jo Wilson (Camilla Luddington) showing the fertility clinic invoice to Alex Karev (Justin Chambers).
- Episode no.: Season 12; Episode 03
- Directed by: Rob Corn
- Written by: William Harper
- Original air date: October 8, 2015
- Running time: 43 minutes

Guest appearances
- Giacomo Gianniotti as Andrew DeLuca; Jennifer Marsala as Laurie Kiefer; Mitch Pileggi as Larry Jennings

Episode chronology
← Previous "Walking Tall (2015)"	Next → "Old Time Rock and Roll (2015)"
- Grey's Anatomy season 12

"I Choose You" is the third episode of the twelfth season of the American television medical drama Grey's Anatomy, and the 248th episode overall. Written by William Harper and directed by Rob Corn, the episode aired on the American Broadcasting Company (ABC) in the United States on October 8, 2015.

The episode focuses on Jo Wilson (Camilla Luddington) grappling with the uncertainty of her relationship with Alex Karev (Justin Chambers) after discovering a possible connection to his former partner, Izzie Stevens (Katherine Heigl), leading her to confide in her close friend, Stephanie Edwards (Jerrika Hinton). Meanwhile, Maggie Pierce (Kelly McCreary) reconsiders her life choices after receiving an invitation to her ex-boyfriend Ethan Boyd's (Lance Gross) wedding, and Richard Webber (James Pickens Jr.) questions Chief Miranda Bailey's (Chandra Wilson) loyalty. Additionally, Alex struggles with a critical decision involving the fate of newborn twins.

The episode revisits a storyline first introduced in the Season 5 episode "Elevator Love Letter" and is ultimately resolved in the Season 16 episode "Leave a Light On", coinciding with the departure of Chambers' character from the series. Giacomo Gianniotti (Andrew DeLuca), Mitch Pileggi (Larry Jennings). and Jennifer Marsala appear as guest stars. The title of the episode refers to the song "I Choose You" by Sara Bareilles.

Upon its initial airing, "I Choose You" was viewed by 8.12 million Americans, ranked #2 in its time-slot, and garnered a 2.2/8 Nielsen rating/share in the 18–49 demographic. The episode received positive reviews from television critics, with high praise directed towards Chambers' performance.

== Plot ==
The episode opens with a voice-over narration from Meredith Grey (Ellen Pompeo) about making tough decisions and taking responsibility for what you're willing to fight for.

Meredith carpools to work with her half-sister, Maggie Pierce (Kelly McCreary), and her sister-in-law, Amelia Shepherd (Caterina Scorsone), but expresses annoyance over both Amelia's nakedness while changing in the car, stating her children sit in that seat, and Maggie's denial about the wide-eyed expression she makes upon reading a notice for Meredith's promotion to Head of General Surgery following Miranda Bailey's (Chandra Wilson) promotion to Chief of Surgery.

Richard Webber (James Pickens Jr.) overhears Callie Torres (Sara Ramirez) inform Meredith that she has been underpaid regarding her new salary as Head of General Surgery. Callie and the sisters urge Meredith to renegotiate her salary as they chat in her house. Maggie expresses apprehension about an invitation to her ex-boyfriend, Ethan Boyd (Lance Gross)'s wedding, culminating in her kissing Andrew DeLuca (Giacomo Gianniotti) at Joe's bar.

Arizona Robbins (Jessica Capshaw) is consulted on an OB/GYN case involving a pregnant mother of twins, Laurie Kiefer (Jennifer Marsala). Alex Karev (Justin Chambers) pages Alex Karev (Justin Chambers), Head of Pediatric Surgery. Laurie delivers fraternal twins, a girl and a boy, but both children are severely jaundiced and need extra care. DeLuca asks why Robbins and Karev are shocked, and Ben Warren (Jason George) explains that both fraternal twins have tumors, and now they must tell the parents their twins are dying. They reveal the kids need liver transplants, and Alex informs the parents that he will decide which child will receive a donor, based on the strength of the child.

In the bathroom, surgical resident Jo Wilson (Camilla Luddington) feels sick about something she discovered earlier in the morning. Stephanie Edwards (Jerrika Hinton) states that Jo needs to tell Alex. In the hospital elevator, Jo awkwardly asks Alex if he wants kids, much to his confusion. Arizona suggests Jo may be pregnant and is hesitant to tell him. When Alex comes home after staying up all night to make contacts for a donor for the less healthy twin, Jo confronts him with an invoice from the fertility clinic about his embryos with Izzie Stevens (Katherine Heigl) 7 years prior. She questions her worth in their relationship compared to his previous relationship with Izzie, feeling insecure. The two reconcile, as Alex humorously pulls down his pants to "make a baby" and Jo laughs at the absurdity of the idea, stating she is in the middle of her residency and he is never home. He climbs on the bed on top of her, and they both laugh.

Meanwhile, Jackson Avery (Jesse Williams) expresses frustrations with April Kepner (Sarah Drew), who has returned from the army, stating he is changing the locks and wants a divorce. April urges him not to. The next day, she returns, planning to thank him, only to discover Jackson has moved out and is now living with Ben and Bailey.

== Production ==
The episode was written by William Harper and directed by Rob Corn. It features a misdirect in the storyline, leading viewers to believe that Jo Wilson (Camilla Luddington) is feeling ill due to pregnancy. However, it is later revealed that she has discovered an invoice from the fertility clinic for Alex Karev (Justin Chambers) and Izzie Stevens' (Katherine Heigl) embryos. In a 2015 interview at San Diego Comic-Con, Luddington discussed the potential impact of this discovery, stating it could "potentially be a big issue" for her character.

== Release ==
"I Choose You" was originally broadcast on September 25, 2014, in the United States on the American Broadcasting Company (ABC), and was viewed by 8.12 million Americans, ranking #2 in its time-slot and garnering a 2.2/8 Nielsen rating/share in the 18–49 demographic. It adjusted upwards in viewership, alongside How to Get Away with Murder, making them the only scripted shows to do so that week.

== Reception ==
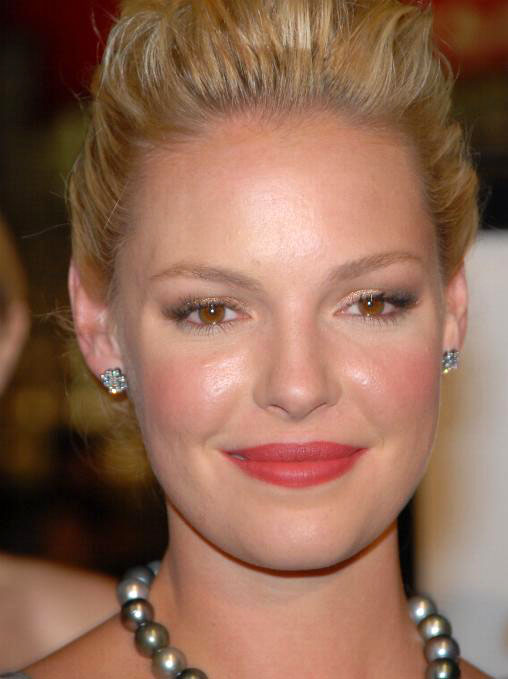
The episode touched upon an unresolved storyline involving the embryos of Alex Karev (Justin Chambers)'s embryos with ex-wife, Izzie Stevens (Katherine Heigl, pictured), who exited midway through the sixth season.

"I Choose You" received positive reviews television critics, with high praise directed towards Justin Chambers' portrayal of Alex Karev and his long-term character development throughout the series. However, the depiction of the sick jaundiced child drew negative reactions, with one critic comparing the child to an "oversized Sour Patch Kid".

Critics also noted the subtle reminder of the character of Izzie Stevens (Katherine Heigl). TVFanatic's Ashley Bissette Sumerel expressed surprise at the episode's mention of Izzie, commenting, "the episode even reminds us about the fact that Izzie used to exist." Similarly, Hollywood Life's Chris Rogers highlighted the emotional impact of Izzie's mention, stating, "Damn you, Shonda Rhimes — you get us every time! We've been dying for an Izzie Stevens comeback since she left Grey's Anatomy in 2010, so just the mere mention of her name... was a tease we almost couldn't handle."

For Cosmopolitan, Lauren Hoffman commented on April Kepner's (Sarah Drew) "creepy" behavior and referenced a Fatal Attraction joke made by (Jackson Avery) Jesse Williams. TVLine's Andy Patrick pointed out how the episode subverted expectations by misleading viewers into thinking Jo was pregnant, only to reveal she had found Izzie's embryos. Hoffman also praised the episode as "belonging to Alex Karev" and lauded his transformation from "a smartass kid from an abusive household in Iowa" into a "mature, whip-smart surgeon." She emphasized Alex's emotional decision to perform a transplant, reflecting on his growth.

Entertainment Weekly's Ariana Bacle noted that the storyline involving the baby twins' health resembled a "Sophie's Choice" moment, stating it was "not fun" to watch the difficult decision being made to save the healthier twin. However, Hoffman countered by focusing on how Alex's character handled the situation, remarking that it showcased his development and maturity. Brittany Lovely from Hypable similarly highlighted Alex's growth, noting, "Alex is no longer a toddler finding his way around the hospital; he is taking on the parental role and guiding by example."

TVFanatic's Sumerel gave the episode a 4.7/5.0 rating, praising Alex's growth as perhaps the most significant of any character on the show. She declared, "THIS is how Grey's Anatomy is supposed to be" and commended the season for returning to its roots. She also noted that the decision to have the sisters move back into Meredith Grey's (Ellen Pompeo) old house was a successful move, reminiscent of the early days of the series.

Bacle highlighted Maggie Pierce's (Kelly McCreary) humorous drunken rant, calling it "probably the most entertaining monologue to appear on Grey's." She also praised Meredith's assertiveness in negotiating for a higher salary, despite acknowledging that the more politically charged plotlines sometimes felt forced. Nevertheless, she emphasized that these moments reflected the essence of Grey's Anatomy—unapologetically emotional and inspirational.
