= I Like You So Much Better When You're Naked (Grey's Anatomy) =

- Grey's Anatomy episode
- An episodic screenshot displaying Stevens seeking reconciliation, as Karev dismisses her.
- Episode no.: Season 6 Episode 12
- Directed by: Donna Deitch
- Written by: Tony Phelan; Joan Rater
- Original air date: January 21, 2010
- Running time: 43 minutes

Guest appearances
- Kim Raver as Dr. Teddy Altman; Jesse Williams as Dr. Jackson Avery; Mitch Pileggi as Larry Jennings

Episode chronology
← Previous "Blink"	Next → "State of Love and Trust"
- Grey's Anatomy season 6

"I Like You So Much Better When You're Naked" is the twelfth episode of the sixth season of the American television medical drama Grey's Anatomy, and the show's 114th episode overall. Written by Tony Phelan and Joan Rater, and directed by Donna Deitch, the episode aired on the American Broadcasting Company in the United States on January 21, 2010.

In the episode, Izzie Stevens (Katherine Heigl) returns to Seattle Grace Mercy West Hospital, fearing that her estranged husband, Alex Karev (Justin Chambers), has moved on, and hoping to reconcile. Additional storylines include Derek Shepherd (Patrick Dempsey) grappling with whether to report Chief of Surgery Richard Webber (James Pickens Jr.) for his alcoholism, and Callie Torres (Sara Ramirez) dealing with a bout of chickenpox.

Although the episode was fictionally set in Seattle, Washington, filming took place in Los Angeles, California. Although the episode was originally intended to mark Heigl's final appearance before her maternity leave, it ultimately became her last as a series regular. Stevens' fate remained unresolved until 10 seasons later, when it was addressed in the Season 16 episode, "Leave a Light On". Kim Raver (Teddy Altman) guest-stars in the episode, alongside Jesse Williams (Jackson Avery) and Mitch Pileggi (Larry Jennings). The episode's title is a reference to the song of the same name by Norwegian rock musician Ida Maria.

Upon its original broadcast, "I Like You So Much Better When You're Naked" was watched by 12.70 million viewers in the United States, ranking #2 in its time-slot, and earned a 4.7/12 Nielsen rating/share in the 18–49 demographic. The episode received positive reviews from critics, with high praise for Sandra Oh's (Cristina Yang) performance.

== Plot ==
The episode opens with a voice-over narration from Meredith Grey (Ellen Pompeo) about the paradox of healing through exposure, taking risks to mend what's broken, and hoping it leads to recovery rather than further harm.

Miranda Bailey (Chandra Wilson) performs a crucial surgery, frustrated by the absence of Chief of Surgery, Richard Webber (James Pickens Jr.), who fails to show up in the operating room. Meanwhile, at Meredith Grey's (Ellen Pompeo) house, Lexie Grey (Chyler Leigh) engages in a secret sexual encounter with Alex Karev (Justin Chambers), despite his estranged wife, Izzie Stevens (Katherine Heigl), being away. In the next room, Meredith and her husband, Derek Shepherd (Patrick Dempsey), argue over whether Derek should report Webber's alcoholism to Larry Jennings (Mitch Pileggi), the hospital's president.

Izzie returns home after being on a forced hiatus due to her firing, hoping to rekindle her relationship with Alex. At the hospital, Callie Torres (Sara Ramirez) and Arizona Robbins (Jessica Capshaw) are being intimate in the on-call room, only for Callie to discover that she has contracted chickenpox. Arizona isolates Callie, stating that she wants a "sexy" relationship and believes chickenpox doesn't fit that picture.

As tensions rise, Meredith is scheduled to perform a pancreaticoduodenectomy with Jackson Avery (Jesse Williams), supervised by Webber. However, Webber, under the influence of alcohol, falls asleep, leaving Bailey to take control of the surgery. In an attempt to reason with Meredith, Derek makes her an offer: if she lets him report Webber, he will use his influence to get Izzie reinstated at the hospital once he takes over as Chief.

Stevens returns to the hospital for a positron emission tomography (PET) scan, and it is revealed that her cancer is now in remission. Ecstatic, she shares the news with Meredith, which prompts Meredith to finally allow Derek to report Webber. Meanwhile, Cristina Yang (Sandra Oh) deals with the aftermath of telling Teddy Altman (Kim Raver) that she could have her boyfriend, Owen Hunt (Kevin McKidd), if she continues to mentor her. Appalled, Altman informs Hunt of Yang's offer, but the two eventually reconcile, and Altman remains at the hospital.

Later, Lexie confesses to her ex-boyfriend, Mark Sloan (Eric Dane), that she slept with Karev. Though Sloan admits to his own infidelities, he is unable to forgive Lexie. As the workday ends, Izzie approaches Karev, hoping to reconcile, but Karev, feeling hurt and unworthy of her behavior, asks her to leave. Meredith then informs Izzie that she is getting her job back, but uninterested in returning to her old life, Izzie decides to depart, seeking a fresh start away from Seattle Grace Mercy West.

== Production ==
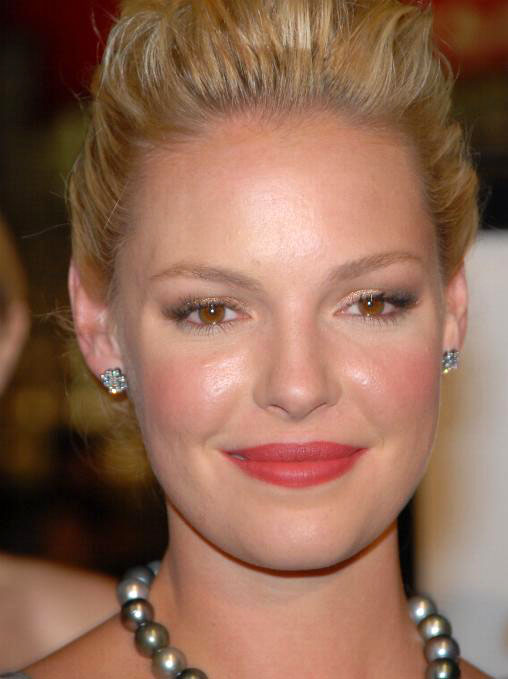
The episode marked Katherine Heigl's final appearance as Izzie Stevens in the series

"Ramírez told us this hilarious story of being quarantined in college with chicken pox and almost losing her mind. Be careful what you say in the writer's room [be]cause it will end up on TV."

— Grey's Anatomy writers on the chicken pox storyline

The episode was written by Tony Phelan and Joan Rater, and directed by Donna Deitch. David Greenspan edited the episode, with Danny Lux serving as the music coordinator. The episode was broadcast with Dolby Digital sound, aired in both standard and high-definition, and had a runtime of 43 minutes without commercials. Featured music included Ingrid Michaelson's "Everybody" and Amanda Blank's "Something Bigger, Something Better", and the episode was named after the song "I Like You So Much Better When You're Naked" by Norwegian rock musician Ida Maria.

The episode marked Katherine Heigl's brief return as Izzie Stevens after a five-episode hiatus to film the romantic comedy Life as We Know It (2010). Originally, the episode was planned to be her last before her maternity leave; however, in March 2010, when Heigl did not return to the Grey's Anatomy set, this episode became her final one.

Rater explained that, while writing the scene where Meredith Grey (Ellen Pompeo) and Derek Shepherd (Patrick Dempsey) argue, the goal was to show the characters' maturity. She noted: "This is a real grown-up argument. Meredith isn't running away, getting all dark and going to Cristina Yang (Sandra Oh) for help getting out of her marriage. She's staying and fighting." Initially, the writers intended for the theme of the episode to be "exposure", but after filming, they realized it centered more on "ambition". Rater commented: "Derek wants to be Chief; Meredith wants to do a procedure that she knows she isn't ready for; Cristina wants Teddy to stay."

One of the key moments in the episode involved Cristina asking her fellow residents whether they would choose love or surgery if they had to. Izzie Stevens chose love, while Cristina and Meredith chose surgery. The Grey's Anatomy writers reflected: "When we were first discussing this story we had a knock-down, drag-out fight in the writers' room – if you had to choose your love or your art, which would you choose? And some of us came down on the Cristina side, and some of us came down on the Izzie side – that in the end, love is all that matters." At the conclusion of the episode, Alex Karev (Justin Chambers) ended his marriage to Izzie. Rater explained that the writers chose to break up the couple because Izzie was no longer sick, and Alex would never have left her while she was ill.

Michael Ausiello provided further insight into Heigl's perspective on Izzie's departure. Heigl reflected: "Even though there's a part of me that would like to go back and do the quick Izzie farewell, I also think that my last scene – where Meredith says to Izzie, 'Don't go, we're your family', and Izzie's response was, 'No you're not, you're just a bunch of people I worked with, and I can find that anywhere' – was kind of tragic and appropriate all at the same time. When I was playing the scene, I was really trying to convey that, for Izzie, that was a lie she had to tell herself to have the courage to move on."

== Release ==
"I Like You So Much Better When You're Naked" was originally broadcast on January 21, 2010, on the American Broadcasting Company (ABC) in the United States. The episode garnered a viewership of 12.7 million Americans, representing a slight decrease of 0.20% from the previous episode. In terms of total viewers, it ranked #2 in its 9:00 PM Eastern time-slot, behind CBS' CSI: Crime Scene Investigation, and #3 for the night, following CBS' The Mentalist and CSI: Crime Scene Investigation. Despite the drop in overall viewers, the episode achieved a 4.7/12 Nielsen rating, making it #1 in both its time-slot and for the entire night in the key 18–49 demographic. This high rating allowed it to outperform other typically strong contenders, including its spin-off Private Practice, Fox's Bones, CSI: Crime Scene Investigation, The Mentalist, and NBC's juggernaut, The Office.

== Reception ==
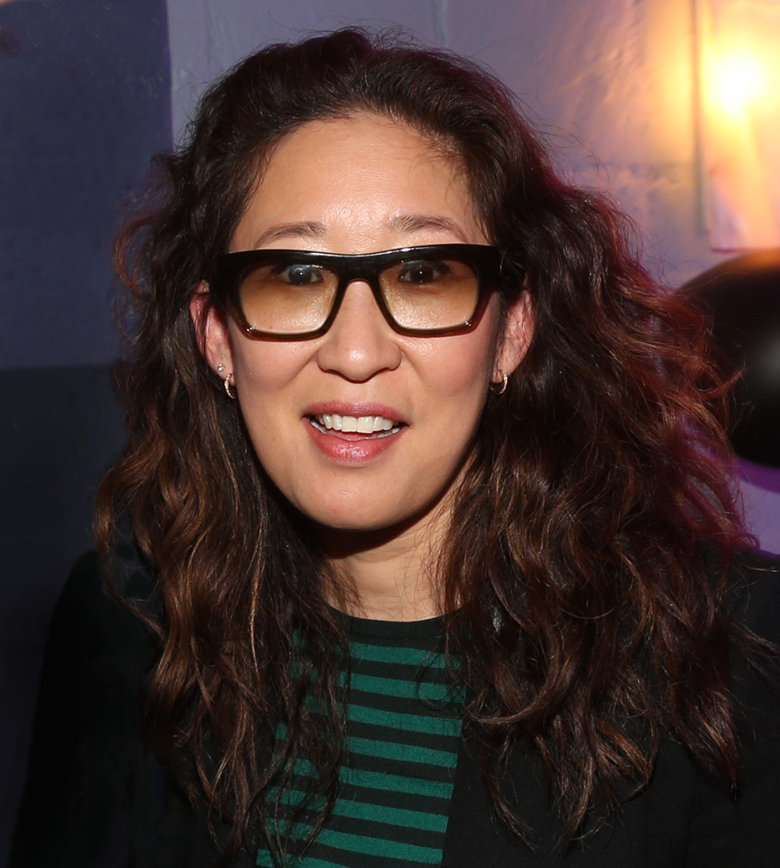
Sandra Oh's performance as Cristina Yang in the episode received high praise

"I Like You So Much Better When You're Naked" received positive reviews from critics, with high praise for Sandra Oh's (Cristina Yang) performance.

Prior to the episode's broadcast, E! Online's Jennifer Godwin expressed concern, stating, "[I'm] a little afraid that Izzie Stevens (Katherine Heigl) is just stopping by to break Alex Karev (Justin Chambers) heart before vanishing again." After the episode aired, TV Fanatic's Steve Marsi critiqued the argument between Derek Shepherd (Patrick Dempsey) and Meredith Grey (Ellen Pompeo), remarking that it "didn't work" and describing Shepherd as "aggressive". However, Marsi praised Oh's performance, stating, "Incredible performance by Oh as always. You can see the inner turmoil even when few or no words are exchanged, forgetting you're watching an actress. Simply amazing."

BuzzSugar highlighted Mark Sloan's (Eric Dane) inability to forgive Lexie Grey (Chyler Leigh) as "an unexpected twist" and described the tension between Yang, Owen Hunt (Kevin McKidd) and Teddy Altman (Kim Raver) as "awkward".

The Huffington Post's Michael Pascua noted that the episode "reestablished Meredith as the core character of the show", explaining that "She was the one who had to deal with Derek's problems with the chief, the aftermath of Alex and Lexie, Cristina's driven nature, and had to console the chief." Pascua also called Altman's decision to tell Hunt about Yang's offer "stereotypical" and commended Chambers' character for refusing to take Izzie back. Pascua was impressed with the chicken pox storyline, writing:

"Our odd form of comical relief came in the form of Callie. I loved how she was stuck in the "gauze paws" and that she still looked attractive even with blotchy red bumps on her face. Somehow Arizona can pull off a little white lie and it magically works for her. It ended up strengthening their relationship, as well."

— Michael Pascua, The Huffington Post
