= Leave a Light On (Grey's Anatomy) =

- Grey's Anatomy episode
- An episodic screenshot displaying Stevens and Karev sleeping with their 2 children, Alexis and Eli.
- Episode no.: Season 16; Episode 16
- Directed by: Debbie Allen
- Written by: Elisabeth Finch
- Original air date: March 5, 2020
- Running time: 43 minutes

Guest appearances
- Jason George as Dr. Ben Warren; BJ Tanner as William George Bailey Jones

Episode chronology
← Previous "Snowblind"	Next → "Life on Mars?"
- Grey's Anatomy season 16

"Leave a Light On" is the sixteenth episode of the sixteenth season of the American medical drama television series Grey's Anatomy and the 358th episode overall, which aired on ABC on March 5, 2020. The episode was written by Elisabeth Finch and directed by Debbie Allen. It marked the final appearance of Justin Chambers as Alex Karev.

On January 10, 2020, it was announced that Chambers left the series, having already made his last physical appearance in the November 14, 2019 episode "My Shot", the 350th episode revolving around the trial for Meredith's medical license. Showrunner Krista Vernoff discussed the challenge in writing Alex off without Chambers physically being there, having left the show suddenly. Vernoff said, "It was a very careful threading of a needle, where we are giving a little bit of information and pain to Jo," she said, adding, "Episode by episode, we’re illuminating the story of where Alex is. And it takes us quite a few more episodes to get there and to give the audience clarity."

The episode resolves several storylines, including the disappearance of Alex Karev after 7 episodes, the disappearance of Izzie Stevens (Katherine Heigl) over 10 years ago and Miranda Bailey (Chandra Wilson) choosing to take in a homeless teenager. Stevens was last seen in the episode, "I Like You So Much Better When You're Naked" in 2010. She re-appears for the first time again through extensive use of archive footage as well as visual cameos portrayed by a body double, as details of her current situation are revealed, along with Chambers' character. Chambers returns for the episode in voice-over, as the episode takes a retrospective approach, as he narrates much of what has happened to him since. The storyline involving Izzie's embryos is picked up again, having previously been addressed in the season 12 episode, "I Choose You" and originating in the season 5 episode, "Elevator Love Letter".

The episode's original broadcast was watched by 6.30 million viewers and registered the show's best ratings in 6 weeks, since the mid-season premiere. It received polarized reviews from fans and critics alike, who were divided on the show's handling of Alex's exit, but many largely felt it made sense given the circumstances of Chambers' abrupt departure.

== Plot ==
The episode opens with archive footage of Richard Webber (James Pickens Jr.)'s speech to the original interns in the pilot episode. It features Meredith Grey (Ellen Pompeo), Cristina Yang (Sandra Oh), Izzie Stevens (Katherine Heigl), Alex Karev (Justin Chambers) and George O'Malley (T. R. Knight). Meredith Grey then provides her signature episodic voice-over, telling a "lame joke" about a patient saying, "Hey doc, it hurts when I go like this" to which the doctor responds, "Well don't go like this" and says that while lame, "it is nonetheless true that as human beings, we cannot help but want to follow our own instincts, guts and primal urges no matter how much it hurts". A sequence follows, showing Jo Karev (Camilla Luddington), Miranda Bailey (Chandra Wilson) and Meredith Grey (Pompeo) receiving letters from Alex Karev (Chambers). As the three begin reading the letters, Alex (Chambers) provides voice-over of his written letters, declaring that he's not leaving, but has already left ― he is gone.

The episode then provides a retrospective of landmark storylines in the series integral to Alex's whole journey, from his arrogant, smart-mouth days in the early seasons to his maturation as a successful pediatrics surgeon, devoted friend and partner to Izzie and later Jo. It also shows flashbacks of his relationship with Izzie, her cancer battle and their wedding. It also shows flashbacks of the original five interns' friendship and Meredith's growing friendship with Alex throughout all sixteen seasons. Alex explains to Meredith that the form of a letter was not the way he wanted to say goodbye. He tells Meredith that she was always the one to set him straight, and it provides flashbacks to Alex having to face up to his problems, rather than run away. Alex then says he does not want to be set straight, or for Meredith to say the right thing, because the one right thing isn't in Seattle. Alex then reveals he is with Izzie (Katherine Heigl).

Following this revelation, flashbacks of Alex and Izzie's early relationship are shown. As this goes on, Alex reveals he contacted Izzie during Meredith's trial to maintain her medical license for a recommendation letter. He admits the trial gave him an excuse to finally contact Izzie, to know if she was alive and well. After brief exchange on the phone, Alex says he heard little voices in the background and asked if Izzie had kids and after a silence, she revealed that she did. And it turns out they are his children.

Alex Karev's (Justin Chambers) last physical appearance includes this scene in the 350th episode "My Shot".

Alex reveals Izzie was single, wanted kids and because the cancer nuked her eggs, she could not have biological children but she had their embryos. Flashbacks from the fifth season show Alex and Izzie's scenes revolving around the embryos. Alex explains he was too freaked out to care what she did with them so he signed papers off so that she could do whatever she wanted with them, as a flashback to Alex's worries of her surviving cancer is shown. He says he is aware he should have told Jo and Meredith, but instead of telling them, he got through the trial and went to see his children. His children ― twins named Alexis and Eli ― are described as "hilarious and stubborn" like Izzie, Alexis having Izzie's eyes and Eli's smile being crooked like his, that the kids want to be doctors and they bake like Izzie, and that he lives on a farm in the middle of no-where in Kansas. He also reveals Izzie works as a surgical oncologist and has made so much progress. Alex again says she could come up and bring him back to Seattle, but he hopes she does not do that and that he is finally where he should be, and that he has never had that before. Alex says he hopes when she is ready and not mad that she can come up and meet his children.

Flashbacks also show Jo and Alex's relationship, as well as Jo's own journey briefly, as Jo reads her letter from him. Alex details how deeply sorry he is, but that he is in love with Izzie as well. Alex admits the letter is the worst thing he is done, and that Jo has earned so much better, but also mentions the children he has with her. Alex tells Jo he felt he and Izzie had unfinished business and that they spoke as if no time had passed, that they were frozen in time. Alex says he needs to give the children the life he and Jo never had. Alex reveals he went to a lawyer, signed divorce papers and left her his shares at Grey Sloan.

Webber, at an AA meeting, relates Alex's situation with Jo and Izzie to Ellis and Adele, and that he wishes he got to see Maggie Pierce (Kelly McCreary) grow up, so he cannot be mad at him no matter how hard he wants to be, although admits his bitterness that he could not say goodbye simply as a teacher. It finally shows another sequence of Izzie and Alex's relationship, this time through dialogue of Izzie's declarations of love and finally shows the resemblance of Izzie's children to her.

Bailey talks to Ben (Jason George) about Joey, and relates the situation to Alex's upbringing. They decide to keep caring for him. Meanwhile, Jo swallows her emotions and decides to continue to work casually after reading the letter as Link (Chris Carmack) calls her his hero. Jo responds, "Mine too". The episode ends with Meredith talking to her daughter, Zola (Aniela Gumbs) and preparing to tell her that Uncle Alex is gone, with a voice-over of Meredith to say there really is no good way to say goodbye.

== Production ==
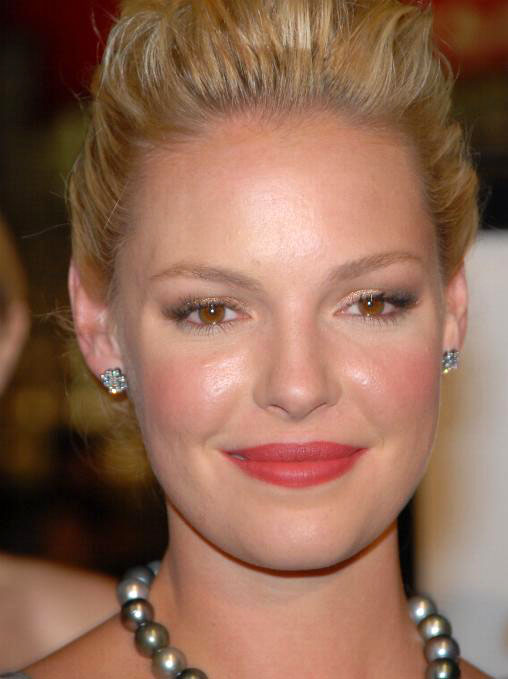
Katherine Heigl's long-departed character was a source of critical analysis, as Chambers' character's decision to leave his wife for her drew many wide-ranging responses.

The episode was written by Elisabeth Finch and directed by Debbie Allen. Several former characters appear in the episode through archive footage such as Izzie Stevens (Katherine Heigl), Denny Duquette (Jeffrey Dean Morgan), George O'Malley (T. R. Knight), Cristina Yang (Sandra Oh), Derek Shepherd (Patrick Dempsey), Shane Ross (Gaius Charles), Stephanie Edwards (Jerrika Hinton), Arizona Robbins (Jessica Capshaw), Helen Karev (Lindsay Wagner) and Jimmy Evans (James Remar). The only current main cast members that appeared in new scenes were Meredith Grey (Ellen Pompeo), Miranda Bailey (Chandra Wilson), Richard Webber (James Pickens Jr.), Jo Karev (Camilla Luddington) and Atticus "Link" Lincoln (Chris Carmack).

The episode re-visits Katherine Heigl's character, Izzie Stevens, for the first time in over 10 years. Alex and Izzie's storyline was left unresolved in the sixth season, after Heigl departed the series abruptly during her maternity leave. In a January 2010 episode, Stevens leaves after she is unable to repair things with Alex. Joan Rater, the episode's writer, explained that Stevens getting better propelled Karev to let her go. Izzie's absence after this was intended to be temporary, with the character returning in the season's final 5 episodes. However, Heigl did not show up for filming on March 1, 2010 for the season's twentieth episode. Heigl's 3-month family leave in Utah propelled her to quit the show entirely, feeling she needed more time to bond with her adoptive daughter. She explained, "So before I was due back, I spoke again to Shonda about wanting to leave. Then I waited at home until I was given the formal okay that I was off the show. The rumors that I refused to return were totally untrue." While Heigl felt the departure was “amicable”, despite the shock and feeling that something could have worked out, Heigl felt Izzie returning only to leave again after already having done so twice would "feel a little manipulative" and she felt that she had not created a bond with her adoptive daughter yet that made her feel like she needed her.

In August 2010, Rhimes stated that she did not feel Alex and Izzie's arc had fully concluded, and hoped to give proper closure to their relationship in the seventh season. She later confirmed that she had intended to kill off Izzie off-screen, but opted against this a day later as she felt that it would destroy Alex, rather than give him closure. Instead, she concluded: "I'm open to seeing Izzie again. So if she [Katherine] were to come back, we would be thrilled to [wrap up her story]. But if she doesn't, we'll just move on." While Heigl originally considered the idea of her returning bleak and considered the chapter closed, she later regretted it and expressed enthusiasm on returning in January 2012 but Rhimes, 2 months after, said that she was on a different track that they were not interested in changing. 4 months after, Rhimes cast Camilla Luddington as Jo Wilson, who became the new love interest for Chambers' character. 3 years later, Rhimes said she has completely moved on from the idea of Izzie coming back, "I’m done with that story. I’ve turned that idea over in my mind a thousand times and thought about how it would go. And I don’t think so."

Some fans were upset, particularly the Jolex shippers, that [Alex left Jo to be with Izzie] — and I understand why. But I would fight real hard anyone who tried to tell me that fans would not have been equally or more upset if I had killed Alex Karev off camera.”

— Vernoff on the decision to reunite Alex with Izzie after Chambers' abrupt exit.

After the season 16 finale, showrunner Krista Vernoff elaborated on the decision to choose Alex's send-off. “At the end of the day, there were 3 choices,” she explained to TVLine. “Kill Alex off camera; have Alex be alive and in Seattle — and still married to Jo — and we just never see him; or [reunite him] with Izzie.” She felt that killing Alex would have been “cruel to everyone — particularly Meredith and Jo,” Alex's best-friend and wife, respectively. “There was no way to not put those characters through gut-wrenching, ongoing grief if we had killed Alex off camera.” She also felt the second option would have done a disservice to Camilla Luddington who plays Chambers' TV wife. “It wasn’t fair to her to keep her married to a character who was off-screen,” Vernoff says. “It would absolutely eliminate [the chance for her to play] so many colors that she is so good at playing” and finally evaluated as a result that it “...wasn’t even a debate in the writers room,” adding that giving Alex a happy ending with Izzie “was so clearly the right course.”

Debbie Allen who directed the episode “fought really hard to cast and shoot the kids” according to Vernoff, explaining that it was not in the original script. She further commented, “And that was my favorite material in the episode — the visuals of those 2 kids.”

== Reception ==
=== Ratings ===
"Leave a Light On" was originally broadcast on March 5, 2020 in the United States on the American Broadcasting Company (ABC). The episode was watched by a total of 6.30 million viewers, surpassing the previous episode's 6 million. In the key 18-49 demographic, the episode scored a 1.3/7 rating/share, up two-tenths from the previous episode and the best since the mid-season premiere "Help Me Through the Night".

=== Reviews ===
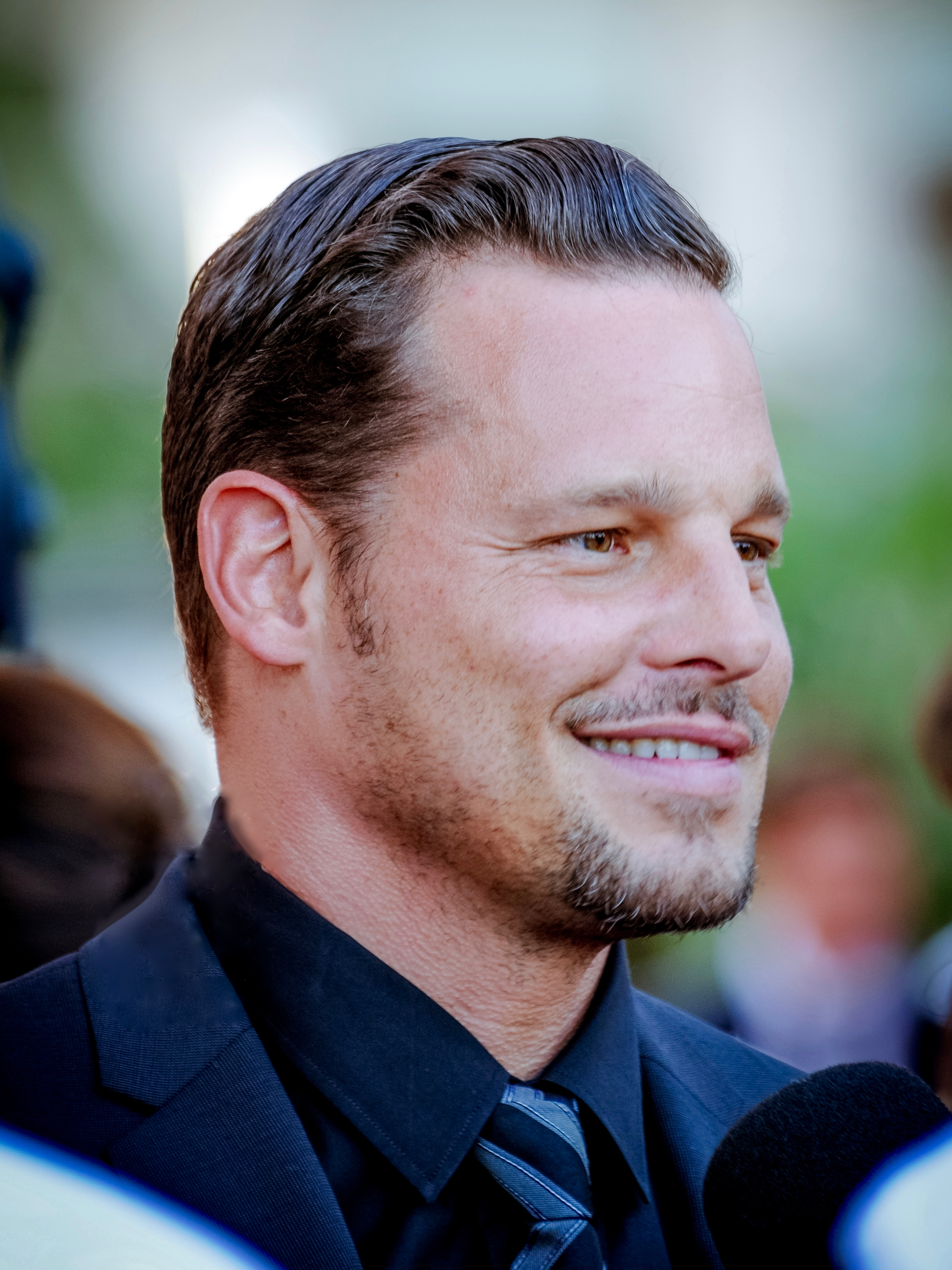
Justin Chambers made his final appearance as a series regular after 15 years on the show.

"Leave the Light On" received polarized reviews from television critics and fans alike, who were divided on the show's handling of Alex's exit, but many largely felt it made sense given the circumstances of Chambers' abrupt departure.

USA Today noted that the episode was "polarizing" to fans, and on discussing Alex's whole journey said, "He was there for us as we watched a succession of doctors depart the series. Karev was a constant; Where else would he go? After a rough upbringing, he craved stability – making the timing of his exit all the more perplexing. Then again: Maybe Izzie was that stability all along..."

Deadline noted "fan-favorite" Alex's ending's similarities to that of ER's Doug and Carol, played by George Clooney and Julianna Margulies respectively, "who also left the show at different times" and there "Carol also had given birth to the couple’s twins unbeknownst to Doug, with the couple eventually reuniting to live happily ever after with their kids".

In a 3-out-of-5-star review, Maggie Fremont for Vulture expressed disappointment that the "clip-show" exit showed no physical reunion between Izzie and Alex. Then Fremont elaborated, "It just felt like Alex dying, although tragic, would’ve been the only way to write the character off that made sense after everything he went through" and that "Alex Karev we’ve watched for — holy hell, almost 2 decades if we’re rounding up — wouldn’t do that" although admitted the exit "almost works", as Alex chooses to not miss a second with his children and to be a great dad, but that "Alex not being mad for one single second about the fact that Izzie had secret kids 5 years ago and never told him" made "less sense". Fremont also noted that Alex could have asked Jo to move to Kansas to help him be there for his children so that it was obviously "ALSO about the women he loves". She discussed the dramatic nature of Richard's speech saying, "I’m sorry, Richard’s speech is lovely and all, but he’s acting like he can’t just go to Kansas and see the guy. Richard thrives on that drama, you guys. Fremont also commented on Jo's reaction saying, "Poor Jo! And poor me for having to sympathize with a character I can’t stand, you know? Jo’s letter truly sucks", with both commenting on the impersonal nature of the letter."

Ashley Bissette Sumerel for Telltale-TV gave a moderately positive 3.5 out of 5 star review of the episode. She complimented how the writers worked with the circumstances of Chambers' abrupt departure feeling "[his] sudden exit meant the writers needed to change course and figure out the best way to write out his character, and I believe they did that, with a few exceptions" and said, I’d actually told a few people that there was one ending for Alex that I felt like I’d be able to accept, and lo and behold, this is it. The timing is terrible considering his relationship with Jo, but again, I think in this case, we do have to consider the circumstances."

Sonya Field for Hypable criticized the "unrealistic" storyline, feeling that it underscored Alex and Jo's story "because he was so ready to leave her". She opined that the Izzie/Alex flashbacks "bothered" her. She finished saying, "It worries me that this might mean the whole issue will largely be swept under the rug after this episode. It’s already upsetting to see how Alex was able to walk away from Jo so quickly, and I hope they at least handle things differently on Jo’s end."

Jasmine Blu for TV Fanatic gave a mostly negative response to the episode. They noted Meredith as being "self-absorbed" saying, "Meredith has been so far removed from the missing Alex storyline, and before that, she hasn't so much as visited him at Pac-North. Alex's final season had a startling lack of Merlex, so the final goodbye was even more bitter." while also acknowledging how no goodbye, short of death, would satisfy everyone. The reviewer criticized Alex's development in the episode saying, "Alex, who has spent years resenting people for abandoning him turned around and left those he loves. It's a struggle to wrap one's head around it." Blu also criticized Alex for seemingly using his sick mother as an alibi, and noted it as being uncharacteristic of the "straight-shooter" and "guy who tells it like it is whether you like it or not" that fans know him by. The reviewer also noted that it was "already a disservice that it took so long for anyone to pay attention to his absence" and that "Jo probably should've contacted his mother ages ago". Blu also criticized the storyline for how it will service Jo as a tragedy later, calling "Woe is Jo hours [...] irritating" and that "so much of Alex's storylines in the last few seasons have been playing second to Jo."
