= Elevator Love Letter =

Elevator Love Letter may refer to:

- "Elevator Love Letter" (song), a song by Stars from the album Heart
- "Elevator Love Letter" (Grey's Anatomy), episode of the American television medical drama Grey's Anatomy
