= Southeastern Local High School (South Charleston, Ohio) =

Location
- 195 East Jamestown Street; South Charleston, (Clark County), Ohio 45368; United States
- Coordinates: 39°49′33″N 83°37′58″W

Information
- Type: Public, Coeducational high school
- Superintendent: David Shea
- Principal: Tim Bell
- Teaching staff: 14.48 (FTE)
- Grades: 9–12
- Student to teacher ratio: 12.43
- Colors: Scarlet and Gray
- Athletics conference: Ohio Heritage Conference
- Team name: Trojans
- Website: https://www.sels.us/jrsr-high-school

Southeastern Local High School, also known as Southeastern High School, is the public school high school in South Charleston, Ohio. It is part of Southeastern Local Schools, which consists of Southeastern High School and Miami View Elementary School. The district's average daily student enrollment for the 2008–2009 school year was 849. The Ohio Department of Education has rated Southeastern as an "Effective" district for the 2008–2009 school year; the district met 28 out of 30 state indicators.

== Athletics ==
Southeastern's mascot is the Trojan. School colors are scarlet and gray.

=== Ohio High School Athletic Association State Championships ===
- Boys golf – 1987
- Boys track and field – 1997
- Girls basketball – 1996

== Notable alumni ==
- Justin Chambers, actor and former model
- Philip Caldwell, CEO and Chairman of Ford Motor Company
