= Izzie Stevens =

Fictional character from the television show Grey's Anatomy

- Grey's Anatomy character
- The Season 6 promotional photo of Katherine Heigl as Dr. Izzie Stevens
- First appearance: "A Hard Day's Night" (1.01); March 27, 2005
- Last appearance: "I Like You So Much Better When You're Naked" (6.12); January 21, 2010 (Note: Katherine Heigl was still credited through "Suicide is Painless" (6.18) March 25, 2010.) (as series regular) "Leave a Light On" (16.16); March 5, 2020 (body double)
- Created by: Shonda Rhimes
- Portrayed by: Katherine Heigl
- Season(s): 1 – 6; 16 (body double)

In-universe information
- Full name: Isobel Katherine Stevens
- Title: M.D.
- Occupation: Surgical intern (seasons 1–3); Surgical resident (seasons 4–6); Attending surgical oncologist (season 16)
- Family: Robbie Stevens (mother); Unnamed deceased maternal grandmother
- Spouse: Alex Karev (m. 2009, div. 2010; reconciled)
- Significant others: Hank (ex-boyfriend); Denny Duquette (ex-fiancé; deceased); George O'Malley (ex-boyfriend; deceased); Alex Karev (ex-husband, husband)
- Children: Alexis and Eli (twins; with Alex); Hannah Klein (biological daughter, placed for adoption aged 16)
- Religion: Catholicism
- Born: 1980

Isobel Katherine "Izzie" Stevens, M.D. is a fictional character from the medical drama television series Grey's Anatomy, which airs on the American Broadcasting Company (ABC) in the United States. The character was created by series producer Shonda Rhimes, and was portrayed by actress Katherine Heigl from 2005 to 2010. Introduced as a surgical intern at the fictional Seattle Grace Hospital, Izzie worked her way up to resident level, while her relationships with her colleagues Meredith Grey (Ellen Pompeo), Cristina Yang (Sandra Oh), Alex Karev (Justin Chambers) and George O'Malley (T. R. Knight) formed a focal point of the series.

Heigl garnered widespread critical acclaim for her performance as Izzie and received numerous awards and nominations for her role, winning Outstanding Supporting Actress in a Drama Series at the 59th Primetime Emmy Awards in 2007. Her win was particularly notable in the history of Grey's Anatomy, as Heigl remains the only cast member to have won an individual Primetime Emmy Award for acting for her performance in the series. Although the series itself has received and won multiple Emmy Awards across various categories, none of its other principal cast members have won an individual acting Emmy. She was critical of the character's development during the show's fourth season, particularly her romance with her on-screen best friend George. She declined to pursue a nomination for the 2008 Emmy Awards, citing insufficient material in the role. After speculation that Izzie would be killed off in the fifth season, the character was diagnosed with Stage 4 metastatic melanoma. She married Alex in the series' 100th episode, and afterwards, her tumor was successfully removed. Heigl made her final series regular appearance as Izzie in the sixth season, leaving Seattle after Alex refused to resume their marriage. The actress requested to be released from her contract 18 months early, in order to spend more time with her family. Ten years after her final appearance, the character's fate was revealed in a season 16 episode, where she makes a visual cameo re-appearance.

== Storylines ==
=== Background ===
Isobel Katherine "Izzie" Stevens (born 6/23/1981) is the daughter of a single mother named Robbie (Sharon Lawrence). They lived together in a trailer park, and Stevens was affectionately nicknamed "Cricket" by her mother. A teenage pregnant patient of hers named Cheyenne (Regine Nehy) identifies her trailer as being situated behind a church. Her maternal grandmother died of thyroid cancer sometime before her surgical residency. Growing up, Izzie was encouraged to go into the medical field by her high school biology teacher, Dr. Singer (Joel Grey).

When Izzie was 15, she became pregnant with her first biological child, Hannah Klein (Liv Hutchings) and this caused her to have friction with cheerleaders at her high school. In his Alzheimer's state, Dr. Singer recognizes the father of her child as a fellow high school student. She placed the child for adoption at age 16 after giving birth in 1996. Izzie privately named her daughter Sarah despite her adoptive parents naming her Hannah. Two years later, Stevens departed her hometown of Chehalis, Washington at age 18 and never returned until her third year of residency. After snooping through her file, Lexie Grey (Chyler Leigh) also discovers Stevens attended night school for college and consequently took six years to finish her undergraduate degree.

=== Summary ===
Izzie is introduced as a 25-year-old former model in the first episode of Grey's Anatomy, meeting fellow surgical interns Meredith, Cristina, Alex, and George. She and George move in with Meredith and become best friends. Izzie's boyfriend, hockey player Hank (Jonathan Scarfe), struggles to accept her new role as a surgeon, and the two break up. Izzie is hurt when Alex exposes her past as a lingerie model. However, the two later go on to begin a friendship, and then a romance. Alex experiences sexual dysfunction with Izzie and cheats on her with nurse Olivia Harper (Sarah Utterback). When Izzie finds out, she breaks up with him, though they briefly reunite following a bomb incident at the hospital. Izzie falls in love with cardiothoracic patient Denny Duquette (Jeffrey Dean Morgan), and the two become engaged. When Denny's condition deteriorates, Izzie deliberately worsens his health further by cutting his LVAD wire to move him up the UNOS donor register. Although Denny receives a new heart, he has a stroke hours later and dies. Upon his death, Izzie becomes the sole beneficiary of Denny's will, inheriting $8.7 million. She uses the money to open a free clinic at the hospital: the Denny Duquette Memorial Clinic.

Izzie disapproves of George's relationship with and marriage to orthopedic resident Callie Torres (Sara Ramirez). She and George sleep together, and attempt to keep their liaison a secret. George and resident Miranda Bailey (Chandra Wilson) are the only ones made aware that Izzie gave her child up for adoption at age 16. He supports Izzie when an 11-year-old Hannah, diagnosed with leukemia, arrives at Seattle Grace Hospital in need of a bone marrow transplant from Izzie. Izzie's feelings for George grow, and she reveals that she has fallen in love with him. The fourth season premiere "A Change Is Gonna Come" sees 28-year-old Stevens and her peers, except George, promoted to second-year residents. When Callie discovers George has been unfaithful, the two separate, and George and Izzie embark on a short-lived relationship, only to discover there is no real chemistry between them, and they decide to end their relationship and remain friends. Izzie supports Alex when he discovers his new girlfriend, Rebecca (Elizabeth Reaser) has psychiatric problems, and convinces him to have her committed. She is also handed primary responsibility for the clinic, as Bailey cuts back on her responsibilities.

Midway through second year, Izzie celebrates her 29th birthday. Around this timeframe, she and Alex have rekindled their intern year relationship but Izzie grows increasingly concerned when she begins hallucinating Denny. Ultimately she discovers she has Stage 4 metastatic melanoma that has already spread to her liver, skin and brain, causing the hallucinations. Her survival chances are estimated at only 5%. She is admitted to Seattle Grace as a patient. Bailey says Dr. Parker, an unseen obstetrician, will harvest healthy eggs before she undergoes any radiation so she has the option of having babies for later. Alex is upset about having to ejaculate into a cup to create embryos as he wanted them to have children naturally. Derek Shepherd (Patrick Dempsey) successfully removes a tumor from her brain, and Alex informs her he fertilized the eggs. Izzie spends her time in the hospital planning Meredith and Derek's wedding, but when her condition worsens and Derek discovers a second brain tumor, they give the ceremony to Izzie and Alex, who marry in front of all their friends. The procedure to remove the second tumor from Izzie's brain causes her to lose her short-term memory, and although she soon regains it, she flatlines moments later. Her friends ignore her DNR order and attempt to resuscitate her. She dreams herself on an elevator to the afterlife meeting George, who is also flatlining after being hit by a bus. Though George dies, Izzie is resuscitated and recovers enough to return to work.

Izzie is subsequently cut from the surgical program after making a treatment error that endangers the life of a patient. Believing Alex is to blame for her firing, she writes him a Dear John letter and leaves. After Meredith informs Izzie that Alex is moving on, she returns in a midway to make amends and apologize for her mistake in believing Alex was responsible for her firing. After a scan, she informs Alex that she no longer has cancer. Although he is pleased, Alex officially breaks up with Izzie, telling her that he loves her but deserves better. He then urges her to leave, be happy, and not come back. Thus Izzie leaves Seattle forever to start afresh.

=== Aftermath ===
Seven episodes after Izzie's final appearance in Season 6, Alex informs Meredith that Izzie has sent divorce papers, which he signs two episodes later in "How Insensitive". In the Season 6 finale, Alex is shot and, in his delirium, asks for Izzie, imagining that Lexie Grey is her. He pleads with her not to leave him again, reflecting his deep unresolved feelings for Izzie.

Izzie's presence continues to influence Alex throughout later seasons, particularly in his relationship with Jo Wilson (Camilla Luddington). In the Season 12, "I Choose You", Jo discovers an invoice from the fertility clinic that stored the embryos created when Izzie had cancer, sparking questions about whether Alex might have children with Izzie. In the Season 12 finale, Alex contemplates the idea of having just one soulmate, referring to Izzie, even as his relationship with Jo faces turbulence. The show's 300th episode, "Who Lives, Who Dies, Who Tells Your Story," features a character resembling Izzie, reminding Alex of his past. He admits to Jo that he never learned what became of Izzie, but prefers to imagine that she is living a happy life, married with children, always smiling.

The full story of Izzie's life post-Grey Sloan is revealed in the Season 16 episode "Leave a Light On". It is disclosed that Izzie pursued IVF using the embryos she and Alex had created, leading to the birth of twins, Alexis and Eli. Now a surgical oncologist, Izzie lives on a farm in Kansas, raising their children. Ten years after their divorce, Alex reconciles with Izzie, leaving his current life behind to be with her and their twins.

In the 400th episode, "You Are the Blood," Meredith reflects on her memories of the hospital, imagining Izzie in fragments of her past as she is named chief of surgery.

== Development ==
=== Casting and creation ===
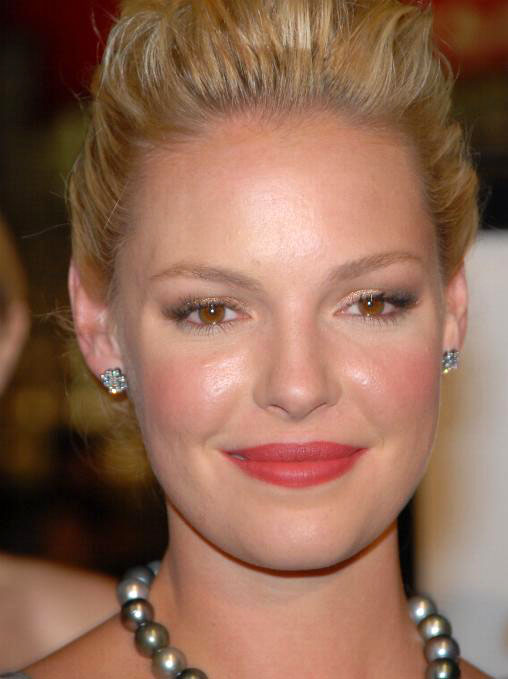
Heigl received acclaim from both audiences and critics for her portrayal of Izzie Stevens on Grey's Anatomy.

Izzie was created by Grey's Anatomy producer Shonda Rhimes, and Katherine Heigl was cast in the role. Heigl originally wanted to play Izzie as a brunette but was asked to keep her natural blonde hair for the character. For the audition, Heigl tried to give off a smart appearance by wearing a sweater, glasses, and putting her hair in a bun. She even considered dyeing her hair brunette to convince Rhimes and director Peter Horton that she could play a doctor. However, Horton noted that while they considered other actresses, "Katie came in and just ... obliterated it," and praised her for being both beautiful and an exceptional actress. The glasses Izzie wore in the pilot episode were dropped because of technical issues with lighting during shooting.

Heigl has admitted that her understanding of medical terminology was minimal, explaining that while she admired doctors, she was not as captivated by the medical world as some of her castmates. She also once expressed interest in a potential spin-off for her character Izzie when Kate Walsh's Addison Montgomery left Grey's Anatomy to star in Private Practice.

In 2008, Heigl declined to submit her name for consideration for a Primetime Emmy Award for her work in Grey's Anatomy's fourth season, stating that she felt the material she was given did not warrant a nomination. This led to speculation that her character would be killed off, especially after it was announced that Jeffrey Dean Morgan (who played Izzie's love interest, Denny Duquette) would return to the series despite his character's death. ABC's entertainment president, Steve McPherson, denied the rumors and emphasized that Izzie would have an important storyline that season.

In 2010, Heigl clarified her stance on the Emmy situation, expressing regret for how she had handled it. She called her 2007 win "the highlight of [her] career" and admitted she feared a "No comment" would make her sound disinterested. Reflecting on the situation, she acknowledged that her approach had been unfair to the writers.

Speculation about Heigl's future on the show resumed when Dean Morgan returned in Season 5, and cast member James Pickens Jr. commented that both Heigl and T. R. Knight were expected to leave the series. However, Pickens later retracted his statement. During Season 5, Izzie was diagnosed with Stage 4 metastatic melanoma, a storyline that left Heigl unsure of her character's fate. Despite rumors of her departure, it was confirmed in June 2009 that Heigl would return for Season 6, although her appearances were sporadic, with Izzie leaving and returning twice throughout the season.

=== Film project leave and maternity leave ===
Beginning in September 2009, Heigl was granted an extended leave from Grey's Anatomy for five episodes of Season 6, spanning from episode six, "I Saw What I Saw", to episode eleven, "Blink". This leave was to accommodate her role in the romantic comedy film Life As We Know It (2010), marking her first project as an executive producer. Heigl's exit was strategically timed to coincide with lead actress Ellen Pompeo’s maternity leave and shortly after T. R. Knight's departure from the series. Showrunner Shonda Rhimes acknowledged the inevitable departures, stating, "Eventually, everybody is going to leave the show", and emphasized the need to explore the show's longevity beyond the existing characters.

While Pompeo's titular character, Meredith Grey, was given reduced screentime with some scenes filmed in advance for future episodes, Izzie received a purposeful exit storyline. In the fifth episode of Season 6, "Invasion", Izzie is fired from her position and leaves her husband, Alex Karev, by sending him a Dear John letter. Following her dismissal, Izzie is absent for the next three episodes but makes a brief return in the ninth episode, "New History", before departing again. After the release of the eleventh episode, "Blink", Heigl concluded her work on Life As We Know It and returned for the twelfth episode, "I Like You So Much Better When You're Naked", which was scheduled to air in January 2010.

In November 2009, it was announced that Heigl had taken an indefinite, extended maternity leave to care for her adopted daughter. Consequently, the twelfth episode served as a further phasing out of her character. It was later revealed that her leave would be three months long, and Rhimes confirmed that Heigl would not shoot scenes in advance for her character as Pompeo did for Meredith Grey.

=== Decision to leave ===
On March 1, 2010, Katherine Heigl was scheduled to return to the set of Grey's Anatomy to shoot the twentieth episode of the sixth season and the following four episodes. However, after months of ongoing negotiations between Heigl and ABC, both sides mutually agreed to part ways earlier than originally planned, which was publicly announced on March 11, 2010. Heigl had been in discussions with showrunner Shonda Rhimes about her departure and waited at home in Utah until she was given formal confirmation that she would no longer be part of the series.

Heigl requested to be released from her contract 18 months early and to make her final appearance retroactively in the twelfth episode of the sixth season, "I Like You So Much Better When You're Naked", which aired on January 21, 2010. Reflecting on this episode, Heigl stated that while it was not intended to be Izzie's farewell, it "oddly works as a bookend to Izzie's story".

"Even though there's a part of me that would like to go back and do the quick Izzie farewell, I also think that my last scene — where Meredith says to Izzie, 'Please don't go, This is your home,' and Izzie's response was, 'No it’s not, not anymore it’s just a place I worked and I can do that anywhere' — was kind of tragic and appropriate all at the same time. When I was playing the scene, I was really trying to convey that, for Izzie, that was a lie that she had to tell herself to have the courage to have to move on."

There were conflicting reports regarding Heigl's readiness to return to work. While some sources claimed she was at home and prepared to return on March 1, others indicated that the situation was more complicated. In 2020, Grey's Anatomy head writer Krista Vernoff revealed that she had written a farewell episode centered on Izzie, but it was canceled after the production received news that Heigl would not return to complete the arc. However, Heigl's camp disputed this, maintaining that she was in Los Angeles and waiting to be called to set.

On March 24, 2010, Heigl confirmed that her decision to leave the show was due to a shift in her personal priorities, as she wanted to spend more time with her adoptive child and no longer desired to work full-time. She also believed it would be unfair to fans for Izzie to return and leave again, having already done so twice earlier in the season. Heigl finalized her agreement with ABC and expressed gratitude for the efforts to find a gracious way to conclude her time on the show.

Although Heigl was credited in the eighteenth episode, "Suicide is Painless", it became her final appearance despite her absence from the episode. By the nineteenth episode, "Sympathy for the Parents", Heigl's name was officially removed from the main cast, and Kim Raver, who played Dr. Teddy Altman, was added as a series regular following her promotion in January 2010.

=== Post-exit ===
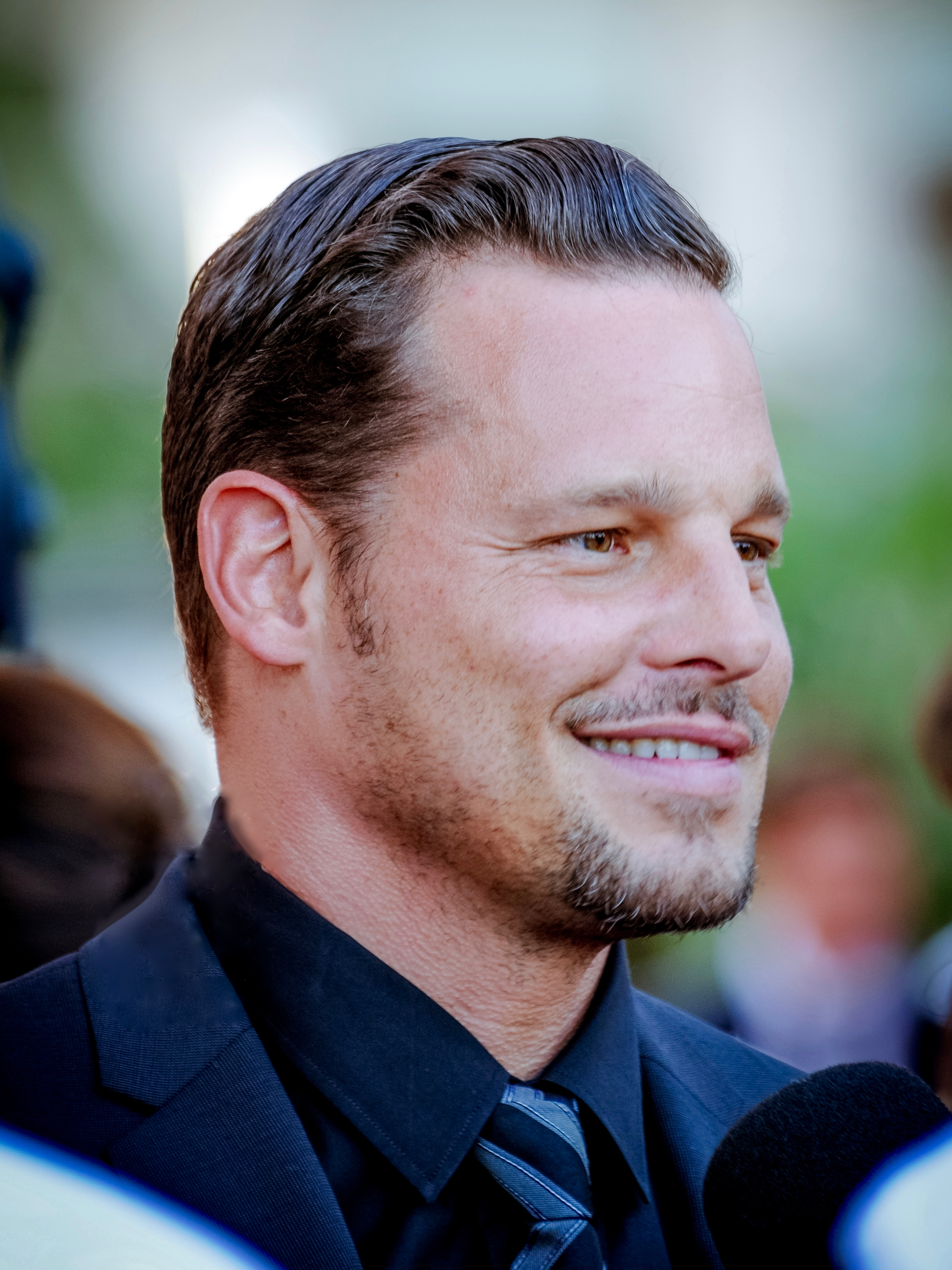
Heigl said she felt "attached to [Chambers]", and their characters "being together" which she felt was "supposed to be, but you can't have it all" in an October 2010 interview.

In August 2010, Rhimes stated that she did not feel Izzie's character arc—specifically her relationship with Alex—had fully concluded, and hoped to give proper closure to their relationship in the seventh season. She later confirmed that she had intended to kill off Izzie off-screen, but opted against this a day later as she felt that it would destroy Alex, rather than give him closure. Instead, she concluded: "I'm open to seeing Izzie again. So if she [Katherine] were to come back, we would be thrilled to [wrap up her story]. But if she doesn't, we'll just move on." In the How to Save a Life: The Inside Story of Grey's Anatomy (2021) book, former writer Jenna Bans stated that Izzie was kept alive because "Shonda [Rhimes] felt like that was more of an unexpected way to go."

Heigl also went on to say in October 2010 that a return looked bleak because she could not think of "any way that [Izzie] could come back gracefully that wouldn't just feel manipulative". She stated it was "hard" because she wonders "what she's doing and where she is and what happened, but that is over for me now", and expressed further admiration for her on-screen husband, Chambers and their characters' romantic coupling.

However, in January 2012, Heigl stated in an interview that she has asked the producers if she could return to the show to give closure to Izzie's storyline: "I've told them I want to [return]," she said. "I really, really, really want to see where [Izzie] is. I just want to know what happened to her and where she went and what she's doing now. My idea is that she actually like figures it out, and finds some success and does really well in a different hospital. She was always floundering you know, and so she was always one step behind the eight ball and I want to see that girl take some power back." She later went on to say that she regrets leaving the show, "Oh yeah, sometimes, yeah. You miss it. I miss my friends. It was a great work environment... and it becomes a family. I spent six years together with these people every day... you grow up together, in a way," and again commented on Izzie's possibly returning to the show, "I always felt that if they wanted me to come back and sort of wrap up that storyline... I want them to know that I'm down with it if they want me to, but I completely understand if it doesn't necessarily work... They've got a lot of story lines going on there." But in March 2012, Shonda Rhimes said that there are no plans at the moment for the character to return, "I think it was really nice to hear her appreciating the show. At the same time we are on a track we have been planning. The idea of changing that track is not something we are interested in right now." 3 years later, Rhimes said she has completely moved on from the idea of Izzie coming back, "I’m done with that story. I’ve turned that idea over in my mind a thousand times and thought about how it would go. And I don’t think so."

After her exit, Izzie makes uncredited archive footage re-appearances in "Flight", "Leave A Light On" and "You Are the Blood". For the 300th episode, "Who Lives, Who Dies, Who Tells Your Story", showrunner Krista Vernoff wanted to incorporate a nostaglia-fuelled storyline. Izzie returned "in spirit" for the episode with a doppelganger character, Liza (portrayed by Eryn Rea), alongside George and Cristina doppelgangers, Greg and Cleo. Initially, Vernoff pitched to Rhimes (who still had executive producer privileges) an original main cast member from the pilot returning as the focal point storyline for the episode after noticing the Izzie lookalike actress, Eryn Rea (who was a Meredith stand-in) through the camera during the early-fourteenth season scenes shot in Seattle. Vernoff observed:

"Every time I walked past the camera, I gasped because I felt like I had traveled back in time. She looked so much like first-season Izzie to me. ... We were talking about: Can we get one of the originals, that’s obviously where you start. Well, no you can’t, you try and you can’t and there are a million reasons why you can’t. So you move on. Then it becomes a conversation of how do we get the feeling of a visit from the originals without a visit from the originals."

The original cast member was heavily rumored to be Heigl, and Vernoff further stated she was unable to allow the cast member to return for a "million reasons", remaining tight-lipped about who the series regular was to be. She then pitched a storyline about "doppelgangers" which was approved instead.

In 2020, showrunner Krista Vernoff discussed the possibility of Chambers and Heigl returning together after the former's off-screen departure stating, "When I left the show in season 6, people asked me if there was any chance of me ever coming back. “I was smart enough to say, ‘Never say never.’ Here I am, so who knows?” In 2021, Heigl herself said she did not know if she would ever re-appear in the series, but also said "never say never".

=== Characterization ===
Heigl believes that the writers of Grey's Anatomy incorporated aspects of the actors' personalities into their roles, making Izzie a "super-moral" version of herself. Heigl explained that the fifth episode of Season 2, "Bring the Pain", was pivotal for Izzie's character development, marking her transformation from being vulnerable and underestimated in the pilot to removing her "heart from her sleeve". This episode, originally intended to close the first season, brought Izzie's arc "full-circle," according to Shonda Rhimes.

In a 2006 Cosmopolitan interview, Heigl described Izzie as "immensely kind and patient". The character underwent significant changes after the death of her love interest, Denny Duquette, in the Season 2 finale, "Losing My Religion". Rhimes noted that Denny's death forced Izzie to abandon her idealism, and Heigl felt that this tragedy showed that Izzie might not be cut out to be a doctor. However, executive producer Betsy Beers emphasized that Denny's death served to mature Izzie, with Heigl agreeing that by the start of Season 3, Izzie was trying to regain her optimism despite the harsh realities of life.

One of Rhimes' favorite moments, highlighting Izzie's competitive and slightly mischievous side, occurred when Callie Torres, George's love interest, urinates in front of Izzie and Meredith. Rhimes loved how Izzie subtly "tortures" Callie about washing her hands afterward, capturing the small, humorous interactions that reflect everyday social dynamics.

Discussing Izzie's relationship with Alex in a 2006 Cosmopolitan interview, Heigl assessed that "Even when Alex was a complete dirtbag to her [Izzie], she forgave him and gave him another chance. And he really screwed her over. ... To go for a guy like that is to say I want to be damaged.'" Writer Stacy McKee deemed Izzie's moving on from Alex to patient Denny Duquette "karma", as Alex previously treated Izzie badly, yet as he begins to realize his true feelings, he is forced to watch her embark on a romance with "the undeniably-handsome-and-totally-charming" Denny. Series writer Blythe Robe commented on Izzie and Denny: "I love the way Izzie lights up when she's around him. I love their relationship because it's so pure and honest and completely game free." Writer Elizabeth Klaviter noted at this time the way Izzie "seems to be sacrificing her reputation because of her feelings for Denny." When Izzie deliberately worsened Denny's condition to move him up the transplant list, series writer Mark Wilding questioned the morality of the actions, asking: "is Izzie bad for doing it? Is she tremendously irresponsible? She cut the LVAD wire for love, so does that make her action understandable?"

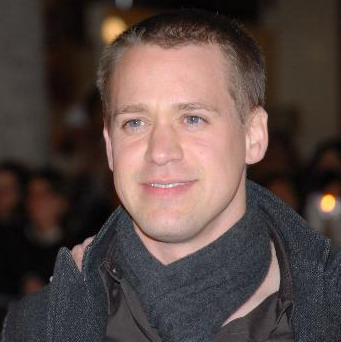
Heigl was critical of Izzie's relationship with George (T. R. Knight), deeming it "a ratings-ploy".

Rhimes discussed costuming choices in the scene which saw the interns gather around Denny's deathbed, explaining: "Meredith, George, Cristina, Callie and Alex are all dressed, not for a prom, but for a funeral. Everyone in dark colors, everyone dressed sombrely. As if they were in mourning. Only Izzie is in happy pink. Only Izzie looks like she didn’t know this was coming." Following Denny's death, Heigl approached Rhimes to ask when her character would next have a romantic liaison. Rhimes explained that "Izzie doesn't sleep around". Heigl expressed a desire for Izzie to reunite with Alex, explaining: "I believe on some level, there's a connection between Izzie and Alex. He can do honorable things even though he's cutting and sarcastic. I would like to ultimately see them together, if not this season, then next."

Yahoo! Voices wrote that Stevens in the third season "has become more condescending and passive-aggressive herself, more than anyone else." Heigl was critical of her character's development in the show's fourth season, particularly her affair with George, which she deemed "a ratings-ploy". Heigl explained: "They really hurt somebody, and they didn't seem to be taking a lot of responsibility for it. I have a really hard time with that kind of thing. I'm maybe a little too black and white about it. I don't really know Izzie very well right now. She's changed a lot." Attempting to rationalise Izzie's actions, Heigl later assessed that:

People who are so infallible, perfect and moral tend to be the first to slip and fall. But I would love to see how she deals with the consequences of what she's done, because what’s interesting is when people make decisions that shake their world, they suddenly have to go, 'Woo, I didn't know I was capable of this.' I'd like to see Izzie take some culpability.

In June 2010, Heigl spoke of her character after departing amid the sixth season stating, "I felt very protective of Izzie. I really loved her. I felt she was an admirable woman who certainly made mistakes. But I was starting to not like her, and that bothered me."

== Reception ==
In his evaluation of her Emmy chances, Variety's Stuart Levine praised Heigl's ability to capture Izzie's emotional extremes, writing: "Heigl has little difficulty reaching Izzie's highest highs and lowest lows." He commended her for handling the intense storylines given to her by showrunner Shonda Rhimes but also pointed out that "there are times when Izzie becomes completely irrational during crisis situations, which may bother some."

Eyder Peralta of The Houston Chronicle was highly critical of Izzie's decision to cut Denny's LVAD wire in Season 2, deeming it unethical. He expressed frustration that Izzie did not face greater consequences for her actions, writing that it was the reason he stopped watching the show. He questioned her continued presence in medicine, stating: "the super-hot blond chick can make an earth-shattering, fatal decision and she doesn't get canned."

In Season 3, Robert Rorke of the New York Post praised Izzie, calling her the "heart-and-soul" of the show and its heroine. He highlighted her as a "calming presence" in contrast to the turmoil she experienced following the death of her fiancé, Denny Duquette. Rorke appreciated the depth Izzie's character had developed, stating that she seemed like "the only adult intern" at Seattle Grace, aside from Dr. Miranda Bailey, played by Chandra Wilson.

The Season 4 romance between Izzie and George O'Malley was highly unpopular among viewers, leading to a backlash, particularly from fans who favored Izzie's relationship with Alex Karev. Another controversial storyline came in Season 5 with the return of Izzie's deceased fiancé, Denny, and the continuation of their romance in a supernatural form. This plot was met with high criticism, with Mary McNamara of the Los Angeles Times calling it "the world's worst storyline." McNamara even argued that Izzie should have died during the fifth season finale episode "Now or Never", in which she flatlines after neurosurgery. However, the episode where Izzie marries long-term love Alex drew 15.3 million viewers, the highest-rated episode of the night.

Izzie's cancer storyline in Season 5 garnered a mixed response from the medical community. Otis Brawley, chief medical officer at the American Cancer Society, critiqued the storyline for its unrealistic depiction of treatment options. Specifically, he pointed out that Izzie's use of interleukin-2 as a treatment for metastatic melanoma with brain involvement was not medically accurate, as the drug is known to cause complications like bleeding and strokes in such cases. In reality, radiosurgery would be the recommended course of action for patients with melanoma that has spread to the brain. On the other hand, Tim Turnham, executive director of the Melanoma Research Foundation, praised the show for raising public awareness about melanoma. He highlighted how the storyline brought attention to the importance of prevention, early detection, and research.

Izzie's off-screen reunion with Alex in Season 16 was met with mixed reactions from fans. Deadline noted similarities between Alex and Izzie's storyline and the ending of ER's Doug (George Clooney) and Carol (Julianna Margulies), where both characters left the show separately, only to reunite later when it was revealed that Carol had given birth to their twins.

Fox News included Izzie in its list of "The Best TV Doctors for Surgeon General". She also featured in Wetpaint's "10 Hottest Female Doctors on TV" and BuzzFeed's "16 Hottest Doctors on Television".

== Awards ==
Heigl's portrayal of Izzie Stevens earned her widespread critical acclaim and several prestigious nominations and awards. In 2006, she was part of the Grey's Anatomy ensemble that won the Satellite Award for Best Ensemble in a Television Series. She was nominated for the Golden Globe Award for Best Supporting Actress – Series, Miniseries or Television Film at both the 2007 and 2008 ceremonies for her work on Grey's Anatomy. Additionally, Heigl won the "Favorite Female TV Star" at the 34th People's Choice Awards, and was awarded the Primetime Emmy Award for Outstanding Supporting Actress in a Drama Series at the 2007 ceremony. Her Emmy win is notable in the history of Grey's Anatomy, as Heigl is the only lead cast member of the series to have won an individual Primetime Emmy Award for acting. Despite Grey's Anatomy receiving numerous Emmy nominations and wins throughout its run, none of the other principal cast members have won an individual Primetime Emmy for their performances in the series. Additionally, she was also part of the ensemble cast nominated for the Screen Actors Guild Award for Outstanding Performance by an Ensemble in a Drama Series from 2006 to 2008, with a victory in 2007.
