= Grey's Anatomy season 16 =

Grey's Anatomy
- Season 16
- DVD cover art for the sixteenth season of Grey's Anatomy
- Showrunners: Krista Vernoff; Shonda Rhimes
- Starring: Ellen Pompeo; Justin Chambers; Chandra Wilson; James Pickens Jr.; Kevin McKidd; Jesse Williams; Caterina Scorsone; Camilla Luddington; Kelly McCreary; Giacomo Gianniotti; Kim Raver; Greg Germann; Jake Borelli; Chris Carmack
- No. of episodes: 21

Release
- Original network: ABC
- Original release: September 26, 2019 – April 9, 2020

Season chronology
- ← Previous; Season 15 Next → Season 17

The sixteenth season of the American television medical drama Grey's Anatomy was ordered on May 10, 2019, by American Broadcasting Company (ABC). The season premiered on September 26, 2019. The season is produced by ABC Studios, in association with Shondaland Production Company and Entertainment One Television; the showrunner being Krista Vernoff.

The season's main storylines include the recently fired Dr. Meredith Grey (Ellen Pompeo)'s impending trial to fight for her medical license and her on-off again love-life with surgical resident, Andrew DeLuca (Giacomo Gianniotti), who begins to spiral into bipolar mania. Alex Karev (Justin Chambers) and Richard Webber (James Pickens Jr.) also begin working at Pac-North after being fired by Chief Miranda Bailey (Chandra Wilson). Other storylines include Teddy Altman (Kim Raver)'s affair with Tom Koracick (Greg Germann) in the wake of her engagement to Owen Hunt (Kevin McKidd); Amelia Shepherd (Caterina Scorsone)'s surprise pregnancy, with the baby's paternity brought into question; Jackson Avery (Jesse Williams) and Maggie Pierce (Kelly McCreary)'s break up; Miranda Bailey's miscarriage; and Jo Karev (Camilla Luddington)'s emergence from the psychiatric ward after treatment.

This is the final season to feature Dr. Alex Karev, portrayed by Justin Chambers as a series-regular, whose announced departure was made in January 2020. His final physical appearance was the milestone 350th episode "My Shot" in November 2019. Following this, he abruptly left the series. However, Vernoff was able to bring him back for voice-over in a farewell episode, explaining where the character ended up. This episode "Leave a Light On" became the season's most-discussed and analyzed episode, with Chambers' character's departure after 16 years receiving a polarizing response from audiences. However, it drew a ratings upswing, shooting up its best ratings in 6 weeks since its mid-season premiere. It also re-visited Katherine Heigl's character, Izzie Stevens who departed mid-way through the sixth season.

On March 12, 2020, the production of the sixteenth season was suspended due to the COVID-19 pandemic in the United States. 21 out of the original 25 episode order were completed before production was suspended. On March 27, 2020, it was announced that the twenty-first episode would serve as the season finale. The season finale, which aired on April 9, 2020, ended with 7.33 million viewers, an improvement from the previous season's 5.99 million viewership, and became the first season to not end in May in all of its 15 years.

The website Screen Rant ranked the season #16 on their 2023 ranking of the 19 Grey's Anatomy seasons.

== Episodes ==
The number in the "No. overall" column refers to the episode's number within the overall series, whereas the number in the "No. in season" column refers to the episode's number within this particular season. "U.S. viewers in millions" refers to the number of Americans in millions who watched the episodes live. Each episode of this season is named after a song.

No. overall	No. in season	Title	Directed by	Written by	Original release date	Prod. code	U.S. viewers (millions)
343	1	"Nothing Left to Cling To"	Debbie Allen	Krista Vernoff	September 26, 2019	1601	6.51
Alex drops Jo off at a psychiatric facility for her 30-day stay; after revealing that they never officially signed a marriage license, Jo gives Alex an out, but he proves to her he's in it for the long haul. Still stuck in the fog, Maggie searches for Jackson and finds him helping two rock climbers who have fallen down a cliff. While that couple recovers, Jackson and Maggie break up, and Jackson tries to move on with firefighter Vic. Owen's many attempts to help a frazzled Teddy with their newborn, Allison, makes things worse until he shows her how much he wants to be with her. After Meredith admits she was the one behind the insurance fraud, Andrew is released from jail, and Meredith is sentenced to court-ordered community service with her medical license in jeopardy. Following his firing from the hospital, Richard gets a job making house visits, while Koracick is promoted to Chief Medical Officer of the Fox Foundation, much to Bailey's dismay. As Amelia and Link’s relationship continues to heat up, Amelia gets hit with a big surprise.
344	2	"Back in the Saddle"	Kevin McKidd	Meg Marinis	October 3, 2019	1602	6.08
Meredith learns that her medical-board hearing will only be in three months. In the meantime, after she detects cancer in her community service supervisor, Robin, Meredith decides to publish about inequality in the healthcare system. Alex is appointed Chief at PacNorth and offers Jo a job at PacNorth, where she would have free rein over her own fellowship, but Jo decides to take a position as an attending at Grey Sloan after giving Bailey an ultimatum. Amelia tells Link about her pregnancy and difficult past with Christopher, and though they both voice their fears, they decide to keep the baby. Koracick and Owen continue to be at odds with one another; by the end of the day, Koracick gets a restraining order against Owen after he accidentally gets tasered. Andrew accuses Bailey of choosing Helm over him to perform a surgery due to his relationship with Meredith, and Jackson and Maggie navigate through their post-breakup woes.
345	3	"Reunited"	Michael Medico	Andy Reaser	October 10, 2019	1603	6.09
In her first surgery as an attending, Jo must convince Meredith's patient to have the procedure without her; as a compromise, the surgeons video chat Meredith in. After the surgery, Qadri confronts Bailey about firing Meredith, which gets herself fired as well. While trying to avoid Koracick, Owen and Teddy take newborn Allison for a tour around the hospital before Owen tells Teddy she should go back to work. A disoriented Korean woman arrives at the hospital in search of her long lost love, who is also a patient. Andrew covers up an accident Schmitt makes in surgery to teach him a lesson. Amelia debates over when she and Link should tell people about the baby, while things heat up between Jackson and Vic following their hiking trip. At PacNorth, two estranged sisters reunite and have to decide whether to pull the plug on their sister who has been declared brain-dead. After he is unable to get a hold of Catherine, Richard decides to have dinner with his old friend, Gemma.
346	4	"It's Raining Men"	Michael Watkins	Mark Driscoll	October 17, 2019	1604	5.75
When Meredith's tell-all article about the dark side of the health care system goes viral, Grey Sloan gets its reputation put on the line. A furious Bailey reluctantly names Andrew chief resident after the previous one quits, sending her into a presumed panic attack. Koracick offers the family of a paediatric plastics patient a free surgery in exchange for good publicity for the hospital, which causes a rift between him and Jackson. Maggie and Teddy treat a woman who was hit by a stowaway that fell out of a moving airplane, while Link tries to calm down the woman's traumatized boyfriend. After spending the day with Alex and Richard, Owen cuts his paternity-leave short and accepts a job at PacNorth as the Head of Trauma. Link tells Amelia he's falling in love with her, while Meredith and Andrew fight about her self-destructive behavior that has landed her in trouble with the court again. Bailey discovers that she has been having symptoms all day because she is pregnant.
347	5	"Breathe Again"	Chandra Wilson	Elisabeth R. Finch	October 24, 2019	1605	6.10
When Zola is in need of an operation to repair her shunt for her spina bifida, Meredith skips out on her court date for her missing community service hours. While Koracick performs surgery on Zola, Meredith vents her doubts about her relationship with Andrew to her sisters, and Amelia worries that she does not know Link well enough to be having a baby with him. Bailey and Jo treat Jo's former therapist from her time in the psychiatric institution, forcing Jo to recall the month she spent there. Richard has breakfast with his old sobriety friend, Gemma, and after he tells her how absent Catherine has been lately, Gemma kisses him, which he rebuffs. Bailey tells Ben that she is pregnant, and he responds ecstatically. Zola has a successful surgery, but because Meredith failed to show up in court, her lawyer tells her she will make up her remaining hours in jail.
348	6	"Whistlin' Past the Graveyard"	Pete Chatmon	Julie Wong	October 31, 2019	1606	5.66
Meredith gets a reality check in prison when she learns how her cellmate, Paula, landed herself behind bars. Alex and Richard attempt to impress potential investors at PacNorth, only to discover that the hospital is built over a graveyard, while Jo spends the day trying to scare people with her Halloween costume. At Grey Sloan, Bailey struggles with her pregnancy hormones as she and Teddy discuss Halloween costumes for their children. After being in a bad mood all day, Koracick reveals to Bailey that he hates Halloween because his son had died two weeks before the holiday. Jackson and Andrew treat a young girl with severe burns from the sunlight as Andrew tries to figure out why Zola is upset with him. When Zola finally opens up and tells him she misses her dad, Andrew tells her stories about what a great surgeon Derek was. Amelia and Link have lunch with his parents, who reveal that they are getting remarried, upsetting Link, as he spent years going back and forth between the two.
349	7	"Papa Don't Preach"	Daniel Willis	Jalysa Conway	November 7, 2019	1607	6.16
Maggie gets a big surprise when her cousin, Sabie, who is also Richard's niece, shows up at the hospital with a large tumor around her heart. While the two realize how much they have in common, Sabie does not want Maggie operating on her due to conflict of interest. Although Maggie insists that she is the best person for the job and eventually gets Sabie's father's permission to perform the surgery, she loses Sabie in the operating room due to blood clotting. Feeling guilty, Maggie is forced to share the bad news with Sabie's father, further alienating the family from Richard, who is already at odds with Catherine over his perceived affair with Gemma. Meanwhile, Amelia shows up at PacNorth to tell Owen that she and Link are having a baby, and he does not take it well. While they treat a pregnant woman who has fallen down the stairs after attempting to get an abortion, Owen takes his anger out on the patient before he and Amelia resolve their issues through a heart-to-heart.
350	8	"My Shot"	Debbie Allen	Meg Marinis	November 14, 2019	1608	6.34
Meredith realizes one of the judges on the panel to determine the fate of her medical license, Dr. Paul Castello, is the doctor who neglected to get a head CT for Derek that led to his death. Andrew, Owen and Alex give positive testimonies, while the opposing council counteract with Meredith's wrongdoings in the hospital over the years. When Paul brings up Zola, Meredith confronts him about killing her husband, causing him to seizure. He does not recover and dies at Grey Sloan. The trial is postponed until Alex brings dozens of Meredith's former patients in to give statements. Meredith gets to keep her license and is offered her job back at Grey Sloan by Bailey, which she accepts. After the trial, Jackson tries to make a move on Maggie, who is still wallowing in Sabie's death; Schmitt is ostracized by the other residents after it is revealed he was the one who accidentally turned Meredith in to Bailey; and Andrew breaks up with Meredith when he realizes that she does not respect him the way she did Derek.
351	9	"Let's All Go to the Bar"	Kevin McKidd	Kiley Donovan	November 21, 2019	1609	6.40
Meredith clashes with the new Head of Pediatrics, Dr. Cormac Hayes, over a patient Meredith has treated in the past. She later learns that Cristina sent Hayes to Meredith as a present, dubbing him "McWidow" due to the loss of his wife. Amelia and Bailey bond over their pregnancies until Bailey has a miscarriage and Amelia learns that she is further along than she thought, questioning the paternity. Jo volunteers for a safe haven program and cares for an abandoned baby at Station 19; she later tells Link she brought the baby home. Schmitt continues to be shunned by the other residents and seeks comfort in Nico. Catherine learns that Jackson broke up with Maggie and is now dating Vic, prompting Catherine to vent her suspicions about Richard cheating. Owen shows a prospective new doctor around PacNorth, while Richard is distracted by Gemma constantly showing up. At the end of the day, many of the doctors hang out at Joe's Bar until a car crashes through the wall.
352	10	"Help Me Through the Night"	Allison Liddi-Brown	Lynne E. Litt	January 23, 2020	1610	6.66
The doctors rush to save several of the residents involved in the bar crash. Bailey and Richard operate on Helm as Richard attempts to comfort Bailey following her miscarriage. Meredith works on Schmitt after he collapses and assures him that she forgives him for turning her into Bailey. While Amelia wrestles with telling Link about her baby news and Teddy vents about Owen still not proposing, the two look for Parker, who has gone missing due to PTSD triggered by the crash. Jackson and Owen perform surgery on Simms while being closely monitored by Koracick, while Jo bonds with Hayes over her Safe Haven baby. After all the residents are in the clear, Owen proposes to Teddy, much to Tom's dismay, and Amelia reveals to Link that they are having a boy. At Meredith's house, Andrew tells Maggie he made a mistake breaking up with Meredith just as Maggie learns she is being sued for Sabie's death. Note: This episode concludes a crossover event that begins on Station 19 season 3 episode 1.
353	11	"A Hard Pill to Swallow"	Michael Medico	Adrian Wenner	January 30, 2020	1611	5.56
Amelia finally tells Link that she is unsure if he or Owen is the father of her baby, and after taking time to think, Link says he wants a paternity test before they decide where they stand as a couple. Meredith learns more about Hayes’ past as they work on a teen who has collapsed from vaping, while she struggles with her lingering feelings for Andrew, who is also at a loss for answers on a mystery patient, Suzanne. Teddy admits to Owen that she lost her engagement ring, and they spend the day searching for it until they discover Leo has swallowed it. Link, Jo, and Jackson operate on a man who swallowed a fish during his bachelor party, while Koracick continuously bothers Bailey about her time off before learning it was to grieve her miscarriage. Richard attempts to get Maggie out of her funk while also dealing with his own marital problems with Catherine.
354	12	"The Last Supper"	Nicole Rubio	Jason Ganzel	February 6, 2020	1612	5.47
In a recipe for disaster, Jackson and Maggie attempt to be civil towards one another for Catherine and Richard's anniversary dinner. Jackson invites Vic, who also brings along her friend, Dean, as a blind date for Maggie, only without telling her first. After dinner gets off to an awkward start, things are made worse when Jackson and Maggie cannot stop bickering, prompting Catherine to announce that she and Richard are actually separating. Though the dinner gives them a chance to reminisce and consider reconciliation, the night ends with Catherine determined to buy PacNorth from Richard in spite. Meanwhile, Schmitt and Nico visit Schmitt's uncle, who is in hospice. After coming out to his uncle right before he passes, Schmitt learns that his uncle was actually a closeted gay and in an extramarital affair with another man. Having learned that his mother knew about his uncle's secret, Schmitt decides to move out because his mother still has not fully accepted his sexuality.
355	13	"Save the Last Dance for Me"	Jesse Williams	Tameson Duffy	February 13, 2020	1613	5.58
The day after they get back together, Andrew uses Meredith's name to bring Dr. Lauren Riley, a deaf diagnostician from UCSF, to consult on his patient, Suzanne, whose medical issues he still cannot figure out. With Grey Sloan absorbing PacNorth as per Catherine's request, Koracick spends the day dangling Richard and Owen's jobs in front of them, though he immediately grants Maggie her position back. Jo and Bailey treat a teen foster kid, Joey, who is worried about being separated from his foster siblings, while Schmitt and Meredith tend to an elderly former ballroom dancer whose cancer has spread throughout her body. Amelia awaits the results of her paternity test and shares a moment with Owen, though she later reveals to Link that she never ran the test in the first place. Jo worries about Alex being gone for so long without returning her phone calls, and Schmitt tells Nico he wants a more serious relationship. The hospital board gathers together to band against Koracick and reinstate everyone.
356	14	"A Diagnosis"	Greg Evans	Julie Wong	February 20, 2020	1614	5.99
Still desperate for an answer on his patient, Suzanne's, symptoms, Andrew begins showing symptoms for bipolar disorder similar to his father's mania, raising concern from Meredith and Carina. While Andrew is eventually able to diagnose Suzanne, he goes into denial when Meredith confronts him and breaks up with her. Maggie attempts to reason with Amelia, who has locked herself at home in order to avoid Link and the paternity test; when Link comes over after work, Amelia ends their relationship and announces that she will raise the baby alone with the help of her sisters. While treating a couple who got attacked by a bear in the woods, Jo learns that the wife is having an extramarital affair and worries that Alex is not returning her calls because he is cheating on her. Schmitt grows suspicious about Nico not wanting to introduce him to his parents until Schmitt learns that Nico is still not out to his parents. Bailey tries to get Richard out of his funk with a batch of new doctors from PacNorth to mentor, Hayes reunites Joey with his foster siblings, and Jackson finally gives Maggie a long overdue apology for abandoning her in the woods.
357	15	"Snowblind"	Linda Klein	Meg Marinis	February 27, 2020	1615	6.00
A blizzard that has hit Seattle sends multiple patients to Grey Sloan as temperatures continue to drop. When the roads shut down, Andrew volunteers to travel by foot through the snow in order to retrieve an organ for Hayes' patient, continuing what Meredith and Carina think is a manic spiral. Owen and Teddy fight to save a pregnant woman who has been hit by a car by her partner. While Link sulks around the hospital following his breakup with Amelia, Teddy worries that Amelia's baby might be Owen's and confirms her suspicions with Maggie, which sends Teddy into Koracick's arms. Amidst his relationship troubles with a distant Nico, Schmitt loses a patient, Tess, who he discovers is masking as a resident about to perform surgery. When Richard confronts Tess, he reveals that he has a tremor that may end his medical career. Upon learning that Joey doesn't plan on finishing school, Bailey takes him around the hospital for inspiration and later asks him to come stay with her, which he accepts. Meredith and Hayes’ chemistry deepens as they bond over their shared loses and discuss their "firsts", Jo tells Link she is almost certain that Alex has left her, and Jackson has his first fight with Vic.
358	16	"Leave a Light On"	Debbie Allen	Elisabeth R. Finch	March 5, 2020	1616	6.30
Following months of silence, Alex finally explains his absence by sending letters to Meredith, Jo, Bailey, and Richard, who each read their respective letter alone. The letters reveal that Alex hasn't been visiting his mother, but instead went to Kansas to check in with Izzie, whom he reconnected with during Meredith's trial. In Kansas, Alex learned that Izzie used the embryos they had frozen years ago and is now raising their twin son and daughter. Realizing that he loves both Izzie and Jo, Alex made a choice to be with Izzie in order to be there for his kids the way his father wasn't there for him. Alex thanks everyone for all they have done for him over the years and says he won't be returning to Seattle. After reading their letters, Jo is left with divorce papers, Richard angrily vents at an AA meeting, Bailey and Ben officially decide to let Joey stay with them, and Meredith reveals to Zola what happened to Alex.
359	17	"Life on Mars?"	Michael Watkins	Jase Miles-Perez	March 12, 2020	1617	6.27
A wealthy inventor visits Grey Sloan, seeking a diagnosis from Koracick that can excuse him for a crime he committed. After consulting on Koracick's case, Meredith treats a diabetic woman who has been rationing her insulin in order to pay for her parents' nursing home. While indulging in some dark humor over their disastrous love lives, Jo and Link work to save a young man who fell onto the train tracks while with his girlfriend. A frantic Teddy tries to avoid both Owen and Koracick after having cheated with Koracick recently, though she finds herself in an even messier situation when she discloses to Owen that he may be the father of Amelia's baby and then sleeps with Koracick again later that day. Bailey tries to comfort Richard, but he lashes out and tells her he may be stepping down from surgery. Jackson and Vic fight over the status of their relationship, leading to their breakup, and Andrew continues to show signs of mania despite his hospital-mandated therapy. Upon listening to Jo's advice, Link attempts at a grand gesture to Amelia, and after they get back together, she reveals that he is the father of her baby.
360	18	"Give a Little Bit"	Kevin McKidd	Zoanne Clack	March 19, 2020	1618	7.04
Meredith leads the hospital's first ever pro-bono surgery day but quickly finds herself overwhelmed by the influx of patients; Andrew suspects that a young girl is a victim of human trafficking, but his concerns are dismissed as bipolar mania and this leads to him having a nervous breakdown in front of the entire hospital. He nearly quits but Meredith tells him she loves him and convinces him to stay. Link turns down a job offer as the Mariners' team doctor and recommends Nico, resulting in Nico and Schmitt's breakup. Jo struggles with changing her surname from Karev and bonds with Schmitt over their breakups; they ultimately agree to be roommates. Koracick and Teddy continue to sneak around behind Owen's back.
361	19	"Love of My Life"	Allison Liddi-Brown	Kiley Donovan & Andy Reaser	March 26, 2020	1619	6.52
Richard, Maggie, Teddy, and Hayes all travel to California to attend the LA Surgical Innovation Conference as representatives for Grey Sloan. Maggie unexpectedly reunites with Winston, a man whom she worked with during his residency, and the two end up in bed together, though she declines his offer to start a real relationship with him. Having met his late wife at the hotel in which the conference in being held, Hayes reflects on the years leading up to his wife's death from cancer and lashes out at a pharmaceutical rep in the present day. Teddy is surprised when she runs into Claire, a former friend who dated Teddy's best friend, Allison, and learns that Claire knew about Teddy and Allison's affair for years but never said anything. Richard prepares for presentation on his PATH pen but is distracted by the arrival of Catherine, who seems to be seeking reconciliation. However, right before his presentation it is shown that Richard's night with Catherine had been a hallucination, and when he appears disoriented on stage, the doctors rush him to the hospital.
362	20	"Sing It Again"	Michael Watkins	Jess Righthand	April 2, 2020	1620	7.18
The doctors band together in search of a diagnosis for Richard following his erratic episode two days ago at the medical conference. After ruling out several possibilities, Maggie faces the reality that it might be Alzheimer's, but Meredith is certain that it's not. When Meredith walks in on Richard about to cut himself open, she sees how rapidly his condition is progressing and goes to Andrew for help. Amelia and Link prepare themselves for the impending birth of their son, but when she goes into false labor, they realize how anxious they are about how much their lives are about to change. Koracick's world is shaken when his ex-wife, Dana, shows up at the hospital with her son who needs to be treated for a brain tumor, forcing Koracick to relive his grief of his late son, David. With Teddy's help, Koracick is able to push past his fears and operate on the boy, though Teddy later chooses to push up her wedding with Owen. Link and Owen treat a patient who, after coming out of anesthesia, cannot stop singing, while Schmitt is unable to separate work and home life now that he and Jo are roommates.
363	21	"Put on a Happy Face"	Deborah Pratt	Mark Driscoll & Tameson Duffy	April 9, 2020	1621	7.33
As Richard's condition continues to deteriorate, the doctors are ready to call it Alzheimer's and send him home with Catherine until Andrew discovers that the cobalt metal from Richard's hip replacement has been leaking poison into his blood and causing all of his symptoms. Amelia goes into labor, and though Link is pulled into Richard's emergency surgery, she delivers a healthy baby boy with the help of Bailey. Owen and Teddy get ready for their wedding, which is scheduled for that night, but Teddy gets a tempting offer from Koracick to run away with him instead. While Schmitt, Maggie, and Owen treat a baseball player who has taken a bat to the chest, Owen learns about Koracick and Teddy's affair over voicemail and postpones the wedding without telling Teddy first. As Jackson, Jo, and Hayes operate on a teenage girl with Moebius syndrome, they discuss their dating lives, prompting Jo to tease a confused Hayes about Cristina setting him up with Meredith. Hayes later asks Meredith out for drinks, and after she asks for a rain check, she finds Andrew having another bipolar episode and takes him home.

== Cast and characters ==
=== Main ===
- Ellen Pompeo as Dr. Meredith Grey
- Justin Chambers as Dr. Alex Karev
- Chandra Wilson as Dr. Miranda Bailey
- James Pickens Jr. as Dr. Richard Webber
- Kevin McKidd as Dr. Owen Hunt
- Jesse Williams as Dr. Jackson Avery
- Caterina Scorsone as Dr. Amelia Shepherd
- Camilla Luddington as Dr. Jo Karev
- Kelly McCreary as Dr. Maggie Pierce
- Giacomo Gianniotti as Dr. Andrew DeLuca
- Kim Raver as Dr. Teddy Altman
- Greg Germann as Dr. Tom Koracick
- Jake Borelli as Dr. Levi Schmitt
- Chris Carmack as Dr. Atticus "Link" Lincoln

=== Recurring ===
- Jason George as Dr. Ben Warren
- Richard Flood as Dr. Cormac Hayes
- Debbie Allen as Dr. Catherine Fox
- Stefania Spampinato as Dr. Carina DeLuca
- Alex Blue Davis as Dr. Casey Parker
- Jaicy Elliot as Dr. Taryn Helm
- Sophia Ali as Dr. Dahlia Qadri
- Alex Landi as Dr. Nico Kim
- Jaina Lee Ortiz as Lt. Andrea "Andy" Herrera
- Cleo King as Robin
- Devika Parikh as Nancy Klein
- Barrett Doss as Victoria "Vic" Hughes
- Devin Way as Dr. Blake Simms
- Vivian Nixon as Dr. Hannah Brody
- Jasmine Guy as Gemma Larson
- Noah Alexander Gerry as Joey Phillips
- Sarah Rafferty as Suzanne
- Lindy Booth as Hadley
- Shoshannah Stern as Dr. Lauren Riley

=== Notable guests ===
- Anthony Hill as Dr. Winston Ndugu
- Holly Marie Combs as Heidi Peterson
- Alyssa Milano as Haylee Peterson
- Hal Linden as Bertram Hollister
- Lisa Ann Walter as Shirley Gregory
- Granville Ames as Eric Lincoln
- Bess Armstrong as Maureen Lincoln
- Skyler Shaye as Katie Bryce
- Robin Pearson Rose as Patricia Murphy
- Rachel Bay Jones as Carly
- Miguel Sandoval as Captain Pruitt Herrera
- Okieriete Onaodowan as Dean Miller
- Grey Damon as LT Jack Gibson
- Danielle Savre as Captain Maya Bishop
- James Saito as Hershel Roberts
- Denise Dowse as Lorraine Simms
- Isidora Goreshter as Paula
- Beanie Feldstein as Tess Anderson
- George Gerdes as Norman Sholman
- Debra Jo Rupp as Jo's Therapist
- Jonathan Cake as Griffin Ford
- Crystal McCreary as Sabrina Webber
- Zaiver Sinnett as Dr. Zander Perez
- Sherri Saum as Allison Brown
- Debra Mooney as Evelyn Hunt
- Amanda Payton as Dr. Daphne Lopez

== Production ==
=== Casting ===
On May 10, 2019, with the renewal announcement it was revealed that Chris Carmack, Greg Germann and Jake Borelli had been promoted to series-regulars. In October 2019, it was announced that Richard Flood had been cast as the new head of Pediatric Surgery at Grey Sloan, replacing Karev, who was fired in the previous season. On January 10, 2020, it was announced that Justin Chambers would be leaving the series, with his last episode being the 350th.

== Ratings ==
Viewership and ratings per episode of Grey's Anatomy season 16
No.	Title	Air date	Timeslot (ET)	Rating/share (18–49)	Viewers (millions)	DVR (18–49)	DVR viewers (millions)	Total (18–49)	Total viewers (millions)
1	"Nothing Left to Cling To"	September 26, 2019	Thursday; 8:00 p.m.	1.5/8	6.51	1.1	3.15	2.6	9.67
2	"Back in the Saddle"	October 3, 2019	Thursday; 8:00 p.m.	1.3/6	6.09	1.1	2.99	2.4	9.07
3	"Reunited"	October 10, 2019	Thursday; 8:00 p.m.	1.4/7	6.09	1.1	3.31	2.5	9.41
4	"It's Raining Men"	October 17, 2019	Thursday; 8:00 p.m.	1.2/6	5.75	1.1	3.12	2.3	8.88
5	"Breathe Again"	October 24, 2019	Thursday; 8:00 p.m.	1.3/6	6.10	1.1	2.86	2.4	8.97
6	"Whistlin' Past the Graveyard"	October 31, 2019	Thursday; 8:00 p.m.	1.1/5	5.66	1.1	3.07	2.2	8.74
7	"Papa Don't Preach"	November 7, 2019	Thursday; 8:00 p.m.	1.3/6	6.16	1.0	3.02	2.3	9.19
8	"My Shot"	November 14, 2019	Thursday; 8:00 p.m.	1.3/7	6.34	1.0	2.81	2.3	9.16
9	"Let's All Go to the Bar"	November 21, 2019	Thursday; 8:00 p.m.	1.4/7	6.40	1.0	2.95	2.4	9.37
10	"Help Me Through the Night"	January 23, 2020	Thursday; 9:00 p.m.	1.4/7	6.66	1.1	3.58	2.5	10.25
11	"A Hard Pill to Swallow"	January 30, 2020	Thursday; 9:00 p.m.	1.1/5	5.56	1.1	3.25	2.2	8.82
12	"The Last Supper"	February 6, 2020	Thursday; 9:00 p.m.	1.1/5	5.48	1.0	3.12	2.1	8.60
13	"Save the Last Dance for Me"	February 13, 2020	Thursday; 9:00 p.m.	1.0/6	5.58	1.1	3.44	2.2	9.00
14	"A Diagnosis"	February 20, 2020	Thursday; 9:00 p.m.	1.1/6	6.04	1.0	3.28	2.1	9.33
15	"Snowblind"	February 27, 2020	Thursday; 9:00 p.m.	1.1/6	6.00	1.0	3.25	2.2	9.26
16	"Leave a Light On"	March 5, 2020	Thursday; 9:00 p.m.	1.3/7	6.30	1.0	2.98	2.3	9.30
17	"Life on Mars?"	March 12, 2020	Thursday; 9:00 p.m.	1.2/6	6.27	1.1	3.33	2.3	9.62
18	"Give a Little Bit"	March 19, 2020	Thursday; 9:00 p.m.	1.5/7	7.04	1.0	3.05	2.5	10.09
19	"Love of My Life"	March 26, 2020	Thursday; 9:00 p.m.	1.3/6	6.52	1.0	3.11	2.4	9.63
20	"Sing It Again"	April 2, 2020	Thursday; 9:00 p.m.	1.4/6	7.18	1.1	3.11	2.5	10.30
21	"Put on a Happy Face"	April 9, 2020	Thursday; 9:00 p.m.	1.4/7	7.33	1.1	3.08	2.5	10.42
