= Justin Chambers =

American actor & model (born 1970)

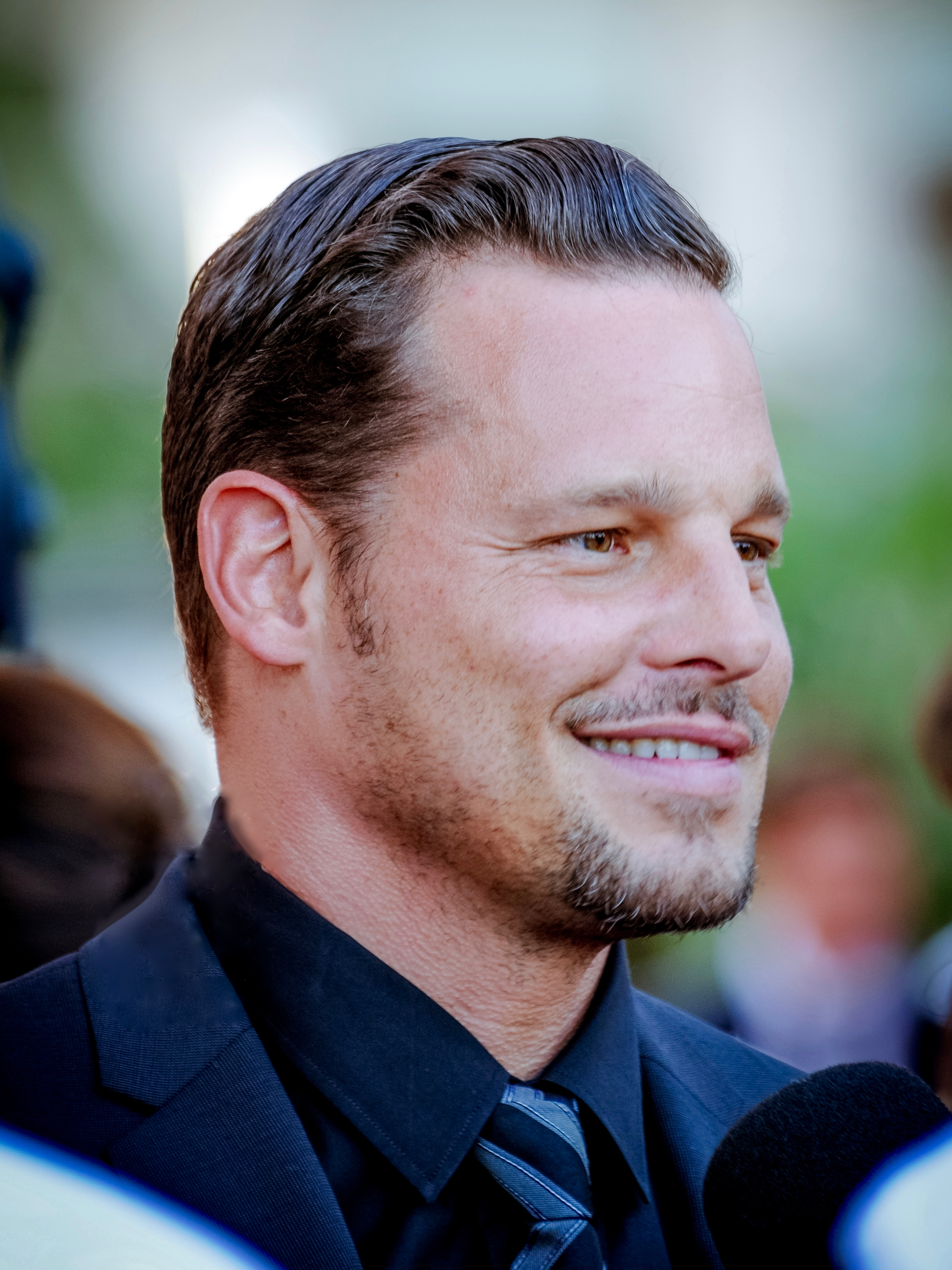
- Chambers at the Festival de Monte Carlo in 2014
- Born: Justin Willman Chambers; July 11, 1970 (age 56); Springfield, Ohio, U.S.
- Occupations: Actor; model; business owner
- Years active: 1995–present
- Spouse: Keisha Chambers (m. 1993)
- Children: 5

Justin Willman Chambers (born July 11, 1970) is an American actor and former model best known for his role as Dr. Alex Karev in Grey's Anatomy (2005–2020). Born in Ohio, he went to Southeastern High School, South Charleston, and later studied acting at New York's HB Studio. Chambers began modeling after being approached by a modeling scout in Paris. He went on to represent fashion brands including Calvin Klein, Armani, and Dolce & Gabbana. Chambers began his acting career with a recurring role in the soap opera Another World and made his feature film debut with a supporting role in the comedy drama Liberty Heights (1999).

In 2005, he was cast as Dr. Alex Karev in the ABC medical drama series Grey's Anatomy. Chambers gained widespread recognition as the series progressed and the character became one of the most popular from the hit series, earning multiple nominations and the 2017 Best TV Network Drama Actor at the People's Choice Awards as well as nominations for the Screen Actors Guild Award.

== Early life and education ==
Chambers was born Justin Willman Chambers in Springfield, Ohio, on July 11, 1970, to Pamela Sue (née Willman) and John William Eugene Chambers II, who were both deputy sheriffs. Chambers was raised in Springfield. He aspired to be a dentist. He has a fraternal twin brother, Jason; one older brother, John Jr. "Chip"; and two older sisters, Mia and Susan. The twins were frequently hospitalized as children due to persistent bouts of pneumonia. He and Jason attended Southeastern High School in South Charleston, Ohio. Justin later moved to New York, where he studied for four years at HB Studio and Ron Stetson Studios.

== Career ==
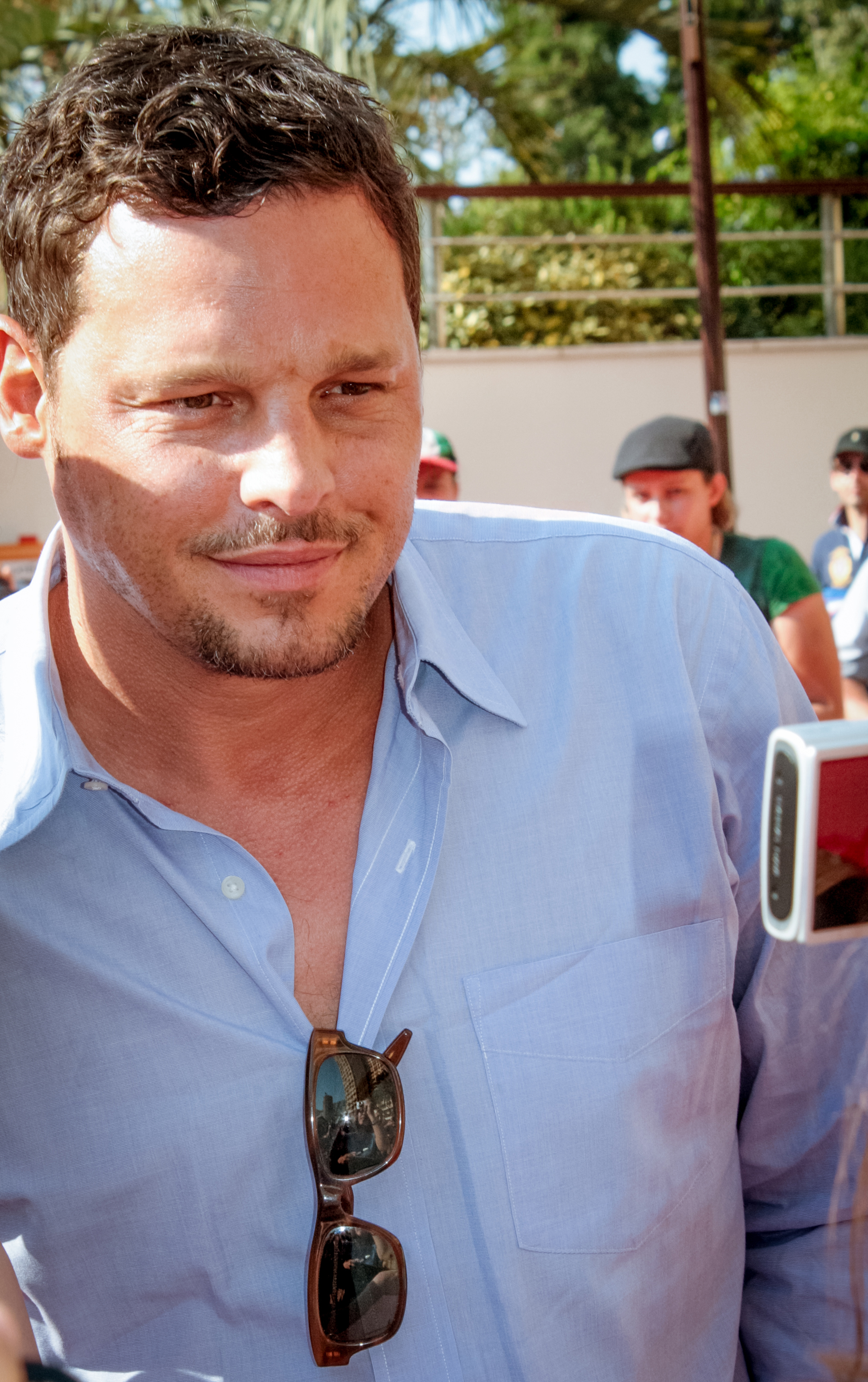
Chambers at the Monte-Carlo Television Festival in 2014

Chambers was discovered by a modelling scout on the Paris Metro and went on to star in advertising campaigns for Calvin Klein's fragrance range. He worked throughout Europe, Japan, and the United States for Calvin Klein, Armani, and Dolce & Gabbana. After deciding on an acting career, he relocated to New York City in the early 1990s, where he studied at the HB Studio.

His first major acting role was in the music video "Ants Marching" by Dave Matthews Band in 1995. He went on to land a few television roles, including a contract role as the original Nicholas Hudson in the NBC soap opera Another World, and New York Undercover. In 1998, he was cast as series regular in the short-lived CBS primetime soap opera Four Corners. Chambers has also appeared in several television films, such as Harvest of Fire, Rose Hill, and Seasons of Love.

Chambers starred in several films, notably Liberty Heights (1999, as Trey, alongside Adrien Brody), The Wedding Planner (2001, as Massimo, alongside Jennifer Lopez), The Musketeer (2001), Southern Belles (2005), The Zodiac (2005), and the HBO film Hysterical Blindness (2002). In 2003, Chambers was cast as one of the leads in the CBS crime drama Cold Case but left after appearing in only three out of the show's first four episodes.

In August 2004, Chambers was cast as surgical intern Alex Karev in Shonda Rhimes's medical drama series Grey's Anatomy, opposite Ellen Pompeo, Sandra Oh, Katherine Heigl, and T. R. Knight. In 2006, along with other cast members, he was awarded a Screen Actors Guild Award for Outstanding Performance by an Ensemble in a Drama Series. In 2009, he also guest-starred on the Grey's Anatomy spin-off, Private Practice, for the Grey's Anatomy/Private Practice crossover event. On January 10, 2020, Chambers officially announced his departure from Grey's Anatomy and that his final episode had aired on November 14, 2019, with a farewell episode airing on March 5, 2020.

In 2022, Chambers played actor Marlon Brando in the Paramount+ series The Offer, a biographical drama about the production of The Godfather.

In 2024, Chambers appeared in an episode of the anthology series Accused along with Taylor Schilling.

== Personal life ==
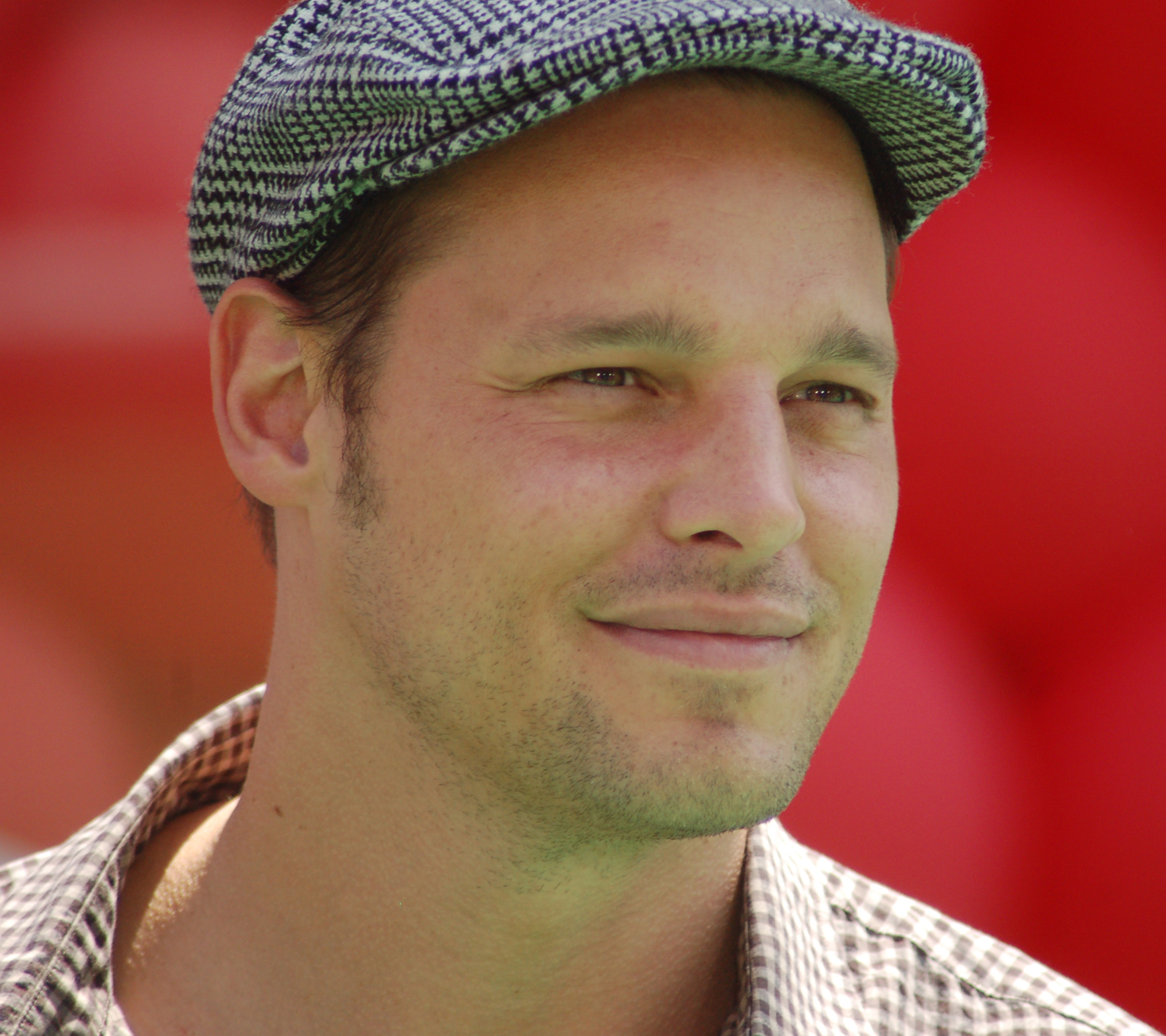
Chambers at the premiere of Up in 2009

In 1993, he married Keisha Chambers, a former model agency booker. The two met while Chambers was working for ad campaigns for Calvin Klein and Keisha was working at a modeling agency. They have five children: Isabella (b. December 1994), twins Maya and Kaila (b. June 1997), Eva (b. March 1999), and Jackson (b. January 2002). They have adopted two rescue dogs and own a beagle.

Chambers is involved with the nonprofit organization Pentecostal Christian Church mission Dream Center of Los Angeles. In late January 2008, he revealed that he suffered from a sleep disorder and had checked himself into UCLA Medical Center to treat exhaustion after a period of only two hours of sleep each week. Chambers practices hot yoga.

== Filmography ==
=== Film ===
Year	Title	Role	Notes
1999	Liberty Heights	Trey Tobelseted	
2001	The Wedding Planner	Massimo Lenzetti	
2001	The Musketeer	D'Artagnan	
2002	Leo	Ryan Eames	
2003	For Which It Stands	German Soldier	Short film
2005	Southern Belles	Rhett Butler	
2005	The Zodiac	Inspector Matt Parish	
2008	Lakeview Terrace	Donnie Eaton	
2010	The Happiest Man Alive	Sherman	Short film
2013	Broken City	Ryan Blake	
2013	Justice League: The Flashpoint Paradox	The Flash / Barry Allen (voice)	Direct-to-video

=== Television ===
Year	Title	Role	Notes
1995	Another World	Nicholas 'Nick' Hudson #1	Episode: "#1.7922"
1996	New York Undercover	Officer Nick Caso	Episode: "Unis"
1996	Harvest of Fire	George	Television film
1996	Swift Justice	Rick	Episode: "Stones"
1997	Rose Hill	Cole Clayborne	Television film
1998	Four Corners	Caleb Haskell	2 episodes
1999	Seasons of Love	Adult Hocking	Television film
2002	Hysterical Blindness	Rick	Television film
2003	Cold Case	Chris Lassing	Main role (season 1); 3 episodes
2004	The Secret Service	Charles Brody	Unsold TV pilot
2005–2020	Grey's Anatomy	Dr. Alex Karev	Main role (season 1–16); 341 episodes
2009	Private Practice	Dr. Alex Karev	Episode: "Ex-Life"
2022	The Offer	Marlon Brando	Miniseries
2024	Accused	Tyler	Episode: "April's Story"

== Awards and nominations ==
Year	Association	Category	Work	Result
2005	Teen Choice Awards	Choice TV Breakout Performance	Grey's Anatomy	Nominated
2006	Screen Actors Guild Awards	Outstanding Performance by an Ensemble in a Drama Series (Shared with cast)	Grey's Anatomy	Nominated
2006	Gold Derby Awards	Ensemble of the Year (Shared with cast)	Grey's Anatomy	Nominated
2006	Satellite Awards	Best Ensemble in Television (Shared with cast)	Grey's Anatomy	Won
2007	Gold Derby Awards	Ensemble of the Year (Shared with cast)	Grey's Anatomy	Nominated
2007	Screen Actors Guild Awards	Outstanding Performance by an Ensemble in a Drama Series (Shared with cast)	Grey's Anatomy	Won
2007	Golden Nymph Award	Outstanding Actor - Drama Series	Grey's Anatomy	Nominated
2008	Screen Actors Guild Awards	Outstanding Performance by an Ensemble in a Drama Series (Shared with cast)	Grey's Anatomy	Nominated
2008	Prism Awards	Performance in a Drama Series Episode	Grey's Anatomy	Nominated
2009	Prism Awards	Performance in a Drama Multi-Episode Storyline	Grey's Anatomy	Nominated
2014	Prism Awards	Male Performance in a Drama Series Multi-Episode Storyline	Grey's Anatomy	Won
2015	People's Choice Awards	Favorite Dramatic TV Actor	Grey's Anatomy	Nominated
2016	People's Choice Awards	Favorite Dramatic TV Actor	Grey's Anatomy	Nominated
2017	People's Choice Awards	Favorite Dramatic TV Actor	Grey's Anatomy	Won
2018	People's Choice Awards	The Male TV Star of 2018	Grey's Anatomy	Nominated
