= List of Grey's Anatomy characters =

Fictional characters in the televised medical drama

Grey's Anatomy is an American television medical drama series created by Shonda Rhimes and broadcast by ABC. The show features an ensemble cast of lead characters, along with multiple supporting cast members. During its first season, the show featured nine lead characters. Throughout subsequent seasons, many characters have been written out, either due to actors electing to depart the show or due to screenwriters altering character arcs. The following is a list of characters by role type who have appeared over the various seasons since the drama's premiere.

== Main characters ==
=== Chiefs of Surgery ===
Name	Actor	Starring seasons	Recurring/guest seasons	Occupation at Grey Sloan (Or Its Predecessors)	Job Title
Theodora "Teddy" Altman	Kim Raver	6, 7, 8, 15, 16, 17, 18, 19, 20, 21, 22	6, 14	Chief of Surgery, Attending Cardiothoracic Surgeon, Former Co-Chief of Cardiothoracic Surgery, Former Chief of Trauma Surgery	M.D., FACS
Teddy Altman takes over Chief of Cardiothoracic Surgery at Seattle Grace Mercy West Hospital in Season 6. She previously served in Iraq with Owen Hunt. Although a skilled surgeon, her teaching methods might appear somewhat unorthodox. Her arrival at Seattle Grace, followed by her confession of love to Owen, causes some friction between Owen and his girlfriend, Cristina Yang. In Season 8, Teddy marries Henry, a patient at the hospital, to get insurance, and they eventually fall in love. Their romance tragically ends when Henry dies while Cristina performs surgery on him. Over time, a friendship develops between Teddy and Cristina, but Teddy's friendship with Owen ends when she feels he puts the hospital before her. When Owen finds out Teddy was offered a job at the U.S. Army Medical Command (MEDCOM) but turned it down because she wanted to be there for Owen, Owen fires her so she will go to MEDCOM. Teddy returns in Season 14 to be there for Owen after his sister, Megan, is found. Towards the end of Season 14, it is revealed that Teddy is pregnant after sleeping with Owen. In Season 15, she moves back to Seattle, tells Owen that she's pregnant with his baby, and agrees to raise the baby with him as friends. She then starts a relationship with Tom Koracick after flirting with him in the lounge. After Season 15, she realizes she is in love with Owen just as she gives birth to their daughter, Allison. In Season 16, she returns to work as Chief of Trauma following Owen's job switch to PacNorth while balancing her new responsibilities of motherhood. She also gets engaged to Owen, though she starts sleeping with Koracick again, which Owen discovers on their wedding day. In Season 17, Owen calls off their wedding, and Teddy is left to deal with the unanimous animosity she receives from everyone at the hospital. After she loses several patients, including colleague Andrew DeLuca, Teddy collapses into a catatonic state and is only lifted out of it with the help of Owen. Teddy and Owen slowly reconcile, and in the season finale, they get engaged again. At the beginning of Season 18, she and Owen got married at the Emerald City Bar after their wedding at the park was interrupted by a bicycle accident. In season 19 Teddy becomes the Chief of Surgery following the departure of Meredith Grey from Seattle and Grey Sloan.
Miranda Bailey	Chandra Wilson	1, 2, 3, 4, 5, 6, 7, 8, 9, 10, 11, 12, 13, 14, 15, 16, 17, 18, 19, 20, 21, 22	—N/a	Attending General Surgeon, Director of the Residency Program, Member of the Board, Former Chief of Surgery, Former Chief Resident, Former General Surgical Resident	M.D., FACS
A general surgery resident at Seattle Grace Hospital, Miranda Bailey initially gives a cold, oppressive impression, earning her the nickname "The Nazi." Her attitude softens, and she develops a maternal demeanor towards the residents in the hospital. She goes through a divorce in Season 5 and turns down a fellowship in pediatric surgery because she would be a single mother and would not raise her child with extended hours as a pediatric fellow. She was previously married to Tucker Jones, who is the father of her child that she has in Season 2, William George Bailey Jones. The name George comes from Dr. George O'Malley, however she refers to her son as "Tuck", after the father. After having a short-lived relationship with a nurse, Eli, she dates anesthesiologist Ben Warren, whom she eventually marries. In Season 10, Bailey discovers that she has OCD and is forced to work with an occupational therapist to control her disorder. Ultimately, Bailey decides to start taking a medication that will help control it. In Season 12, Bailey is named Chief of Surgery, making her the first female chief in the hospital's history. In Season 14, she suffers a heart attack due to all the stress in her life, notably the hospital hacking and Ben making a career change for the third time. In Season 15, Bailey takes a sabbatical from her position as Chief of Surgery and asks Ben to take a break from their marriage, though they eventually reconcile. In Season 16, after experiencing menopausal symptoms, she learns that she is pregnant, but she later loses the baby to a miscarriage. After taking some time to grieve, she bonds with Joey, a teenage foster kid and patient at Grey Sloan, and asks him to stay with her. In Season 17, while working the frontlines of COVID-19, Bailey loses her mother to the Coronavirus and Alzheimer's. Bailey quits Grey Sloan in the Season 18 finale and returns to work as an Attending in Season 19.
Meredith Grey	Ellen Pompeo	1, 2, 3, 4, 5, 6, 7, 8, 9, 10, 11, 12, 13, 14, 15, 16, 17, 18, 19, 20, 21, 22 (Note: Ellen Pompeo makes her last regular appearance in 19x07. She continues to narrate most episodes and appears sporadically in the following episodes and subsequent seasons. Pompeo continues to receive top billing in any episodes in which she appears and/or provides narration for.)	—N/a	Attending General Surgeon, Director of the Board, Grey Sloan Memorial Hospital Shareholder, Former Chief of Surgery, Former Chief of General Surgery, Former Director of the Residency Program, Former General Surgical Resident, Former General Surgical Intern	M.D., FACS
Meredith Grey is the show's protagonist and narrator of most episodes. She begins the series as an intern and has since progressed along her medical career path. She went to the Geisel School of Medicine at Dartmouth College after sleeping around Europe with her former best friend, Sadie. She is best friends with Cristina Yang. Following a long romance, she marries neurosurgeon Derek Shepherd. On the day of the shooting in Season 6, she discovers that she is pregnant, but she miscarries the baby due to stress that same day. She later learns that she has a "hostile uterus" and starts taking fertility shots. When they are unsuccessful, Meredith and Derek adopt Zola, a surgical African orphan. In Season 9, following the plane crash that killed her younger sister, Lexie Grey, Meredith becomes an attending general surgeon. She has earned the nickname "Medusa" from her interns and residents. Bailey is born in the Season 9 finale; she gives birth to him by C-section and has major abdominal surgery following a fall. In the Season 10 finale, she says goodbye to Cristina as Cristina leaves for Zurich to take Burke's hospital; before they say goodbye, Cristina reminds Meredith that she should not let Derek's career hinder her own. In Season 11, Meredith struggles with keeping her marriage afloat after Derek decides to work for the president in DC and learns that she has another half-sister, Maggie Pierce. After Derek is killed at the end of Season 11, Meredith escapes to California for a year, where she gives birth to their daughter, whom she names Ellis after her late mother. In Season 12, Meredith returns to Seattle and is named Chief of General Surgery by the newly appointed Chief of Surgery, Miranda Bailey. Meredith tries moving on by dating William Thorpe, a surgeon from another hospital but has trouble forgetting about Derek. She can finally take the next step with Nathan Riggs, and the two begin a relationship after months of Nathan pursuing Meredith. Still, the romance comes to an end after Nathan's missing fiancée, Megan, is found. Meredith wins a Catherine Fox Award in Season 14 after performing a ground-breaking abdominal wall transplant on Megan. In Season 15, she begins a relationship with Andrew DeLuca after sharing a kiss at Alex and Jo's wedding. She is fired from the hospital after Season 15 for committing insurance fraud. In Season 16, she is forced to do community service while her medical license status hangs in the air; after a hearing, she can keep her license and is rehired by Grey Sloan. On her first day back, she meets Cormac Hayes, the new Chief of Pediatrics, whom she grows closer to as they bond over their shared loss of a spouse. During this time, she and Andrew also break up after Meredith confronts him over his developing signs of mania. In Season 17, Meredith tests positive for COVID-19, and while she battles for her life, she falls in and out of consciousness as she dreams of Derek, George, Andrew, Lexie, and Mark. She eventually recovers and begins operating again, as well as assumes the position as Director of the Residency Program. In the Season 18 finale, Meredith becomes Interim Chief of Surgery when Miranda Bailey quits Grey Sloan. She leaves Seattle in Season 19 to move to Boston to work for the Catherine Fox Foundation and find a cure for Alzheimer's disease.
Owen Hunt	Kevin McKidd	5, 6, 7, 8, 9, 10, 11, 12, 13, 14, 15, 16, 17, 18, 19, 20, 21, 22	5	Chief of Trauma Surgery, Attending Trauma Surgeon, Former Chief of Surgery	M.D., FACS
Entering the series as a tough veteran in Season 5, Owen Hunt immediately begins a relationship with Cristina Yang. He has post-traumatic stress disorder and struggles with the horrors he experienced while serving in the army in Iraq. He invites a former colleague, Teddy Altman, to work alongside him, a decision that causes some friction between him and Cristina. In the Season 7 premiere, he marries Cristina. After Richard Webber resigns, he is given the position of Chief of Surgery. He and Cristina experience marital problems after his affair with a woman at a bar is revealed; they also continue to disagree over the fact that Cristina does not want kids. They try to resolve their issues, but they eventually divorce. Still, after the divorce, they continue to see each other until the end of Season 9, when she decides to let him go. In Season 10, he starts a relationship with Emma Marling, an attending at Seattle Presbyterian, but they break up due to their different life values. He starts to sleep with Cristina again until she moves to Zurich, ending their relationship for good. At the end of Season 11, Owen begins a relationship with Amelia Shepherd, and they marry in the Season 12 finale. However, even at the start of their marriage, they begin to have problems, partially because they get married so impulsively. They start living apart. By Season 14, they decide to get a divorce when Amelia discovers she has a brain tumor that has been impeding her judgment for the last ten years, including her decision to marry Owen. After that, Owen has flings with Carina DeLuca and Teddy, both of which fail. In Season 15, he and Amelia get back together after fostering a baby boy named Leo and Leo's teenage birth mother, Betty. They eventually break up again after Teddy reveals that she is pregnant with Owen's baby. At the end of the season, Owen realizes he is in love with Teddy and tells her just as she gives birth to their daughter, Allison. In Season 16, due to his feud with Tom Koracick, Owen resigns from Grey Sloan and takes a job as Head of Trauma at PacNorth. After the Catherine Fox Foundation absorbs PacNorth, Owen is rehired at Grey Sloan. He also proposes to Teddy, which she accepts. On the day of the wedding, Teddy accidentally sends Owen a voicemail in which she's having sex with Tom, prompting Owen to break off their engagement. In Season 17, Owen continues to act cold toward Teddy until he learns more about her relationship with Allison. He and Teddy slowly reconcile, and in the season finale, he re-proposes to her. At the beginning of Season 18, he and Teddy got married at the Emerald City Bar after their wedding at the park was interrupted by a bicycle accident.
Derek Shepherd	Patrick Dempsey	1, 2, 3, 4, 5, 6, 7, 8, 9, 10, 11	17	Chief of Neurosurgery, Attending Neurosurgeon, Director of the Board, Former Chief of Surgery	M.D., FACS
As Chief of Neurosurgery, Derek Shepherd earns the nickname "McDreamy" from the female staff of Seattle Grace. He graduated from Columbia University School of Physicians and Surgeons. As the lead male character, he is known for his complicated love life. He initially moves to Seattle from New York City to get away from his ex-wife, Addison Montgomery, who he discovers is having an affair with his best friend, Mark Sloan. He subsequently begins a long romance with Meredith Grey, which is on and off until their marriage in Season 5. He takes over as the Chief of Surgery after going to the hospital board about Webber's drinking problem. He resigns after nearly dying from being shot because he thinks being chief isn't his place, after which Webber is reinstated. He and Meredith adopt an orphan named Zola from Africa at the beginning of Season 8, despite having problems with the adoption process. After surviving the plane crash in the Season 8 finale, his sister donates a nerve to repair his injured hand. Although he and Meredith struggle with fertility problems, Meredith gives birth to their son, Bailey, in the Season 9 finale. In Season 10, Derek starts to work with the president on a brain mapping project, using technology that he and Callie created. He wants to move to DC with his family, but Meredith doesn't want to leave Seattle. This creates tension in their marriage, and Derek's decision to leave for DC without Meredith only worsens things. Eventually, Derek decides to take a step back from his brain mapping project and reconciles with Meredith. Not long after, he dies of a head injury after a semi-truck t-bones his car at the end of Season 11. Meredith then gave birth to their third child, a daughter named Ellis, who was likely conceived the day before he died. In Season 17, Derek returns to appear in Meredith's fever dream as she battles COVID-19.
Richard Webber	James Pickens, Jr.	1, 2, 3, 4, 5, 6, 7, 8, 9, 10, 11, 12, 13, 14, 15, 16, 17, 18, 19, 20, 21, 22	—N/a	Chief Medical Officer, Senior Attending General Surgeon, Member of the Board, Grey Sloan Memorial Hospital Shareholder, Former Chief of Surgery, Former Director of the Residency Program	M.D., FACS
An authority figure and longtime Chief of Surgery at Seattle Grace, Richard Webber has had a problematic past, characterized by affairs and alcoholism. His relationship with Meredith Grey is volatile because he had an affair with her mother, Ellis Grey. Richard has struggled with managing the finances of Seattle Grace Hospital and had eventually merged the hospital with Mercy West Hospital. The merger has caused him a lot of stress, strained his relationship with Derek Shepherd, and ultimately contributed to the collapse of his sobriety. He steps down as Chief of Surgery in Season 8 after taking the blame for tampering with Derek's clinical trial (which Meredith had done to help Richard's wife, Adele); because he has been chief for so long, the residents still call him "Chief." Outside of the hospital, Richard deals with marital problems with his wife, Adele, who later gets Alzheimer's and eventually dies. When Adele no longer recognizes him, Richard starts a relationship with Catherine Avery, whom he marries at the end of Season 11. Though they have their issues, they eventually reconcile and are stronger than ever. At the end of Season 10, Richard meets Maggie Pierce, who reveals herself to be his secret daughter with Ellis Grey. He is fired after Season 15 after trying to defend Meredith Grey from committing insurance fraud. In Season 16, after struggling to find a new job, he takes up Alex's offer to work with him on rebuilding the PacNorth hospital. This puts a strain on his relationship with Catherine, and they eventually decide to separate, with Catherine shutting down PacNorth in spite. Richard can return to work at Grey Sloan but is noticeably solemn; when a tremor and memory loss threaten his surgical career, he steps down from surgery and soon suffers a public episode. The doctors are eventually able to diagnose Richard with cobalt poisoning from a past hip replacement procedure. In Season 17, Richard is named Chief Medical Officer (Chief of Chiefs) and Meredith's Power-of-Attorney due to her COVID-19 diagnosis.

=== Department Chiefs ===
Name	Actor	Starring seasons	Recurring/guest seasons	Occupation at Grey Sloan (Or Its Predecessors)	Job Title
Jackson Avery	Jesse Williams	7, 8, 9, 10, 11, 12, 13, 14, 15, 16, 17	6, 18, 19, 21, 22	Chief of Plastic Surgery, Attending Plastic Surgeon, Attending E.N.T. Surgeon, Chairman of the Board, Trustee to the Catherine Fox Foundation, Former General Surgical Resident	M.D., FACS
First introduced as a surgical resident from Mercy West Hospital after the merger, Jackson Avery is the grandson of the famous surgeon, Harper Avery, and son of the renowned surgeon, Catherine Fox (formerly Avery). A member of the "plastics posse," training under Mark Sloan (and succeeding him as Chief of Plastics following his death), he is also called "pretty boy," especially by Cristina Yang. He develops a crush on Cristina and, while drunk at a party, he kisses her, but Cristina breaks the kiss. He also has a complicated relationship with Lexie Grey, which becomes a recurring plot point. Though he is offered a position as a surgical fellow at Tulane Medical Center, Jackson decides to stay in Seattle following Mark's death. At the end of Season 8, he starts sleeping with his best friend April Kepner, who had previously planned to remain a virgin until marriage. After Jackson and April break up, Jackson starts a relationship with the new intern, Stephanie Edwards, after hooking up with her in a car during Bailey's wedding. Meanwhile, April goes on to date a paramedic named Matthew Taylor. At April's wedding to Matthew, Jackson realizes he still loves April and stands up, professing his love; they soon after elope. It is then revealed that he and April are expecting a baby, but they learn early that their unborn son has a fatal condition. April gives birth to their stillborn son, whom they named Samuel. Jackson and April experience marital problems, leading to their separation. However, after sleeping together one night, April gets pregnant and eventually gives birth to their healthy daughter, Harriet. Now divorced from April, Jackson was in a relationship with Maggie Pierce from Season 14 until the beginning of Season 16 and dated firefighter Vic Hughes of Station 19 until mid-Season 16. In Season 17, Jackson and a recently divorced Jo start a "sex-only" relationship, though after Jackson visits his birth father again, he decides to leave the hospital and take over the Harper Avery Foundation in order to help more minorities. He and April decide to move to Boston with Harriet and depart Seattle by the end of the season.
Preston Burke	Isaiah Washington	1, 2, 3	10	Chief of Cardiothoracic Surgery, Attending Cardiothoracic Surgeon, Former Interim Chief of Surgery	M.D., FACS
Preston Burke is the former Chief of Cardiothoracic Surgery and was once expected to become Chief of Surgery. He begins a romantic relationship with Cristina Yang in Season 1, which comes under strain when Burke is shot, and his right hand's nerve supply is disrupted. With his career threatened, he has Cristina perform some of his surgeries, which is resolved when Derek Shepherd repairs his hand. Burke and Cristina continue their relationship, which ultimately ends on their wedding day when he leaves her at the altar and leaves the hospital. Burke graduated at the top of his class from the Johns Hopkins School of Medicine. In Season 4, he receives the Harper Avery Award. Burke returns in Season 10, offering Cristina his hospital in Zurich, which she accepts.
Erica Hahn	Brooke Smith	4, 5	2, 3	Chief of Cardiothoracic Surgery, Attending Cardiothoracic Surgeon	M.D., FACS
Following Preston Burke's departure, Erica Hahn takes his position as Chief of Cardiothoracic Surgery at Seattle Grace. Her brusque, somewhat harsh personality is tempered by Callie Torres, with whom she begins a relationship. However, her time at Seattle Grace ends abruptly when she becomes discontent with Izzie Stevens and the lack of disciplinary action following the Denny Duquette incident. Hahn attended the Johns Hopkins School of Medicine, where she was in the same class as Preston Burke and graduated second right after him.
Cormac Hayes	Richard Flood	17, 18	16	Chief of Pediatric Surgery, Attending Pediatric Surgeon	M.D., FACS
Cormac Hayes is introduced in the mid-season finale of Season 16 as the new Head of Pediatric Surgery to replace Alex Karev, who had been fired after the previous season and had since taken a job at another hospital. Hayes immediately clashes with Meredith Grey over a patient, though later revealed that he was sent to the hospital for Meredith by Cristina Yang. Like Meredith, he lost his spouse and is now raising children as a single father. Eventually, he and Meredith grow closer as he acknowledges how good it feels to have a friend to talk to about losing a spouse. He departs the series in its 18th season when he decides to return to Ireland with his children.
Alex Karev	Justin Chambers	1, 2, 3, 4, 5, 6, 7, 8, 9, 10, 11, 12, 13, 14, 15, 16	—N/a	Chief of Pediatric Surgery, Attending Pediatric Surgeon, Grey Sloan Memorial Hospital Shareholder, Former Interim Chief of Surgery, Former General Surgical Resident, Former General Surgical Intern	M.D., FACS
A hard-headed and often discourteous resident, Alex Karev has had a series of unfortunate relationships throughout his life, beginning with his mother. At an early age, he had to defend her and his siblings from an abusive father, then later take care of her when she struggled with schizophrenia. While working as a doctor, he becomes involved with a patient, Ava. However, her mental instability strains their relationship and Alex, once again, adopts the caretaker's role before Ava's admission to a psychiatric hospital. He subsequently embarks on a relationship with Izzie Stevens, and they get married, but Izzie asks for divorce following her dismissal from Seattle Grace. In the Season 8 finale, he is meant to fly with other surgeons to perform a procedure at Boise Memorial. However, after he states his intention to do his pediatric surgical fellowship at the Johns Hopkins Hospital to Arizona Robbins, she replaces him out of anger. In the Season 9 premiere, he is supposed to leave Seattle Grace, having deferred his fellowship in the aftermath of the plane crash. After he realizes the drastic changes that will happen in both his and Arizona's absence, due to the hiring of a new Chief of Pediatric Surgery, he changes his mind and stays on at Seattle Grace. In the Season 9 finale, he starts a relationship with a surgical intern Jo Wilson. In Season 10, he completes his fellowship and goes to work for Dr. Lebackes at a private practice, which saw him make a substantial salary. However, after being fired when Lebackes found out he was up for a position on the Grey Sloan board, he returned to Grey Sloan as an attending Pediatric Surgeon. He and Jo start to have problems in their relationship, which only worsen when she turns down his marriage proposal. In the Season 12 finale, he finds a drunk Jo with Andrew DeLuca, and he assumes that Andrew is taking advantage of Jo, leading to Alex beating him up. This results in Alex getting charged with a felony, but Andrew eventually drops the charges. Jo has trouble trusting Alex and is afraid of his inability to mask his rage. Still, they get back together in the Season 14 premiere when he proves that he would never be violent with her by not attacking her husband when Alex first sees him at a conference in Los Angeles; soon after, they become engaged. In the Season 14 finale, Alex and Jo get married. In the Season 15 premiere, Alex is named interim Chief of Surgery. After the season, he is fired by Bailey after trying to defend Meredith for committing insurance fraud. In Season 16, he takes on rebuilding PacNorth, one of the lowest-rated hospitals in Seattle, as the new Chief of Surgery, until the Catherine Fox Foundation shuts it down. After reconnecting with Izzie due to Meredith's trial, Alex learns that Izzie had their twin son and daughter via their frozen embryos and is now raising them in Kansas. Alex departs Seattle to be with his kids, ending his relationship with Jo and beginning his life with Izzie.
Atticus "Link" Lincoln	Chris Carmack	16, 17, 18, 19, 20, 21, 22	15	Chief of Orthopedic Surgery, Attending Orthopedic Surgeon	M.D., FAAOS
Atticus "Link" Lincoln is introduced in Season 15 as the new Chief of Orthopedic Surgery. His cancer history as a child pushed him to become a surgeon, though he briefly left medicine when he prescribed opioids to a patient who subsequently died from an addiction to them. He knew Jo Karev when they were younger and reconciles their friendship when he begins working at Grey-Sloan. After pursuing Meredith Grey as a love interest, he eventually starts dating Amelia Shepherd towards the end of the season following her break up with Owen Hunt. In Season 16, he learns that Amelia is pregnant, and they decide to raise the baby together. In the season finale, Amelia gives birth to a healthy baby boy named Scout Derek Shepherd-Lincoln. In Season 17, Link and Amelia help take care of Meredith's kids while Meredith fights for her life in the hospital. Towards the end of the season, Link expresses his desire to have more children, and in the season finale, he proposes to Amelia, who turns him down.
Addison Montgomery	Kate Walsh	2, 3	1, 2, 4, 5, 6, 7, 8, 18, 19, 22	Chief of Neonatal Surgery, Attending Neonatal Surgeon, Attending Obstetrician and Gynaecologist, Attending Fetal Surgeon, Attending Medical Geneticist	M.D., FACS, FACOG
Attending Neonatal Surgeon and the ex-wife of Derek Shepherd, Addison Montgomery, transfers to Seattle Grace seeking reconciliation with Derek. After achieving a degree of understanding with Derek and realizing that he is in love with Meredith Grey, Addison leaves Seattle Grace. The character goes on to be the protagonist of Grey's Anatomy spinoff, Private Practice for six seasons and sporadically makes guest appearances on Grey's until her latest one in Season 8. She returns for a recurring arc in the eighteenth season to work on a clinical trial and appears for another recurring arc in the nineteenth season, where she returns to Grey Sloan to handle things involving sex and OB/GYN. Addison reappears in Season 22, where she seeks assistance with a patient with a neurological condition
Winston Ndugu	Anthony Hill	17, 18, 19, 20, 21, 22	16	Chief of Cardiothoracic Surgery, Attending Cardiothoracic Surgeon	M.D.
Winston Ndugu is introduced in Season 17 as an Attending Cardiothoracic Surgeon from Tufts Medical Center in Boston. While attending the Surgical Innovation Conference in Los Angeles, he runs into Maggie Pierce, his former teacher. It is revealed that Winston had developed a major crush on Maggie during residency but was not able to act on it because she moved to Seattle. During the conference, Winston and Maggie hook up and reminisce over their time together during his residency. In Season 18, Winston and Maggie continue a long-distance relationship until Winston moves to Seattle. They become engaged midway through the season and marry in the season finale. In Season 19, they separate when Maggie moves to Chicago and Winston becomes the Chief of Cardiothoracic Surgery.
Margaret "Maggie" Pierce	Kelly McCreary	11, 12, 13, 14, 15, 16, 17, 18, 19	10, 20, 22	Chief/Co-Chief of Cardiothoracic Surgery, Attending Cardiothoracic Surgeon	M.D., FACS
Maggie Pierce enters at the end of Season 10 as the new Chief of Cardiothoracic Surgery. She shares with Richard Webber, her birth father, that her biological mother is Ellis Grey. At the beginning of Season 11, Maggie informs Meredith that they are sisters; although Meredith is hostile towards Maggie about the situation, she eventually welcomes her into the family. After Derek dies, Maggie moves in with Meredith, along with Meredith's sister-in-law, Amelia Shepherd. Maggie begins a relationship with Andrew DeLuca, an intern at Grey Sloan, but that ends in the middle of Season 12; she then moves her interest to Nathan Riggs, but he is unavailable due to his budding romance with Meredith. In Season 13, Maggie suffers through the loss of her mother to breast cancer. In Season 14, Maggie begins to date Jackson Avery, but they break up in the Season 16 premiere. Following the death of a close patient, Maggie struggles emotionally and resigns from Grey Sloan. After speaking with Richard, she returns to work, though she is now the co-Chief of Cardio with Teddy Altman. In season 17, Maggie begins a relationship with Winston Ndugu, a doctor previously worked with and reconnected with while in L.A. The two get engaged halfway through the season and marry in the season finale. Maggie leaves Grey Sloan and Seattle towards the end of Season 19 for Chicago.
Arizona Robbins	Jessica Capshaw	6, 7, 8, 9, 10, 11, 12, 13, 14	5, 20	Chief of Fetal Surgery, Attending Pediatric Surgeon, Attending Fetal Surgeon, Director of the Board, Former Chief of Pediatric Surgery	M.D., FACS
Arizona Robbins, pediatric surgery attending, has a cheery disposition but gets upset when challenging authority. Upon her introduction in Season 5, Arizona immediately embarks upon a relationship with Callie Torres. She came from a military family and graduated from the Johns Hopkins School of Medicine. Arizona harbors great emotional intelligence. Her insight and advice have been used to defuse several situations, such as Callie's dispute with her father. In Season 7, Arizona wins a prestigious award, and she and Callie plan to move to Malawi and work there. However, she breaks up with Callie and leaves her at the airport. They reconcile soon after and ultimately get married right after their daughter, Sofia is born. In the Season 9 premiere, she loses one of her legs due to injuries sustained during a plane crash at the end of Season 8, which strains the marriage, culminating in her cheating on Callie. They briefly separate but decide to work things out. However, after going through a 30-day hiatus during couples therapy, Callie decides to end things between them. At the end of Season 12, Arizona gets full custody of Sofia following a messy custody battle. Still, she decides to allow Sofia to go back and forth between her parents when Callie moves to New York. In Season 13, Arizona begins a relationship with Eliza Minnick, an intrusive doctor whom everyone dislikes, and is forced to hide their relationship. However, by the beginning of Season 14, Eliza has left Seattle, and Arizona starts seeing visiting doctor Carina DeLuca. When Sofia starts having disciplinary problems in school, Arizona decides she should move herself and Sofia to New York City to be with Callie; thus, Arizona and Carina break up. During the Season 14 finale, Arizona and Sofia leave for New York, with the possibility of Arizona reconciling her relationship with Callie.
Amelia Shepherd	Caterina Scorsone	11, 12, 13, 14, 15, 16, 17, 18, 19, 20, 21, 22	7, 8, 10	Chief of Neurosurgery, Attending Neurosurgeon	M.D., FACS
Amelia Shepherd is Derek Shepherd's youngest sister. Like her brother, she is also a neurosurgeon. Amelia and Derek immediately don't have the best relationship due to Amelia's history with substance abuse and the inevitable competition within their career field. Still, they eventually learn to work together, even when Amelia takes Derek's long-held position as Chief of Neurosurgery. After Derek's death in Season 11, Amelia moves in with her sister-in-law, Meredith Grey, although they initially have some unresolved issues about Derek to work out. Amelia marries Owen Hunt in the Season 12 finale, but their marriage is rocky and ultimately culminates in a divorce at the beginning of Season 14. Amelia discovers that she has a tumor affecting her judgment for the last ten years; she gets it removed by her former Johns Hopkins University professor, Tom Koracick, with whom she starts sleeping. Towards the end of the season, Amelia takes in a homeless teenage girl, Betty, who has just given up her baby, whom Owen fosters. At the beginning of Season 15, Amelia gets back together with Owen, but they break up again once Betty returns home with her parents. Amelia then starts dating Link, the new Chief of Orthopedic Surgery, and in Season 16, they learn Amelia is pregnant; she gives birth to their son, Scout, in the season finale. In Season 17, Amelia struggles with thoughts of relapsing as she realizes she and Link are on different pages in terms of marriage and more children. In the season finale, Link proposes to Amelia, but she turns him down.
Mark Sloan	Eric Dane	3, 4, 5, 6, 7, 8, 9 (Note: Although he only appeared in the first two episodes of the ninth season, Eric Dane was still billed as a member of the main cast in those two episodes.)	2, 3, 17	Chief of Plastic Surgery, Attending Plastic Surgeon, Attending E.N.T Surgeon, Former Interim Chief of Surgery	M.D., FACS
Mark Sloan, Chief of Plastic Surgery, attended Columbia University College of Physicians and Surgeons. He has a playboy personality that jeopardizes his friendship with Derek Shepherd when he has an affair with Derek's wife, Addison Montgomery. He had known both Derek and Addison from the time when all three lived in New York City. Derek and Mark manage to resolve their issues and reaffirm their friendship. Meredith and her friends have given him the nickname "McSteamy." Sloan has a relationship with Lexie Grey, which ends due to the strain of Mark's 18-year-old daughter from a one-night stand appearing at the hospital and subsequently moving in with them. Mark's daughter comes to him, pregnant, and though he wants her to keep the baby, she doesn't. Afterward, she leaves Seattle. Mark and Lexie resume their relationship, but it ends when Mark gets Callie Torres pregnant, and Lexie starts dating Jackson Avery. When Lexie is dying after the plane crash, Mark admits that he loves her and always will; he holds her hand until she dies. In the Season 9 premiere, Mark dies from injuries sustained in a plane crash. The hospital is renamed in his and Lexie's memory. In Season 17, Mark appears in Meredith's COVID-19 fever dream.
Calliope "Callie" Torres	Sara Ramirez	3, 4, 5, 6, 7, 8, 9, 10, 11, 12	2	Chief of Orthopedic Surgery, Attending Orthopedic Surgeon, Director of the Board, Former Chief Resident, Former Orthopedic Surgery Resident	M.D.
Callie Torres, an orthopedic surgeon, is introduced as an orthopedic surgical resident. She was once married to George O'Malley but divorced him after he had an affair with Izzie Stevens. Later, she has a fling with Erica Hahn, but that is cut short by Hahn's departure from Seattle Grace. Callie then enters a happy relationship with Arizona Robbins, but they break up because Arizona does not want to have kids. At the end of Season 6, after performing surgery on a small girl while a shooter is loose in the hospital, Callie tells Arizona in a roundabout way that she loves her. The two get back together and decide that they are going to have children. In Season 7, Callie moves to Africa with Arizona, but Arizona breaks up with her and leaves her at the airport in Seattle. Callie sleeps with Mark again and becomes pregnant. Arizona later returns for Callie, and they get back together. Later, Callie is severely injured in a car crash with Arizona. Addison delivers her baby, Sofia Robbin Sloan Torres, at 23 weeks, and the baby survives; soon after, she and Arizona marry. In the Season 9 premiere, Callie and Arizona's relationship is strained, with Mark dying and Arizona having one leg amputated, as decided by Callie to save Arizona's life. Still resenting Callie's medical decision, Arizona cheats on her, leading Callie to kick her out of the apartment. After the Travis Reed lawsuit and a conversation with her father, Callie asks Arizona to move back in, and they begin working on repairing their marriage. Callie cuts their couples therapy short when she realizes that she needs to love herself, not Arizona. In the Season 12 finale, she resigns from Grey Sloan and moves to New York City with her girlfriend, Penny, following a messy custody battle over Sofia.

=== Attending physicians ===
Name	Actor	Starring seasons	Recurring/guest seasons	Occupation at Grey Sloan (Or Its Predecessors)	Job Title
Andrew DeLuca	Giacomo Gianniotti	12, 13, 14, 15, 16, 17	11	Attending General Surgeon, Former General Surgical Resident, Former General Surgical Intern	M.D.
Andrew DeLuca was an EMT before deciding to switch to being a surgical intern in Season 12. Soon after his internship begins, he starts a relationship with Maggie Pierce, but that ultimately ends when he doesn't have feelings for her anymore. In Season 14, his ex-girlfriend, Sam Bello, joins Grey Sloan, and they resume their relationship briefly before she leaves the hospital to avoid deportation. In Season 15, after months of chasing her, Andrew starts dating Meredith Grey. At the end of the season, he takes the fall for Meredith's insurance fraud and lands himself in prison. In Season 16, Andrew returns to Grey Sloan to resume his residency, though his relationship ends. At the same time, he also starts showing symptoms of mania, which his sister, Carina, thinks are warning signs of bipolar disorder given their family history, but Andrew goes into denial. In Season 17, Andrew has seemingly recovered from his illness and is revealed to be an attending. He and Teddy are part of the team helping Meredith recover from COVID-19. In the mid-season premiere, Andrew goes after a sex trafficker and saves the victims, but he is stabbed in the process. Though Andrew undergoes immediate surgery, he succumbs to his injuries and dies.
April Kepner	Sarah Drew	7, 8, 9, 10, 11, 12, 13, 14	6, 17, 18	Attending Trauma Surgeon, Former Interim Chief of General Surgery, Former General Surgical Resident	M.D., FACS
First introduced as a surgical resident from Mercy West Hospital during the merger, April Kepner is fired by Richard Webber in Season 6 due to a mistake she made that cost a patient her life. She is later rehired by Derek Shepherd during his run as Chief because he believes her dismissal was unfair, and she eventually develops a crush on him, despite his marriage to Meredith Grey. In the Season 6 finale, she tells him that her best friend, Reed Adamson, has been shot and killed. She later runs into Gary Clark (the shooter) when Derek is shot. Clark lets her go when she emotionally tells him everything about her life. Although April becomes Chief Resident in the Season 7 finale, she fails to pass her Medical Boards and is later fired from Seattle Grace; however, she asked to come back by Owen Hunt because of her strong work ethic and later passes her boards. At her wedding to EMT Matthew Taylor, her best friend and former fling, Jackson Avery, realizes he still loves April and stands up, professing his love. Jackson and April run off and elope; soon after, it is discovered that April is pregnant. However, Jackson and April learn that their unborn baby has a fatal condition, and April is forced to give birth to their stillborn son, Samuel, which causes tension between her and Jackson. Although they get divorced in Season 12, April gives birth to their daughter, Harriet, in the Season 12 finale after they have a one-night stand. In Season 14, April has a crisis of faith following a patient's death but eventually rediscovers her connection with God. Weeks later, she gets into a car accident, and while she is recovering, it is revealed that she has been seeing Matthew Taylor for the last few months. In the Season 14 finale, April quits her job at the hospital to do charity work and spontaneously weds Matthew, officially leaving the hospital. In Season 17, she is revealed to have stayed in the Seattle area, separated from Matthew, and continued her charity work while amicably co-parenting Harriet with Jackson. When Jackson decides to move to Boston to take over the Harper Avery Foundation, April agrees to go with him and Harriet.
Tom Koracick	Greg Germann	16, 17	14, 15, 18, 19, 21	Attending Neurosurgeon, Grey Sloan Memorial Hospital Shareholder, Former Chief Medical Officer, Former Chief of Neurosurgery	M.D, FACS
Previously, the Head of Neurosurgery at Johns Hopkins, Tom Koracick comes to Seattle in Season 14 to remove Amelia's tumor. After performing a successful surgery on her, Koracick stays to cover her cases until she recovers. During this time, it is revealed he had a son who died, which he tells April Kepner. Koracick eventually sticks around long enough to meet Teddy Altman, with whom he starts a relationship despite her expecting a baby with Owen Hunt. As his relationship with Teddy deepens, his medical career also thrives, as he successfully operates on Catherine Avery's cancer. In Season 16, just after Teddy gives birth, Koracick learns that Teddy has realized and professed her love for Owen, ending their relationship. Still, Koracick does not return to Baltimore; instead, he accepts a job as Chief Medical Officer of the Fox Foundation. Though Owen and Teddy get engaged, Teddy soon after begins sleeping with Koracick behind Owen's back. In Season 17, Tom tests positive for COVID-19 and is put on bed rest. He eventually recovers, and near the end of the season, he leaves the hospital to work alongside Jackson at the Catherine Fox Foundation in Boston.
Nick Marsh	Scott Speedman	18, 19	14, 20	Attending Transplant Surgeon, Director of the Residency Program	M.D.
Nick Marsh is introduced in Season 14 as a Transplant Surgeon from the Mayo Clinic in Minnesota. While initially at Grey Sloan to retrieve a liver for a long-time patient, he collapses after surgery. While hospitalized, he flirted and chatted with Meredith Grey while waiting for lab results. It is revealed that he had a kidney transplant five weeks prior and developed a clot which Meredith then removed. Nick is not seen again until Season 18 when Meredith begins to visit Minnesota to develop a cure for Parkinson's frequently. Nick and Meredith strike up a relationship and eventually fall in love. Meredith accepted a job at Mayo but Nick pushed her to stay at Grey Sloan due to the residency program struggling and offered to help with staff shortages. Nick returns to Minnesota at the request of Meredith and they end their relationship. Six months later, Nick returned to Seattle to retrieve an organ and performed a triple organ transplant with Meredith after which she offered him a job as an Attending and Director of the Residency Program.
Nathan Riggs	Martin Henderson	12, 13, 14 (Note: Although he only appeared in the first five episodes of the fourteenth season, Martin Henderson was still billed as a primary cast member in those five episodes.)	—N/a	Attending Cardiothoracic Surgeon	M.D., FACS
Nathan is introduced in Season 12 as Owen Hunt's old friend from the army. Though they used to be best friends, Owen is not happy with Nathan's appearance, and it is later revealed that the cause of their feud is that Owen blames Nathan for his sister, Megan's, disappearance almost ten years ago. Nathan and Megan were engaged, but Nathan had cheated on her in the days leading up to her kidnapping. Still, Nathan works hard at Grey Sloan Memorial as an attending cardiothoracic surgeon, where he works under Maggie Pierce. Eventually, Owen and Nathan make up, just as Nathan spontaneously sleeps with Meredith Grey in the back of her car. After they sleep together, Nathan realizes his feelings for Meredith, as they both bond over the loss of a loved one, and continuously pursues her. Though Meredith resists his advances for some time after finding out that Maggie likes him, she eventually gives in. She sleeps with him during a hectic plane ride, thus beginning their relationship. They date for some time until Megan is found. Nathan and Megan try to resume their relationship, but it struggles to take off when Megan believes that Nathan is still in love with Meredith. Still, with Meredith's pushing, Nathan brings home Megan's son, Farouk, from Iraq, showing that he genuinely loves Megan. Nathan departs from Grey Sloan Memorial after he, Megan, and Farouk move to Los Angeles to restart their lives.
Benjamin "Ben" Warren	Jason Winston George	12, 13, 14, 21, 22	6, 7, 8, 9, 10, 11, 15, 16, 17, 18, 19, 20	General Surgical Resident, Former Attending Anesthesiologist	M.D.
Ben Warren is introduced as an attending anesthesiologist from Mercy West Hospital in Season 6. He also becomes the boyfriend of Miranda Bailey until she breaks up with him after the shooting, finding herself unable to be in a relationship following such a traumatic experience. Ben tries to stay away from Bailey, but they eventually start working together again, though she has begun a relationship with a nurse named Eli. However, she finally ends things with Eli and reunites with Ben. He proposes to Bailey during Season 8, and she accepts. After they get married, Ben gets the chance to become a surgical intern in California. He accepts, much to Bailey's distress. He eventually returns as a surgical resident at Grey Sloan. When talking to Shepherd about his fears of Bailey developing OCD, he realizes he inadvertently reported her, thus straining their marriage. Still, they get through it until Ben decides to change careers for the third time when he wants to become a fireman. This angers Bailey, as she believes he is throwing away the chance to be a great surgeon, but they eventually reconcile. In Season 15, Bailey decides she needs a break from their marriage as she deals with mental health problems. When she says she wants Ben to return home, he tells her not to break his heart again before agreeing to resume their marriage. Ben was a firefighter at Station 19 in Seattle but left to resume his surgical residency at Grey Sloan Memorial. He becomes a fourth-year resident in season 21, where he demonstrated his resourcefulness. However, his tendency to go against protocol puts him at odds with authorities. In season 22, he is named by Bailey as the Chief Resident. Later on, he becomes a Plastics fellow under Toni Wright.
Josephine "Jo" Wilson	Camilla Luddington	10, 11, 12, 13, 14, 15, 16, 17, 18, 19, 20, 21, 22	9	Attending General Surgeon, OB/GYN Resident, Former Surgical Innovation Fellow, Former Chief Resident, Former General Surgical Resident, Former General Surgical Intern, Former Grey Sloan Memorial Hospital Shareholder	M.D.
An intern on Season 9, Jo Wilson is at first made fun of by Alex Karev, who believes she's a rich girl and nicknames her "princess." On the contrary, she had a cruel childhood and has had to work very hard to get through life and become a doctor. Alex gradually warms up to her, and they become close friends. She starts a relationship with an obstetrician, causing Alex to become jealous. She is set to move in with her boyfriend, but they get into a physical fight in which he becomes severely injured. After she leaves her boyfriend, Alex confesses his love to Jo. They start dating but have relationship issues in Season 12 when she turns down Alex's marriage proposal. Things only worsen when Alex beats up Andrew DeLuca after finding him and Jo in a compromising situation, ending up as a doctor in the Denny Duquette Memorial Clinic for a short period. Jo has trust issues with Alex, as she believes he could physically hurt her, but she forgives him once she discovers that Alex had tracked down her ex-husband, Paul, but didn't beat him up. In Season 14, Paul comes to Grey Sloan to sign divorce papers from Jo, whom he calls "Brooke" since she changed her name and ran away when they separated. Paul is still the same manipulative and abusive husband he was years ago, and that scares Jo into signing the papers. Paul threatens Jo's life, but he is soon after killed during a hit-and-run, freeing Jo of her past. In the Season 14 finale, Alex and Jo get married. In Season 15, Jo becomes a surgical innovation fellow under the mentorship of Bailey. She decides to learn more about her past and finds her birth mother, who reveals that Jo was born due to rape. This puts Jo into a depressive state, and she shuts everyone out, including Alex, until she agrees to admit herself to the psych ward. In Season 16, Jo is promoted to Attending General Surgeon, and she and Alex divorce after he leaves Seattle for good. In Season 17, Jo starts a "sex-only" relationship with Jackson Avery. Also, she switches specialties, starting an OB/GYN residency. She becomes pregnant with twins in season 21 and marries Atticus Lincoln. She suffers from severe peripartum cardiomyopathy during her pregnancy in season 22 and gives birth to twin daughters prematurely.

=== Surgical fellows ===
Name	Actor	Starring seasons	Recurring/guest seasons	Occupation at Grey Sloan (or its predecessors)	Job Title
Cristina Yang	Sandra Oh	1, 2, 3, 4, 5, 6, 7, 8, 9, 10	—N/a	Cardiothoracic Surgical Fellow, Director of the Board, Former General Surgical Resident, Former General Surgical Intern	M.D., Ph.D.
Cristina Yang attained a Ph.D. in biochemistry from the University of California, Berkeley and an M.D. from Stanford University School of Medicine. A skilled resident, Cristina has an indomitable passion for cardiothoracic surgery and is almost ruthless in pursuit of her specialty. She is best friends with Meredith Grey and is in a relationship with Preston Burke in the first few seasons until he leaves Cristina on their wedding day. Later she enters a relationship with Owen Hunt, whom she marries in Season 7. At the beginning of Season 9, following the plane crash, she leaves Seattle and works as a cardiothoracic surgical fellow at the Mayo Clinic in Rochester, Minnesota. Like Meredith, she cannot board a plane due to the plane crash trauma, so they barely see each other. However, Cristina returns to Seattle after Craig Thomas, her cardiothoracic attending and mentor at the Mayo Clinic, dies while performing surgery. Towards the end of the season, Cristina and Owen decide to divorce due to their differing opinions about their future. In Season 10, Meredith and Cristina have a falling out due to their different values in life and career paths. Cristina believes that she is more advanced in her career because Meredith chose to have a marriage and kids. Cristina's argument is only strengthened when she is nominated for a Harper Avery Award. However, she loses due to the hospital's connection with the Avery family. Yang meets Burke again, and he offers her his job as the Director of Cardiothoracic Surgery in the prestigious Klausman Institute of Medical Research in Zurich. When Cristina leaves, she has an emotional goodbye with Meredith and Owen, and she leaves with Shane to go to Zurich.

=== Resident physicians ===
Name	Actor	Starring seasons	Recurring/guest seasons	Occupation at Grey Sloan (Or Its Predecessors)	Job Title
Stephanie Edwards	Jerrika Hinton	10, 11, 12, 13	9	General Surgical Resident, Former General Surgical Intern	M.D.
An intern on Season 9, Stephanie Edwards, is similar to Cristina Yang in that she has high hopes for her surgical career. Despite this, she starts dating Jackson Avery after he breaks up with April Kepner, although they break up when Jackson stops April's wedding by professing his love for her. Stephanie then dates a patient, Kyle, but they break up in the days leading up to his death, leaving an emotional impact on her. She leaves at the end of Season 13 following a fire at the hospital to live life outside of a hospital, which she hasn't known since she spent her childhood sick in hospitals.
Alexandra "Lexie" Caroline Grey	Chyler Leigh	4, 5, 6, 7, 8	3, 17	General Surgical Resident, Former General Surgical Intern	M.D.
A resident and the half-sister of Meredith Grey, Lexie Grey attended Harvard Medical School. She has had relationships with Mark Sloan, Alex Karev, and Jackson Avery. Known for her photographic memory, she has earned the nickname "Lexipedia." Initially, she has a distant, contentious relationship with Meredith, but they eventually grow closer. She is often called "Little Grey" by other doctors on staff. In Season 8, she professes her love for Mark, but he does not tell her he loves her back until the plane crash. She dies from her injuries while holding onto Mark. In Season 17, Lexie appears in Meredith's COVID-19 fever dream.
Leah Murphy	Tessa Ferrer	10	9, 13	General Surgical Resident, Former General Surgical Intern	M.D.
An intern on Season 9, Leah Murphy, briefly sleeps with Alex Karev, who is having sex with intern after intern at the time. She often asks her fellow interns questions related to Alex and seems to be hung up on him. She has an affair with Arizona Robbins while Arizona and Callie Torres are separated. However, when Arizona ends their tryst to repair her marriage, Leah becomes hung up on her and hopes for their marriage to end, going as far as to report her and Arizona's relationship to the hospital. In Season 10, Leah is told by Richard Webber that surgery is not for her and should leave the program. In Season 13, she returns as a resident after succeeding at her previous hospital, though she eventually leaves Grey Sloan.
George O'Malley	T.R. Knight	1, 2, 3, 4, 5	17	General Surgical Resident, Former General Surgical Intern	M.D.
George O'Malley has a less aggressive personality compared to his fellow residents. He has an infatuation with Meredith Grey, which ends when they sleep together, and, halfway through, Meredith begins to cry and ultimately rejects him. He has a strong friendship with Izzie Stevens and, later, Lexie Grey. He was once married to Callie Torres, but their marriage came to an end when George slept with Izzie. George and Izzie attempt to have a relationship but decide to remain friends when they realize that their relationship lacks chemistry. Inspired by Owen Hunt's experiences, George decides to leave Seattle Grace and enlist in the Army. Tragically, on his way to tell his mother about joining the Army, George dies when he prevents a girl from being hit by a bus, sacrificing himself instead. In Season 17, George makes an appearance in Meredith's COVID-19 fever-dream.
Shane Ross	Gaius Charles	10	9	General Surgical Resident, Former General Surgical Intern	M.D.
An intern on Season 9, Shane Ross aims to be "the new Shepherd" and even assists on Derek's hand surgery. However, he is frustrated when Derek chooses Heather Brooks as his intern because of her quick reflexes. In Season 10, after he sticks up for Cristina Yang when she and Meredith fight over the 3D printer, he and Yang start a sexual relationship, which only lasts briefly. Later in the season, Ross kills Alex Karev's father, as sleep deprivation causes him to have a mental breakdown. In the Season 10 finale, Ross leaves Seattle for Zurich with Cristina, as he wants to learn from her.
Isobel "Izzie" Stevens	Katherine Heigl	1, 2, 3, 4, 5, 6	—N/a	General Surgical Resident, Former General Surgical Intern	M.D.
After growing up in a trailer park and putting her newborn daughter up for adoption at age 16, Izzie Stevens managed to advance through medical school by modeling to pay her bills. She puts her career as a doctor on the line in a risky bid to get her fiancé, Denny Duquette, a new heart by cutting his LVAD wires. Denny dies, but Izzie keeps her job following invasive therapy sessions put up by the hospital. She then begins a relationship with Alex Karev, and they get married. Their relationship is strained when she is diagnosed with metastatic melanoma. Treatment with Interleukin 2 is successful. After she returns to work in season 6, she accidentally induces hyperkalemia in a patient listed for a renal transplant. She loses her job and leaves Seattle. She and Alex then divorce and she is not seen again until a decade later. In Season 16, it is mentioned that she became a surgical oncologist and got back together with Alex when he visits her in Kansas and learns she is raising their two kids, whom she had through their frozen embryos.
Dr. Levi Schmitt	Jake Borelli	16, 17, 18, 19, 20, 21	14, 15	Co-Chief Resident, General Surgical Resident, Former General Surgical Intern	M.D.
A new intern introduced in Season 14, Levi Schmitt, is widely known as the guy whose glasses fell on a patient during surgery. He has a one-night stand with Jo Wilson, but his relationship with her ends when she gets back together with Alex Karev. Levi begins his intern year worried about his tainted reputation, but Meredith Grey assures him that people don't think of him like that. In Season 15, Levi begins a relationship with the new orthopedic fellow, Nico Kim, and comes out as gay. With this new relationship, Levi becomes more confident. In Season 16, it is revealed that Levi was the one who accidentally turned Meredith in for insurance fraud, which ostracizes him from his peers. He also breaks up with Nico after he realizes they want different things out of the relationship. In Season 17, Levi reconciles his relationship with Nico.

=== Surgical interns ===
Name	Actor	Starring seasons	Recurring/guest seasons	Occupation at Grey Sloan (Or Its Predecessors)	Job Title
Dr. Simone Griffith	Alexis Floyd	19, 20, 21, 22	—N/a	General Surgical Intern	M.D.
A new intern at Grey Sloan Memorial Hospital, where her mother died giving birth to her. Her maternal grandmother has dementia, so she frequently believes that Simone is Simone's late mother. Simone lost her previous residency at another hospital for speaking up against a racist superior and the exchange ended up being a viral video, which makes her reluctant to voice her opinion. Although a tentative relationship begins between her and Adams, she chooses to accept her former fiancé's proposal to marry out of belief that is what her family wants of her. Simone ends living at Meredith's house after the latter moves to Boston.
Dr. Benson Kwan	Harry Shum Jr.	19, 20, 21, 22	—N/a	General Surgical Intern	M.D.
An intern nicknamed "Blue" for his high academic accomplishments. He was forced to drop out of Yale Medical School when his mother became terminally ill and was burdened with medical debt from his mother's treatments after she died. He later completed medical school at a school in the Caribbean. He develops an on-off relationship with Jules Millin.
Dr. Jules Millin	Adelaide Kane	19, 20, 21, 22	—N/a	General Surgical Intern	M.D.
An intern who failed her previous residency placement when she became distracted by a romantic relationship, leading to her hesitation to further pursue any meaningful romantic relationships, including with Kwan. She comes from an eccentric, irresponsible family, where she has been burdened with bailing them out of legal trouble. Millin's roommate is Maxine Anderson, an octogenarian who has been a patient at the hospital.
Dr. Mika Yasuda	Midori Francis	19, 20, 21	—N/a	General Surgical Intern	M.D.
A competitive intern who struggles with student debt, leading to measures like living in her van, selling plasma, and taking a secret job at Joe's bar. Yasuda comes from a family where she is a middle child with seven sisters and one younger brother. After nearly burning out juggling two jobs, her plight is noticed by Taryn Helm, who demands accountability from Chief Altman, who creates a bursary for financially struggling residents like Yasuda. Yasuda and Helm begin dating, but their relationship is complicated when Helm becomes Yasuda's boss as co-chief resident along with Schmitt. She lived at Meredith's house, at the invitation of Maggie Pierce.
Dr. Lucas Adams	Niko Terho	19, 20, 21, 22	—N/a	General Surgical Intern	M.D.
An intern revealed to be nephew of Amelia Shepherd and Derek Shepherd, as the son of one of Derek and Amelia's older sisters. He is desperate to hide his familial connections to Grey Sloan, not wanting others to believe he obtained his position through nepotism, and feels pressure to follow the medical legacies of his aunt and late uncle. Though he is dedicated to saving lives, he has a tendency towards being unable to stay focused and poor judgment, something Nick Marsh suspects is possibly related to undiagnosed ADHD. After he spending weeks living at the Grey Sloan on-call room, Amelia offers to let him live at Meredith's house.

== Supporting characters ==
=== Hospital surgeons ===
The following listings reflect each character's status at the time of their first appearance on staff at Seattle Grace/Seattle Grace Mercy West/Grey Sloan Memorial.

==== Department Chiefs ====
Name	Actor	Season(s)	Episode Count
Michelle Lin	Lynn Chen	18	5
Michelle Lin is introduced in Season 18 as an Assistant Chief of Plastic Surgery at an unknown hospital. Dr. Lin is one of many candidates being interviewed as a possible replacement for Jackson Avery. During her interview, she was granted privileges and asked to scrub in on an emergency plastics case. After surgery she was offered the Chief of Plastic Surgery position and initially rejecting the offer, but Richard Webber persuaded her and she accepted. She is currently the Chief of Plastic Surgery and an Attending ENT Surgeon.

==== Attending physicians ====
Name	Actor	Season(s)	Episode Count
Megan Hunt	Bridget Regan (Season 13), Abigail Spencer	13, 14, 15, 18	10
Megan is Owen Hunt's sister, who worked with him, Teddy Altman, and Nathan Riggs as a surgeon to the army. While overseas, she was kidnapped and taken hostage; after failing to find her, Owen returned to the states to move on. Ten years later, Megan is found and brought to Grey Sloan at the beginning of Season 14. She is operated on by Meredith using a surgery that later wins Meredith a Catherine Fox Award. Following some initial back-and-forth, Megan reconciles with Riggs, whom she was engaged to before being kidnapped. The two move to California with Megan's adopted son, Farouk, to start their lives anew. In Season 15, Megan returns to perform surgery on a fellow veteran. That same season, she also learns that Teddy and Owen are expecting a baby and condemns them for not being together.
Dr. Virginia Dixon	Mary McDonnell	5	3
An exceptional cardiothoracic surgeon who has Asperger syndrome, Dr. Dixon was wooed by Chief Webber to be the next Chief of Cardiothoracic Surgery after Dr. Erica Hahn resigned, but she turned the offer down.
Dr. Rebecca Swender	Kimberly Elise	5	3
A surgical oncology attending assigned to oversee Izzie Stevens's cancer treatment, Dr. Swender is said to be the best surgical oncologist in the state of Washington. She is a proponent for IL-2-use as treatment for cancer, citing its success when a patient, initially given only three months to live, uses the therapy and survives an additional two years. The patient, however, succumbs to complications from the inherent nature of the IL-2, which affects Swender's otherwise authoritarian and impartial persona, and casts doubt on this treatment-protocol.
Dr. Margaret Campbell	Faye Dunaway	5	1
A general surgery attending, Margaret Campbell is Seattle Grace's first female surgeon. With 40 years of surgical experience, she is considered a pioneer and one of the hospital's most respected surgeons. Richard Webber may have been taught by her, which is implied when she recalls an incident involving a clamp dropped into an open body cavity. She has worked with Ellis Grey. Cristina Yang has been vocal about her objections and criticisms of Campbell's continued long-standing service. Due to a complication caused by a lacerated bowel during a routine cholecystectomy, Campbell retires after performing her last surgery to repair the "careless mistake."
Dr. Robert Stark	Peter MacNicol	7	7
An incompetent pediatric surgery attending, Robert Stark is brought in as the interim Chief of Pediatric Surgery when Arizona Robbins gives her notice to oversee a pediatric surgery program in Malawi, Africa. Under contract for a year, Stark continues to serve as the department chief when Robbins returns. Described as a lazy doctor and a complacent and self-satisfied attending, he represents the antithesis of attending surgeons commonly employed at Seattle Grace/Mercy West Hospital. Stark has an antagonistic disposition with most of the hospital staff, especially Alex Karev. April Kepner is the only exception to his behavior. He later attempts to date her, with little success.
Dr. Lucy Fields	Rachael Taylor	7	8
An OB/GYN attending and maternal-fetal medicine fellow at Seattle Grace Mercy West, Lucy Fields is self-proclaimed "damn good at her job." She attended Harvard Medical School and completed her OB/GYN residency at Duke University Medical Center. Lucy is Callie Torres' obstetrician and shows that she is equal parts tough, ironic, and empathetic, especially when dealing with Torres and her support team: Mark Sloan and Arizona Robbins. She seems to have a slight crush on Alex Karev, and they begin to form a relationship. Addison Montgomery returns and is told that she is not able to deal with traumatic pregnancy cases (such as a pregnant Callie involved in a car accident). Alex breaks off his relationship with Lucy in the Season 7 finale, and she goes off to treat children in Africa.
Dr. Nicole Herman	Geena Davis	11, 14	14
Nicole Herman is introduced as the Head of Fetal Surgery at Grey Sloan Memorial Hospital. Arizona works with her as a fellow to specialize in Fetal surgery. It is then revealed that Herman has an inoperable brain tumor and only has six months left to live; thus, she decides she wants to use this time to teach Arizona about Fetal Surgery since it is a new field. When Amelia informs Herman that she believes she could remove the tumor, Herman initially rejects the idea until deciding it's what's best. Amelia operates and, despite some complications, successfully removes Herman's tumor. However, Herman doesn't wake up for several days after the surgery, leading Amelia to look for a cause. An MRI shows signs of a stroke, and when Herman finally wakes up, though she is fully aware of her surroundings and shows no loss of mental faculties, she becomes completely blind. After being discharged from the hospital, Herman goes to the Blind Institute to learn to live her daily life as a blind person. In Season 14, Herman returns to the hospital in fear that her tumor has returned, but it turns out just to be a buildup of cerebrospinal fluid. Herman then offers Arizona an extraordinary opportunity to start the Robbins-Herman Center for Women's Health, which they will institute in New York City.
Dr. Sydney Heron	Kali Rocha	2, 3, 4, 21	9
A fifth-year general surgery resident at Seattle Grace, Sydney Heron is known for her extremely perky personality. She initially appears as Miranda's substitute when Miranda Bailey is on maternity leave. She clashes with Cristina Yang, who finds Sydney's positive attitude unbearable. She later serves as Izzie Stevens' peer counselor and reveals that her perky persona originates from a nervous breakdown she had after losing a patient of her own. Sydney is in the running to become chief resident but loses to Callie Torres, who Bailey later replaces. Sydney goes on one date with Derek Shepherd but dumps him when she decides he isn't ready for the relationship she needs. In Season 21, she returned as the Director of the Residency Program.
Dr. Monica Beltran	Natalie Morales	20, 21, 22	13
Introduced in Season 20, Monica Beltran is a levelheaded pediatric surgical attending. When she is introduced, she is going through a messy divorce to her soon-to-be ex-wife Adriana. Beltran is portrayed as a potential love interest for Amelia Shepherd, though the two never enter a relationship after Beltran turns down Amelia. Later, Beltran hooks up with Winston Ndugu while both are finalizing their divorces. As a pediatric attending, Beltran serves as a bit of a mentor to Levi Schmitt, who, in the beginning of Season 21, is considering applying to a pediatric surgery fellowship. When Schmitt becomes aware he has low chances of being offered the fellowship, Beltran recommends him for a research position in San Antonio, Texas, to help boost his application. Schmitt accepts the position and leaves Grey Sloan, ending his appearance on the show. In Season 21, Beltran's ex-wife Adriana visits Grey Sloan while working as a patient advocate for a patient there. While in Seattle, Adriana sleeps with intern Jules Millin, who was not aware of Adriana's previous relationship with Beltran at the time. After a tense day working together, Beltran tells Millin she doesn't care what happened and to keep her personal life separate from her work.

==== Surgical fellows ====
Name	Actor	Season(s)	Episode Count
Nico Kim	Alex Landi	15, 16, 17, 18, 20	44
Introduced in Season 15, Nico Kim is an orthopedic fellow working under Atticus Lincoln. He is openly gay and, because of this, is initially hesitant to start a relationship with the recently out Levi Schmitt, whom Nico refers to as a "baby gay." Nevertheless, after hooking up during a windstorm, the two begin seeing each other, and Nico encourages Schmitt to stand up to his mother and finally move out of her house. In Season 16, Nico starts distancing himself from Schmitt and only seems to be using him for sex. When Levi demands a more emotional connection and more input into his personal and professional decisions, Nico ends their relationship. In Season 17, at the height of the COVID-19 pandemic, Nico propositions Schmitt after seeing how badly he is processing the stress. This liaison eventually leads to a full reconciliation, with Nico finally giving Levi the emotional attention he desires. Kim left Grey Sloan Memorial Hospital to take a job with the Seattle Mariners

==== Resident physicians ====
Name	Actor	Season(s)	Episode Count
Dr. Reed Adamson	Nora Zehetner	6	10
A surgical resident formerly at Mercy West Hospital before the hospital merger, Reed Adamson is close friends with Charles Percy and April Kepner. She seems to be attracted to Alex Karev and has a one-night stand with Mark Sloan. She is shot in the head by Gary Clark in the Season 6 finale.
Dr. Charles Percy	Robert Baker	6, 8, 12	13
A surgical resident formerly at Mercy West Hospital, Charles Percy is often referred to as "the big guy." He is in love with Reed Adamson, though he never tells her. Gary Clark shoots Percy in the Season 6 finale, and, despite Miranda Bailey's efforts to save him, he dies. He reprises his role in Season 8 in "If/Then" and later in Season 12 in "Unbreak My Heart."
Dr. Taryn Helm	Jaicy Elliot	14, 15, 16, 18, 19, 20	95
A new intern introduced in Season 14. She becomes good friends with another intern, Levi Schmitt, and is often involved in his embarrassing actions. Helm becomes infatuated with Meredith Grey and, during Jo and Alex's wedding, she gets drunk and almost tells Meredith that she's in love with her. In Season 16, Helm gets injured when a car crashes into the doctor's favorite bar resulting in Dr. Bailey and visiting Dr. Webber having to operate on her. While getting prepped for surgery she finally professes her love to Meredith while high on her pain medication. In Season 19, she works at Joe's Bar as a bartender following the residency program's closing. According to Krista Vernoff, she will have a harder time coming back to the hospital than Levi. By the end of Season 19, Helm returns to Grey-Sloan and is named Co-Chief Resident along with Levi Schmitt.

==== Surgical interns ====
Name	Actor	Season(s)	Episode Count
Dr. Steve Mostow	Mark Saul	4, 5, 6, 7, 8	38
Steve Mostow is a surgical intern of Cristina Yang, who calls him "2." In "There's no 'I' in Team," Cristina considers "giving" him to George O'Malley when he finally passes his medical exams. Steve allows the other interns to practice an epidural anesthesia on him and introduce a catheter into his male organs. As a result, he cannot move for a while and is not present at Sadie's operation. Cristina finds him immobilized and finds out about the operation, after which Steve is put on probation, along with the other interns. Steve later sleeps with fellow intern Pierce's girlfriend Megan, and she gets pregnant. Steve and Megan get married, and he is concluded to be the father. During the merger, Megan is fired, but Steve keeps his job, although Derek Shepherd later hires Megan back. According to his blog, he has aspirations to go into neurosurgery as a specialty.
Dr. Graciela Guzman	Gloria Garayua	4, 5, 6	17
Graciela Guzman is a surgical intern of Izzie Stevens, who considers giving her to George O'Malley because she "charts like crap," but keeps her because she can put in a line. Graciela is a nervous student who eats a lot of chocolate when she's nervous. In the episode "In The Midnight Hour," she is the only one who quits the interns' operation on Sadie because she feels it's wrong. Nevertheless, she is put on probation with the other interns.
Intern Pierce	Joseph Williamson	4, 5, 6	23
Pierce is a surgical intern of Alex Karev, who considers giving him to George O'Malley just because Alex hates how his name sounds. Pierce has confronted Alex on at least one occasion, such as when he meets his punishment with the other interns in the episode "In The Midnight Hour" and comments that Izzie Stevens killed a man and was forgiven. Alex responds by physically attacking him. Later in the season, Pierce and Steve fight over Megan, Pierce's girlfriend, who slept with Steve during a breakup. She eventually marries Steve after learning that he is the father of her baby.
Dr. Ryan Spalding	Brandon Scott	5, 6	15
A surgical intern of Cristina Yang, who considers giving him to George O'Malley, Ryan Spalding first appears in the episode "Life During Wartime" and is subsequently named "4.2". In the episode "In The Midnight Hour," Ryan is one of the surgical interns operating on Sadie Harris. He is left on his own in an OR while the others go to get help. He is put on probation with the other interns after Sadie nearly dies in the operation.
Dr. Megan Mostow	Molly Kidder	4, 5, 6	25
Dr. Megan Mostow (nee Nowland) is a resident and former intern of Meredith Grey, who considers giving her to George O'Malley. She has a relationship with Intern Pierce, which ends when she has an affair with Steve, resulting in a pregnancy. During the hospital merger, the Chief fires her by e-mail, and she later decides to sue the hospital, believing her dismissal is related to her pregnancy. She is later rehired by Derek Shepherd, who believes she was fired unjustly and deserves a "fighting chance."
Intern Laura	Candice Afia	4, 5, 6	25
A former surgical intern under Alex Karev, Laura is rebuked by Izzie Stevens when she makes fun of a patient with a facial deformity.
Dr. Sadie Harris	Melissa George	5	8
An intern and former best friend of Meredith, Sadie Harris has self-harm tendencies and later quits Seattle Grace after her medical knowledge and expertise are called into question.
Dr. Norman Shales	Edward Herrmann	4	3
An elderly surgical intern assigned to second-year Alex Karev, Norman Shales is a former pharmacist who, because of his age, is often mistaken by patients for the senior physician. He has since transferred into psychiatry.
Dr. Heather Brooks	Tina Majorino	9, 10	22
An intern on Season 9, Heather Brooks briefly sleeps with Alex Karev, who is having sex with intern after intern at the time. Her quick reflexes contribute to her being picked by Derek Shepherd to receive lessons in the neurosurgical field. Heather dies from complications in the Season 10 premiere after being electrocuted while trying to find Richard Webber. She finds him in a pool of water and steps onto the water before realizing that it was "live." After she's found, Derek and Shane Ross operate and manage to evacuate her subdural hematoma, but her brain swells, and she dies due to raised intracranial pressure.
Dr. Sam Bello	Jeanine Mason	14	12
A Season 14 new intern who, upon attending the new intern mixer the night before her first day, discovers that her ex-boyfriend, Andrew DeLuca, also works at Grey-Sloan Memorial. Despite their best efforts to avoid falling back into their toxic, on-again, off-again relationship, Sam and Andrew ultimately being sleeping together again. In the Season 14 episode "Beautiful Dreamer," Sam is at risk of getting deported to El Salvador by ICE because she had run a red light. To save Sam's medical career and avoid deportation, Meredith Grey sends Sam to continue her residency at Klausman Institute for Medical Research in Zurich, headed by Cristina Yang, effectively ending Sam's relationship with Andrew.
Dr. Casey Parker	Alex Blue Davis	14, 15, 16	13
Another new intern in Season 14 who also has excellent skill in computer hacking. His abilities come in handy when an anonymous hacker breaks into the Grey Sloan computer system and shuts down all electricity and data, causing chaos among doctors and patients; Parker can shut this down by hacking the person back. He then reveals to Miranda Bailey that he first used his computer skills to change his gender on his license, as the DMV wouldn't change it when Parker completed his transition.
Dr. Vikram Roy	Rushi Kota	14, 15	14
A Season 14 intern who is cocky and very confident in his surgical skills. Despite this, he is no better than any of his peers and shows not to hold his head well under intense pressure. During April Kepner's faith crisis, she begins sleeping with Roy, but that eventually ends when she rediscovers herself. In the Season 14 episode "Judgement Day," Roy is fired by Richard Webber after trying to operate under the influence of cannabis. Roy tries to sue for wrongful termination, and Miranda Bailey eventually re-employs him under the agreement that he will be monitored closely by her for the following year. He is later fired a second time by Alex Karev when he causes the death of a patient.
Dr. Dahlia Qadri	Sophia Taylor Ali	14, 15, 16	12
A Season 14 new intern who is proud of her religion and shows it by religiously wearing a hijab. She is attracted to Jackson Avery, and when she has the chance to work on his service, she stumbles over her words in front of him. In Season 16, she is fired by Bailey after yelling at her for firing Meredith.

=== Hospital nurses ===
Name	Actor	Season(s)	Episode Count
Nurse Olivia Harper	Sarah Utterback	1, 2, 3, 4, 6, 14	19
A nurse at the hospital, Olivia has relationships with George and Alex. Alex gives her syphilis, which she then unknowingly gives to George after breaking up with Alex (part of a hospital-wide syphilis epidemic among the doctors and nurses). Alex begins a relationship with Izzie, who finds him cheating on her with Olivia. The female interns sometimes insultingly refer to her as "Syph Nurse." She is a member of the club "Nurses United Against Mark Sloan," which implies she has had sexual relations with him. During the merger, she is fired, and Derek offers to give her a recommendation. Olivia returns in the Season 14 episode, "Bad Reputation," after her son is admitted to the hospital; she runs into Alex but still isn't very fond of him.
Nurse Tyler Christian	Moe Irvin	1, 2, 3, 4, 5, 6, 7, 10	26
Nurse Tyler is one of the members of the nursing staff at Seattle Grace. He attends the nurse strike in Season 2.
Patricia	Robin Pearson Rose	1, 2, 3, 5, 16	12
Patricia is Richard Weber's assistant/secretary and previously worked as a nurse.
Nurse Rose	Lauren Stamile	4, 5	12
A nurse at the hospital, she often works with Derek Shepherd. Rose has been the attending nurse on 36 of Derek's surgeries (as she announced in "Forever Young," Season 4, Episode 8). Derek and Rose share a kiss and are dating, much to Meredith's distress as she tries to get over him. Despite their seemingly happy relationship, Rose is soon bothered by hospital personnel's comments about Meredith and Derek's breakup being only temporary (which end up being true when Derek and Meredith get back together for good). Addison Montgomery sarcastically calls Rose "McRebound," unaware that Rose is in the room. Her prediction proves correct when, in the season finale, "Freedom," Derek and Meredith make up and kiss. Derek abruptly leaves this kiss to break up with Rose, signaling the end of their relationship. Afterward, Rose is hostile towards Derek whenever she sees him but, when she accidentally cuts his hand during surgery, she apologizes and transfers to pediatric surgery.

=== Other hospital physicians ===
Name	Actor	Season(s)	Episode Count
Dr. Katharine Wyatt	Amy Madigan	4, 5, 6	18
A psychiatrist at the hospital, Katharine is Meredith Grey's and Erica Hahn's therapist. As of the episode "Sweet Surrender," Owen Hunt has begun sessions with her.
Dr. Raj Sen	Anjul Nigam	1, 2, 4, 13	8
A psychiatric resident at Seattle Grace, Raj Sen sometimes provides consults for the surgeons.

=== Non-staff physicians ===
Name	Actor	Season(s)	Episode Count
Dr. Finn Dandridge	Chris O'Donnell	2, 3	9
The former veterinarian of Meredith and Derek's dog, Doc, Finn Dandridge is a love interest of Meredith Grey. The interns give him the nickname "McVet," along the same form as Derek's nickname, "McDreamy." Finn dates Meredith, the first woman he's been since his wife, Liz, died in a car accident throughout the end of the second season and beginning of the third season. He competes with Derek for Meredith's heart and ultimately loses to Derek because Meredith is still in love with Derek. Meredith realizes that he may be the "best guy," but he isn't "her guy." After she tells him this, he replies, "he'll break your heart again, Meredith, and when he does, I won't be here," and walks out for the last time.
Dr. Colin Marlowe	Roger Rees	3	3
A professor at Stanford University and a brilliant cardiothoracic surgeon noted for pioneering a procedure called the Marlowe transplant, Colin Marlowe had a three-year relationship with Cristina Yang before she graduated and began her residency at Seattle Grace. He appears months later as a candidate for Chief of Surgery and ultimately withdraws when his true purpose for joining the staff at Seattle Grace, to rekindle his relationship with Cristina, fails.
Dr. William "Will" Thorpe	Scott Elrod	12	4
A surgical oncologist at Bauer Army Medical Center, William Thorpe works on Brian Carson with Meredith Grey, Callie Torres, Jackson Avery, and Jo Wilson. After the surgery is complete, Thorpe flirts with Meredith and the two exchange numbers. Afraid to move on from Derek, Meredith dodges Thorpe's calls until he shows up to pursue her outside of Grey Sloan. Meredith agrees to get drinks with him but freaks out again and cancels. Thorpe shows up in the lobby after Meredith's 17-hour surgery and takes her home, where they talk and eat in his car. After three dates, the two sleep together, but the next morning, Meredith feels like she has cheated on Derek and kicks Thorpe out. Worried about Meredith, Thorpe visits her that night, where she admits that he is the first guy she has dated since Derek died and that she is unable to move on. Thorpe pledges to wait for Meredith, as he believes she is worth waiting for.
Dr. Cass Beckman	Sophia Bush	21	4
An attending trauma surgeon at Seattle Presbyterian Hospital, Cass Beckman and her husband David Beckman meet the Atlman's at a restaurant. Cass Beckman helps out at Grey Sloan during the heatwave. She and her husband have an open relationship and she kisses Teddy while having dinner with her. She later apologizes to both Teddy and Owen for doing so. Later, Teddy and Owen decide to open up their marriage as well, and Teddy and Cass go to a hotel room together. Teddy decides she cannot sleep with Cass because it feels like cheating on Owen, realizing she doesn't want an open marriage, and leaves without sleeping with Cass.

=== Family members ===
==== Meredith Grey's family ====
- Ellis Grey (Kate Burton, Sarah Paulson–1982 flashback, Sally Pressman-1983 flashbacks): Meredith's mother and Maggie's biological mother, a highly respected surgeon who trained at Seattle Grace with Richard Webber. During their residency, she and Richard had an affair. She left her husband Thatcher for Richard, but he could not bring himself to leave his wife. After her residency, she left Seattle to take a position at Mass General. She also worked at the Mayo Clinic. She has won the Harper Avery award twice, and she invented the laparoscopic Grey method. She developed early-onset Alzheimer's shortly before Meredith started medical school and, at the start of the show, she has been placed in Roseridge Home for Extended Care, a nursing home. She dies of cardiac arrest during Season 3. In the episode "Drowning on Dry Land," she appears to her daughter Meredith, encouraging her to go back and live her life. She also appears in an alternate-reality episode from Season 8, called "If/then." In the Season 11 episode, "She's Leaving Home," Meredith gives birth to a daughter, whom she named after her mother. In the Season 14 episode, "Who Lives, Who Dies, Who Tells Your Story," she appears in an OR gallery as an image applauding Meredith as she wins her first Harper Avery award.
- Thatcher Grey (Jeff Perry): Father of Meredith, Lexie, and Molly Grey. He was married to Ellis Grey, Meredith's mother, for about seven years. They divorced after she had an affair with Richard Webber. Thatcher blames Ellis for his estrangement from Meredith, saying Ellis is "cold" and won't let him get to know his daughter. After his first family's disintegration, Thatcher remained in Seattle and married his second wife, Susan. They had two daughters, Lexie and Molly. After Meredith moves to Seattle for her residency, Susan encourages Thatcher and Meredith to develop a relationship. However, Susan's sudden death devastates Thatcher, and he blames her death on Meredith. He becomes an alcoholic, and Lexie has to give up a residency at Massachusetts General Hospital to move to Seattle to care for her father. He eventually enters rehab and apologizes to his daughters. However, his alcoholism has destroyed his liver, and Meredith has to give him a portion of hers to save his life. In season 15, he has not spoken to Meredith since Lexie died and has acute myeloid leukemia. Before he dies, he makes amends with Meredith.
- Susan Grey (Mare Winningham): Meredith's stepmother, who was aware of Meredith though she had not met her until Molly becomes a patient at Seattle Grace. She reaches out to Meredith and encourages her to develop a relationship with Thatcher. At first, Meredith resists Susan's attempts to mother her but eventually thinks of Susan as a surrogate mother. She dies following a rare complication from a routine procedure to treat her acid reflux and hiccups.
- Molly Grey-Thompson (Mandy Siegfried): Daughter of Thatcher and Susan Grey, Lexie's younger full sister and Meredith's half-sister. She proposes to her husband, Eric, before being shipped out by the military to be stationed in Iraq. Originally a patient at Mercy West, Molly transfers to Seattle Grace when she is 32 weeks pregnant, and Addison operates to repair a congenital diaphragmatic hernia in Molly's baby. She later gives birth to a daughter, whom she names Laura.
- Laura Thompson: Daughter of Molly Grey and Eric Thompson and Lexie's niece and Meredith's half-niece. She is born prematurely and kept at Seattle Grace Hospital several weeks after her birth, prompting her grandfather, Thatcher Grey, to hang around.
- Alexandra "Lexie" Grey (Chyler Leigh): Meredith Grey's half-sister. Daughter of Thatcher and Susan Grey. She and Meredith have a rocky relationship at the start but become close as the show progresses. She and Mark Sloan are in a long-term relationship before they are killed in a plane crash.
- Margaret "Maggie" Pierce (Kelly McCreary): Daughter of Ellis Grey and Richard Webber. Meredith's half-sister. Born in Boston, after Ellis and Meredith moved there, leaving Thatcher in Seattle, she was given up for adoption. She becomes a skilled heart surgeon and eventually moves to Seattle, becoming Chief of Cardio at Grey Sloan Memorial Hospital after Cristina Yang leaves.
- Derek Shepherd (Patrick Dempsey): Meredith's husband since Season 5, legally since Season 7. He was originally married to Addison Montgomery; they divorced in the third season. Derek is the father of Zola Grey Shepherd, Derek Bailey Shepherd, and Ellis Shepherd. In season 11, episode 21, "How To Save A Life," his car is T-boned by a semi; he dies of a head injury.

- Zola Grey Shepherd: The adoptive daughter, oldest child and oldest daughter overall of Meredith and Derek who is brought over with the children from Africa under the direction of Karev in Season 7. She has a spinal disease, is treated by Derek with a shunt, and he and Meredith adopted her. In season 19, Zola is discovered to be extremely gifted and has taken an interest in STEM.
- Derek Bailey Shepherd: Son of Meredith and Derek, delivered via C-section due to a face presentation. The obstetrician who operates on Meredith is called away, and an intern completes the stitching. She begins bleeding from everywhere. Meredith diagnoses herself as in DIC. Miranda performs a spleen removal, which saves Meredith's life. Derek and Meredith name their baby after Miranda Bailey.
- Ellis Shepherd: only biological daughter, second biological child and third overall child of Meredith and Derek. She was born during the time jump after Derek's funeral in "She's Leaving Home."

==== Lexie Grey's family ====
- Meredith Grey (Ellen Pompeo): The daughter of Thatcher Grey and Ellis Grey. Meredith is Lexie's older half-sister, whom Lexie meets at the beginning of the fourth season. Although Meredith isn't initially fond of Lexie and does not wish to know her, Meredith eventually warms up to Lexie, and the two become extremely close until Lexie's death.
- Susan Grey (Mare Winningham): The second wife of Thatcher Grey, and mother of Lexie Grey and Molly Grey-Thompson. Susan was always aware of Thatcher's first wife and daughter, but she doesn't meet Meredith until Molly is a patient at Seattle Grace. She reaches out to Meredith and encourages her to develop a relationship with Thatcher. At first, Meredith resists Susan's attempts to mother her but eventually thinks of Susan as a surrogate mother. Susan dies suddenly, following a rare complication from a routine procedure to treat her acid reflux and hiccups. Thatcher is devastated by her death and became an alcoholic.
- Thatcher Grey (Jeff Perry): Father of Meredith, Lexie, and Molly Grey. He was married to Ellis Grey, Meredith's mother, for about seven years. They divorced after she had an affair with Richard Webber. Thatcher blames Ellis for his estrangement from Meredith, saying Ellis is "cold" and won't let him get to know his daughter. After his first family's disintegration, Thatcher remained in Seattle and married his second wife, Susan. They had two daughters, Lexie and Molly. After Meredith moves to Seattle for her residency, Susan encourages Thatcher and Meredith to develop a relationship. However, Susan's sudden death devastates Thatcher, and he blames her death on Meredith. He becomes an alcoholic, and Lexie has to give up a residency at Massachusetts General Hospital to move to Seattle to care for her father. He eventually enters rehab and apologizes to his daughters. However, his alcoholism has destroyed his liver, and Meredith has to give him a portion of hers to save his life.
- Molly Grey-Thompson (Mandy Siegfried): Daughter of Thatcher and Susan Grey, Lexie's younger sister and Meredith's half-sister. She proposes to her husband, Eric, before being shipped out by the military to be stationed in Iraq. Originally a patient at Mercy West, Molly transfers to Seattle Grace when she is 32 weeks pregnant, and Addison operates to repair a congenital diaphragmatic hernia in Molly's baby. She later gives birth to a daughter, whom she names Laura.
- Laura Thompson: Daughter of Molly Grey and Eric Thompson and Lexie's niece and Meredith's half-niece. She is born premature and kept at Seattle Grace Hospital several weeks after her birth, prompting her grandfather Thatcher Grey to hang around. Niece of Alexandra (Lexie) Grey.
- Zola Grey Shepherd (Jela K. Moore, Heaven White): Daughter of Meredith and Derek and half-nieces of Lexie, who is brought over with the children from Africa under the direction of Karev in Season 7. She has a spinal disease but is treated by Derek with a shunt. They later adopt her. She is the half-niece of Alexandra (Lexie) Grey.
- Derek Bailey Shepherd: Son of Meredith and Derek, delivered via C-section because he is not in the correct position. While stitching Meredith up, the obstetrician who operates on Meredith is called away to another patient, and an intern completes the stitching. When she begins bleeding from everywhere, Meredith diagnoses herself as in DIC. Miranda performs a spleen removal, which saves Meredith's life. Derek and Meredith name their baby after Miranda Bailey. He is the half-nephew of Alexandra (Lexie) Grey, although never met by Lexie as she dies before Bailey is born.
- Ellis Shepherd: Second daughter of Meredith and Derek and Lexie's half-niece. She was born during the time jump after Derek's funeral in "She's Leaving Home." She is the half-niece of Alexandra (Lexie) Grey, although Lexie never meets Ellis as she dies before the baby is born.

==== Derek Shepherd's family ====
- Meredith Grey (Ellen Pompeo): Derek's second wife until season 11 episode 21, "How To Save A Life," when he dies of a head injury after a semi t-bones his car. She is the mother of Zola, Bailey, and Ellis.
- Addison Montgomery (Kate Walsh): Derek's first wife who cheated on him with Mark. She comes to Seattle at Richard's request, and the two attempt to reconcile. She ultimately moves to Los Angeles.
- Amelia Shepherd (Caterina Scorsone): Derek's sister and the youngest Shepherd child. She and Derek witnessed their father being murdered. She became addicted to prescription medication before crashing Derek's car while under the influence. Amelia worked with Addison in Los Angeles and is her son's godmother. She has slept with Mark (as have Nancy and Addison before her). She is currently Chief of Neuro at Grey Sloan.
- Zola Grey Shepherd (Jela K. Moore, Heaven White): Daughter of Meredith and Derek, who is brought over with the children from Africa under the direction of Karev in Season 7. She has a spinal disease but is treated by Derek with a shunt. They later adopt her.
- Derek Bailey Shepherd: Son of Meredith Grey and Derek Shepherd, delivered via C-section because he is not in the correct position. While stitching Meredith up, the obstetrician who operates on Meredith is called away to another patient, and an intern completes the stitching. When she begins bleeding from everywhere, Meredith diagnoses herself as in DIC. Miranda performs a spleen removal, which saves Meredith's life. Derek and Meredith name their baby after Miranda Bailey.
- Ellis Shepherd: Second daughter of Meredith and Derek, born nine months after Derek's death.
- Carolyn Maloney-Shepherd (Tyne Daly): Derek's mother, who cared for Derek and his sisters after her husband was murdered. She disapproved of Addison and felt that Derek was much more suited to being with Meredith. Because she thought that Amelia's personality resembled her father, Carolyn distanced herself from her youngest daughter out of grief, which strained their relationship as she let Derek regretfully take responsibility for watching out for Amelia.
- Kathleen "Kate" Shepherd (Amy Acker): One of Derek's sisters, initially only mentioned in passing before appearing in "Good Shepherd", apparently is married to a diplomat and has children. Derek mentions she is a therapist, though Amelia later indicates she is a psychiatrist. She and Nancy have a poor relationship with Amelia.
- Liz Shepherd (Neve Campbell): One of Derek's sisters, also married with children. After the nerves in Derek's hand are damaged in a plane crash, she donates a nerve in her leg to repair his hand. Like her siblings, she is a doctor though her specialty is unknown and though it is unlikely that she is a psychiatrist or a neurosurgeon. She tries to encourage Meredith to reach out to the Shepherds more because they are family.
- Nancy Shepherd (Embeth Davidtz): One of Derek's sisters. She slept with Mark (as revealed in the episode "Let The Angels Commit"). She tells her brother, "Come on, Derek. Everyone sleeps with Mark." She dislikes Meredith and admires Addison, possibly due to their being OB/GYN doctors.
- Alexandra "Lexie" Caroline Grey (Chyler Leigh): Becomes Derek's half sister-in-law when he and Meredith Grey marry. Lexie later dies in the plane crash in the season 8 finale titled 'Flight.'
- Margaret "Maggie" Pierce (Kelly McCreary): Becomes Derek's half-sister-in-law when he and Meredith marry.
- Scout Derek Shepherd-Lincoln: Son of Amelia and Link, therefore Derek's nephew. He was born in the Season 16 finale, and he was named in the Season 17 premiere.
- Lucas Adams: Nephew of Derek Shepherd, the son of one of Derek and Amelia's older sisters. Surgical intern at Grey Sloan beginning in season 19.

==== Cristina Yang's family ====
- Helen Yang Rubenstein (Tsai Chin): Cristina's mother. Helen and Cristina's father divorced (Cristina watched her father die as they were both in a car accident), and she remarried Dr. Saul Rubenstein, an oral surgeon when Cristina was three. She thinks Cristina should focus more on getting married and less on her career.

==== Izzie Stevens's family ====
- Alex Karev (Justin Chambers): Izzie's ex-husband and current lover. The two of them divorced in season 6 but reconciled in season 16 after Alex visits her in Kansas and learns that she is raising their two children.
- Hannah Klein (Liv Hutchings): The adoptive daughter of Caroline and Dustin Klein, and the biological child of Izzie Stevens (born 1996). In the third season, an 11-year-old Hannah is admitted to Seattle Grace Hospital with leukemia, and Izzie donates bone marrow to her. However, Hannah's parents believed she was too exhausted from treatment to meet her mother.
- Robbie Stevens (Sharon Lawrence): Izzie's mother, who now works as a waitress.
- Denny Duquette Jr. (Jeffrey Dean Morgan): Izzie's 36-year-old fiancé for a short time before he died of a stroke after receiving a heart transplant. In his will, he leaves Izzie $8,700,000, with which she opens the "Denny Duquette Memorial Clinic" that provides free health checkups to patients.
- Eli Stevens and Alexis Stevens (Mark Nunez and Kennedy Bryan): Fraternal twin son and daughter of Izzie Stevens and Alex Karev (born 2014). Izzie decided to freeze her eggs during the fifth season episode "Elevator Love Letter" when she was diagnosed with cancer, as they would not survive the cancer treatment. But, to give them a better chance at being viable, Alex fertilized them as embryos had a stronger chance for survival. When Alex called Izzie for help during Meredith's medical license trial, he discovers he is a father—something his second wife theorized was a possibility in the twelfth season episode "I Choose You".

==== Richard Webber's family ====
- Camille Travis (Tessa Thompson / Camille Winbush): Adele's niece, daughter of Adele's sister Arlene. She was diagnosed with ovarian cancer when she was 14, and the cancer returns when she is a senior in high school. Dr. Bailey orders the interns to plan a prom in the hospital for her.
- Arlene Travis (Shelley Robertson): Adele's sister and Camille's mother.
- Adele Webber (Loretta Devine): Dr. Webber's first wife. Frequently frustrated by his devotion to the hospital, she eventually leaves him. She becomes pregnant with his child but has a miscarriage. They later reconciled. She was diagnosed with Alzheimer's disease. She dies of a heart attack in the Season 9 winter premiere.
- Catherine Fox (Debbie Allen): Richard's second wife, a world-renowned urologist and the series' main antagonist, whom he marries in season 11.
- Margaret "Maggie" Pierce (Kelly McCreary): Richard's biological daughter with Ellis Grey. A cardiothoracic surgeon and former child prodigy who takes over as Chief of Cardio after Cristina leaves for Switzerland.
- Chris Webber (Matt Orduña): Richard's brother. The two have a very tense relationship.
- Sabrina "Sabi" Webber (Crystal McCreary): Chris Webber's daughter and Richard's niece. Sabi comes to Richard for help with biatrial myxoma.

==== George O'Malley's family ====
- Harold O'Malley (George Dzundza): Father of George, he was a truck driver with a passion for vintage cars. He was married for 40 years to his wife, Louise, and they had three sons: Jerry, Ronny, and George. He is very proud of all of his sons, but he often has trouble relating to George. He is admitted to Seattle Grace with esophageal cancer that has spread to his stomach, as well as a leaking aortic valve. He undergoes surgery to replace the valve successfully and later has a second surgery to determine the extent of the cancer. Before the second surgery, he asks Dr. Webber and Dr. Bailey to remove the tumor regardless of the risk to give him a chance to fight the cancer. The surgery proves too much for his body and, after several days, he goes into multi-system organ failure, which prompts the family to remove him from life support.
- Jerry O'Malley (Greg Pitts): George's brother, who works at a dry cleaner.
- Louise O'Malley (Debra Monk): George's mother, who works as a teacher. George seems to find her a little overbearing and is often embarrassed by her good-natured gestures, such as setting out breakfast for the interns during rounds and offering to iron his scrubs. She is a devout Catholic, and she is very upset when George and Callie get divorced.
- Ronny O'Malley (Tim Griffin): George's brother, who works at the post office.

==== Alex Karev's family ====
- Izzie Stevens (Katherine Heigl): Alex's first wife and current lover, a former Grey Sloan Memorial Hospital surgical resident and later surgical oncologist whom he divorces in season 6 but reconciles with in season 16.
- Jo Wilson (Camilla Luddington): Alex's second wife, a surgical innovation fellow who works at Grey Sloan Memorial Hospital and who he later divorces in season 16 to go live with ex-wife Izzie Stevens.
- Jimmy Evans (James Remar): Alex's father, a heroin addict, who was often gone during his childhood. He used to beat Alex and Aaron, while Amber was too young during that time to recall Jimmy's behavior to her brothers. It's still unexplained how he disappeared from Alex's life, but since Alex, Aaron, and Amber spent most of their childhood in and out of foster care, it's assumed he just left. Because of how Jimmy beat up Alex's mother, Alex became a wrestler to defend his mother. In season ten, he returns unknowingly into Alex's life due to being brought to Grey Sloan Hospital for treatment. By then, it has been revealed that he was living as a struggling musician. After arriving in an ambulance, he asks Alex for something, which causes Alex to realize the patient might be his father. Though Alex does not want to know the result of a DNA-match suggested by Jo, she reveals the results anyway, which confirms that Jimmy is Alex's father. Alex begins secretly visiting the bar where his father starts playing after recovering, and during one visit, Jimmy and Alex talk of childhood and regrets. Because Jimmy had taught Alex how to play guitar as a child, Alex assumes the discussion is about him and is goaded into playing a tune that brings memories back to Jimmy. When Alex learns that Jimmy is talking about Nicky, his son, by another woman, Alex angrily beats his father. Jimmy fails to understand Alex's anger when the latter tells Jimmy never to return to Nicky and his mother until after Alex leaves and Jimmy realizes that Alex is his son. During Jimmy's attempts to go clean, he winds up in the hospital from through withdrawal. Jo has to take care of him, which causes strain in her and Alex's relationship.
- Aaron Karev (Jake McLaughlin): Alex's younger brother, who works as a mover. He is very nice and polite, so Cristina names him "Angel Spawn," while she calls Alex "Evil Spawn." He comes to Seattle Grace with a hernia, which Dr. Bailey successfully repairs. He's very chatty and tells the doctors about his and Alex's troubled childhood. He is later diagnosed with schizophrenia after he has a psychotic break and tries to kill his younger sister, Amber. As a result, he has been committed to a psychiatric ward.
- Amber Karev: Alex's younger sister, a high school student. Aaron is trying to convince her to go to college, but she doesn't see the point.
- Nicky Evans: Alex's younger paternal half-brother. It's assumed he still lives with his mother in South Florida.
- Helen Karev (Lindsay Wagner): Alex's mother. Helen was diagnosed with a mental disorder but has recovered enough to resume her job at her local library. Alex and Jo visit her in Iowa in season 14 episode "Fight For Your Mind."
- Eli Stevens and Alexis Stevens (Mark Nunez and Kennedy Bryan): Son and daughter of Izzie Stevens and Alex Karev. Izzie decided to freeze her eggs during Grey's fifth season when she was diagnosed with cancer, as they would not survive the cancer treatment. But, to give them a better chance at being viable, Alex fertilized them. Izzie asked Alex to give her his sperm to freeze her embryos to have children one day. Izzie left Seattle Grace and started anew on a farm in Kansas. Izzie later divorced Alex and kept the fertilized embryos, which she used to have the twins. Later in Season 16, Meredith was going through legal trouble, and Alex called Izzie to write a letter to the medical counsel on why Meredith should keep her medical license. Izzie and Alex caught up, and he found out that he was the father of her twins. In Season 16, he leaves Grey Sloan and Jo and goes to Kansas to meet his kids and meet Izzie. He later wrote letters to Jo, Meredith, Richard, and Bailey, explaining what had happened and why he left.

==== Miranda Bailey's family ====
- Tucker Jones (Cress Williams): Miranda's ex-husband who divorces her because she spends more time working than at home with him and Tuck. Tucker is operated on by Derek when he is involved in a car accident on his way to the hospital for their son's birth.
- William George "Tuck" Bailey Jones: Miranda's son with her ex-husband Tucker.
- Ben Warren (Jason George): Miranda's current husband, whom she marries in Season 9.
- Joey Phillips (Noah Alexander Gerry): Miranda and Ben's adoptive son, who currently lives with them.
- Pruitt Arike Miller (Janai Kaylani): Dean Miller and JJ Lau's daughter, who was adopted by Miranda and Ben after the death of Dean.

==== Mark Sloan's family ====
- Unnamed grandson: Mark's grandson through Sloan, who gave him up for adoption.
- Sloan Riley (Leven Rambin): Mark's biological daughter. As an 18-year-old, she gives birth to Mark's grandson and puts him up for adoption.
- Sofia Robbins Sloan Torres: Mark's daughter with Callie Torres and Arizona Robbins. Conceived after Mark and Callie begin several trysts after Callie is left in the airport by Arizona, she is born prematurely on March 31, 2011, in "Song Beneath the Song."

==== Teddy Altman's family ====
- Henry Burton (Scott Foley): Husband of Dr. Teddy Altman. She meets and marries him in Season 7 to use her health insurance to cover the ongoing costs of his treatment for Von Hippel–Lindau disease. They eventually fall in love. He dies in season 8 while undergoing surgery.
- Owen Hunt (Kevin McKidd): Current husband of Dr. Teddy Altman. She was in the army with him, eventually got married after a long day of interruptions in Season 18.
- Allison Hunt: Daughter with Owen, born in season 15.
- Leo Hunt: Adopted kid with Owen.

==== Callie Torres's family ====
- Uncle Berto: Callie's uncle, whom she assumes might be gay, saying "he hasn't been single for 60 years for no reason."
- Arizona Robbins (Jessica Capshaw): Callie's ex-wife. A pediatric surgery attending, Arizona comes from a military family.
- Aria Torres: Callie's sister, only mentioned on the show.
- Carlos Torres (Héctor Elizondo): Father to Dr. Callie Torres. He originally is against his daughter's bisexuality and relationship with Dr. Arizona Robbins.
- Lucia Torres (Gina Gallego): Mother to Dr. Callie Torres. She has problems with accepting her daughter's bisexuality and refuses to attend her wedding to Arizona.
- Sofia Robbin Sloan Torres: Callie's daughter, born prematurely on March 31, 2011, in "Song Beneath the Song." She is conceived after Mark and Callie begin several trysts when Callie is left in the airport by Arizona.

==== Arizona Robbins's family ====
- Barbara Robbins (Judith Ivey): Arizona's mother.
- Colonel Daniel Robbins, United States Marine Corps (Denis Arndt): Arizona's father.
- Timothy Robbins: Arizona's brother, who died in the Iraq war.
- Callie Torres (Sara Ramirez): Arizona's ex-wife and attending orthopedic surgeon at Grey Sloan Memorial Hospital. They reconcile after Robbins's departure.
- Sofia Robbin Sloan Torres: Arizona's daughter, born prematurely on March 31, 2011, in the "Song Beneath the Song" episode. She is conceived after Mark and Callie begin several trysts when Callie is left in the airport by Arizona. Arizona now has sole custody of Sofia due to a family court ruling in season 12.

==== Jackson Avery's family ====
- Dr. April Kepner: Avery's ex-wife, current lover, and former Trauma surgeon at Grey Sloan Memorial Hospital. After Jackson confesses his feelings for April at the altar during her wedding to paramedic Matthew Taylor, April and Jackson elope. They have had an on and off again relationship and built-in sexual tension since Jackson took April's virginity before their board exam. April failed and blamed Jackson for Jesus punishing her for premarital sex. The two of them reconciled in season 18.
- Samuel Norbert Avery: Avery and Kepner's late son born at 24 weeks due to type II osteogenesis imperfecta. He was baptized before dying soon after in his parents' arms.
- Harriet Kepner-Avery: Avery and Kepner's daughter. She was conceived during a moment of passion between April and Jackson amid their fighting. Things aren't patched up after their one-night affair, and they decided to divorce. Before signing the divorce papers, April discovered she was pregnant. Overjoyed that she could still conceive, she decided to keep the pregnancy secret out of fear that something is wrong, like her last pregnancy. After a while, Arizona Robbins discovers that April is pregnant and urges her to tell Jackson, and when April doesn't do it, Arizona does it herself. Jackson is at first angry but comes to understand it, and they agree to raise her as co-parents. Harriet was born during a cesarean section with April under no anesthesia because April was in Meredith's kitchen, and there was no way to go to the hospital. Soon, Catherine comes to accept April as a mother, and since Jackson and April decided to give Harriet both of their last surnames, Catherine is finally happy to see the Avery name kept alive. She was named after the abolitionist Harriet Tubman.
- Dr. Catherine Fox (formerly Avery) (Debbie Allen): Avery's mother, a brilliant urological surgeon, and the show's primary antagonist. She appears at Seattle Grace Mercy West to perform the "first" penis transplant in the U.S. She proctors the boards in San Francisco, where she also has a one-night affair with Dr. Webber. She and Dr. Webber eventually began a relationship and are now married.
- Dr. Richard Webber: Avery's stepfather, following his marriage to Catherine Fox.
- Dr. Harper Avery: Grandfather of Jackson Avery and a world-renowned surgeon. In Season 14, it's revealed that he was a sexual predator who settled over a dozen lawsuits for harassing and assaulting women, and that the settlements kept his reputation pristine. His grandson repudiates him, and the foundation named for him changes its name and mission in honor of Catherine Fox.
- Robert Avery (Eric Roberts): Avery's father and Catherine Fox's ex-husband, appears in "Who Is He (And What Is He to You)?". He considered himself unsuited to being an Avery and living up his father's medical legacy, Dr. Harper Avery, and left his family behind and has not since thought of his son. Jackson meets him in Bozeman, Montana, where Robert is satisfied with owning a local diner. While Jackson is glad to have met him, he informs Robert that he does not consider him his father.

=== Guest stars ===
- Marla Sokoloff as Glenda Castillo (2015)
- Neve Campbell as Lizzie Shepherd (2012)
- Summer Glau as Emily Kovach (2012)
- James Avery as Sam (2012)
- Nia Vardalos as Karen (2012)
- Demi Lovato as Hayley May (2010)
- Paola Andino as Lily Price (2010)
- Mandy Moore as Mary Portman (2010)
- Vanessa Martínez as Gretchen Price (2010)
- Ryan Devlin as Bill Portman (2010)
- Jennifer Westfeldt as Jen Harmon (2009)
- Faye Dunaway as Dr. Margaret Campbell (2009)
- Bernadette Peters as Sarabeth Breyers (2008)
- Seth Green as Nick Hanscom (2007)
- Maggie Siff as Ruthie Sales (2007)
- Bellamy Young as Kathy (2007)
- John Cho as Dr. Marshall Stone (2006)
- Laurie Metcalf as Beatrice Carter (2006)
- Christina Ricci as Hannah Davies (2006)
- Millie Bobby Brown as Ruby (2014)

=== Other characters ===
- Joe the Bartender (Steven W. Bailey): The owner of the Emerald City Bar, located across from the hospital, where the doctors often go for a drink. Joe collapses due to an aneurysm in the episode "Raindrops Keep Falling on my Head," and Derek and Burke perform a stand-still surgery to repair it. Joe and his boyfriend Walter attend the Thanksgiving dinner Izzie hosts at Meredith's house, and they go on a camping trip with Dr. Shepherd, Preston, Richard, Alex, and George. During the trip, Joe reveals during a discussion with the Chief that, although he and Walter have been "on-and-off" for about ten years, they are now committed and considering the possibility of children. They are one of two couples being considered as adoptive parents for a young mother's twins.
- Walter (Jack Yang): Joe's boyfriend.
- Bonnie Crasnoff (Monica Keena): A patient admitted to Seattle Grace Hospital after being involved in a train crash, she and another passenger, Tom, are connected by a large metal pole passing through their bodies. Since moving the pole would kill them, the doctors decide to move one of the patients off the pole and then operate around the pole to repair the other patient's damage. Since her injuries are more severe, they decide to move her, and she dies almost immediately. Bonnie reappears in Season 3 as part of Meredith's dream after drowning.
- Dennison "Denny" Duquette, Jr. (Jeffrey Dean Morgan): A patient waiting for a heart transplant, he develops a close relationship with Izzie and eventually proposes to her. Izzie risks her career to save him by cutting his LVAD wire, ensuring that he will become so ill that he will get a new heart. He dies from a blood clot shortly after the transplant but reappears in Season 3 as part of Meredith's dream after she nearly drowns, and again in Season 5. Izzie begins to see Denny everywhere, which is eventually revealed to be a symptom of her brain tumor. He first appears in the Season 2 episode "Begin the Begin" and makes his last appearance in the Season 5 episode "Here's to Future Days."
- Dylan Young (Kyle Chandler): As the commanding officer of the Seattle Police Department bomb squad, he responds to the bomb scare and helps to keep Meredith calm as she holds the bomb located inside a patient's body. She removes the bomb safely from the patient, but it explodes while Dylan carries it out of the OR. He reappears in Season 3 as part of Meredith's dream after her near-drowning.
- Amanda (Shannon Lucio): A young woman saved from being hit by a bus by George, who was himself subsequently dragged several yards by the bus and dies. Amanda is extremely concerned about him, and she stays with him in the ICU, referring to him as "her prince." She attends George's funeral and cries harder than his mother. Amanda keeps a daily vigil outside the hospital until Izzie confronts her, pointing out that she is still alive thanks to George and that she should honor him by living her life.
- Rebecca Pope or "Ava" (Elizabeth Reaser): A patient with amnesia after being badly injured in the ferry crash, she is discovered by Dr. Alex Karev, and they develop a very close relationship. While at Seattle Grace, she delivers a baby girl and undergoes extensive facial reconstruction surgery, performed by Dr. Mark Sloan. She eventually regains her memory and returns home with her husband, Jeff. However, before leaving, she pleads with Alex to "give [her] a reason to stay." She returns six weeks later, claiming to be pregnant with Alex's child. Although initially upset, Alex eventually becomes excited about having a baby with her. However, she is found to have a false pregnancy. When she attempts suicide, Izzie intervenes and has her admitted to the psychiatric ward. Elizabeth Reaser was nominated for the Outstanding Guest Actress in a Drama Series at the 59th Primetime Emmy Awards, for her role on the show.
- Gary Clark (Michael O'Neill): Husband of a patient at Seattle Grace, his wife is treated by Dr. Lexie Grey and Dr. Webber. After surgery, his wife goes into a coma and, since she has earlier signed a DNR, she is removed from life support. Clark files a lawsuit against Dr. Shepherd for wrongful death, but loses. In the Season 6 finale, he returns to the hospital intending to kill Dr. Shepherd, Dr. Lexie Grey, and Dr. Webber. He shoots several people, including Derek Shepherd, Owen Hunt, Reed Adamson, Charles Percy, and Alex Karev. After a tense standoff with Dr. Webber, he uses his last bullet to commit suicide instead of killing Dr. Webber.
- Mary Portman (Mandy Moore): Miranda Bailey's patient during the Seattle Grace shooting, she is married to Bill Portman. She helps Miranda attempt to save Charles Percy's life, and, despite their efforts, he dies. She returns to the hospital six months later to have the colostomy reversal she was supposed to have had the day of the shooting. Although the surgery is successful, Mary never wakes up. She is removed from life support one month later and dies.
- Bill Portman (Ryan Devlin): Husband of Mary Portman.
- Dr. Penny Blake (Samantha Sloyan): Derek Shepherd's doctor when he was brought into Dillard Medical Center after a semi T-bones him. He consequently dies after failing to get a head CT. She later begins dating Callie Torres and transfers to Grey-Sloan as a surgical resident, where Meredith works. Meredith makes life difficult for Penny to work, but they eventually overcome their differences and work together because Meredith sees her potential as a general surgeon. She wins a grant and moves to New York, sparking a custody battle between Callie and Arizona when Callie wants to take Sofia with her.
