= Anthony Hill (actor) =

American actor (born 1987)

- Born: November 11, 1987 (age 39); Springfield, Missouri, U.S.
- Education: Oklahoma State University (BA)
- Occupation: Actor
- Years active: 2011–present

Anthony Hill (born November 11, 1987) is an American actor. He is best known for starring as Dr. Winston Ndugu in the ABC medical drama series, Grey's Anatomy (2020–present).

== Early life and education ==
Hill was born in Springfield, Missouri and raised in the Overland Park, Kansas neighborhood of Kansas City. He has a sister, Erica.

He attended Rosehill Elementary and Indian Woods Middle School. He graduated from Shawnee Mission South High School and then attended Coffeyville Community College. After graduating, he moved onto Oklahoma State University in 2008 on a theatre scholarship. He played on the OSU football team and became a letterman. He graduated in 2011, with a Bachelor's Degree in Business Entrepreneurship and Management. He planned on a football career, but while he was injured, he found his love for acting and theater. He then moved to Los Angeles.

== Acting career ==
Initially, he had success working on commercials. He then landed several acting roles on shows such as NCIS, How To Get Away With Murder, and It’s Always Sunny in Philadelphia. He has played Dr. Winston Ndugu on Grey's Anatomy since 2020.

== Personal life ==
Hill lives in Santa Clarita, just north of Los Angeles.

== Filmography ==
Year	Title	Role	Notes
2011	Dearwolfe Series	Turgid Member Bassist	Independent Video Project
2012	Backbone of the Army	PFC Cook	Independent Video Project
2014	So Jaded	Jay	TV film
2014	NCIS	Navy Petty Officer Third Class; John Blaney "JB" Hicks	Episode: "Semper Fortis"
2015	Looking	Robert	Episode: "Looking for the Promised Land"
2015	Scorpion	Tech Marder	Episode: "Young Hearts Spark Fire"
2015	Scream	Deputy Mike Newsome	3 episodes
2015	Nuts	Will	Short film
2016	How to Get Away with Murder	Noah	Episode: "She Hates Us"
2016	Fuller House	Barista	Episode: "The Not-So-Great Escape"
2016	Colony	Checkpoint Redhat	Episodes: "A Brave New World" and "Gateway"
2016	Rebirth	Nate	Film
2016	Silicon Valley	Douglas	Episode: "Daily Active Users"
2016	Rizzoli & Isles	Kyle Price	Episode: "Dead Weight"
2016	Rush Hour	Bartender	Episode: "O Hostage! My Hostage!"
2016	Pretty Vacant	Anthony	6 episodes; miniseries
2016	NCIS: Los Angeles	Waiter/Jason	Episode: "Glasnost"
2016	Off Book	Barista Dez	Short film
2017	It's Always Sunny in Philadelphia	Black Mac	Episode: "The Gang Turns Black"
2017	Young & Hungry	Justin	Episode: "Young & Josh's Dad"
2017	Future Man	Malcolm	Episode: "Herpe: Fully Loaded"
2018	Faith Under Fire	Mr. Carmichael	TV film
2018	For The People	Guy Watson	Episode: "Have You Met Leonard Knox?"
2019	Watchmen	Marcus Abar	Episode: "An Almost Religious Awe", Miniseries
2019-2023	Station 19	Neil	Episode: "Crazy Train"
2019-2023	Station 19	Dr. Winston Ndugu	Episode: "We Build Then We Break"
2020-present	Grey's Anatomy	Dr. Winston Ndugu	104+ episodes
2021	This is Us	Marshall Winston	Episode: "Birth Mother"
