= Grey's Anatomy season 21 =

Season of television series

Grey's Anatomy
- Season 21
- Promotional poster
- Showrunner: Meg Marinis
- Starring: Ellen Pompeo; Chandra Wilson; James Pickens Jr.; Kevin McKidd; Caterina Scorsone; Camilla Luddington; Jason George; Kim Raver; Jake Borelli; Chris Carmack; Anthony Hill; Alexis Floyd; Harry Shum Jr.; Adelaide Kane; Midori Francis; Niko Terho
- No. of episodes: 18

Release
- Original network: ABC
- Original release: September 26, 2024 – May 15, 2025

Season chronology
- ← Previous; Season 20 Next → Season 22

The twenty-first season of the American medical drama television series Grey's Anatomy was announced on April 2, 2024, and premiered in the United States on the American Broadcasting Company (ABC) on September 26, 2024.

Although announced as departing during the season, Jake Borelli and Midori Francis retain their series regular status. Both have been series regulars since the sixteenth and nineteenth seasons, respectively. Jason George was promoted as a series regular again once the spin-off Station 19 concluded.

== Episodes ==
No. overall	No. in season	Title	Directed by	Written by	Original release date	U.S. viewers (millions)
431	1	"If Walls Could Talk"	Debbie Allen	Meg Marinis	September 26, 2024	2.70
Meredith Grey and Catherine Fox are at odds over their Alzheimer's research, with Catherine blocking Meredith's efforts to secure outside funding. Jackson convinces Meredith to apologize for the greater good, but when she tries, Catherine collapses due to complications from her cancer, which has put her at risk of liver failure. Catherine makes a deal with Meredith: if she follows Catherine's wishes regarding her treatment and keeps her condition secret from Jackson and Richard, Meredith and her team can have their jobs back. Meanwhile, Bailey struggles with her recent firing and her dislike of her replacement, Sydney Heron. She grapples with whether or not she should fight for her job and is inspired to do so after dealing with a patient trapped in the hospital walls. Lucas, torn between staying in Seattle or moving to Chicago, chooses love over his career and stays to be with Simone, while fellow interns Jules and Mika confront their own romantic dilemma. Schmitt, facing a career crisis, receives advice from Link, who also learns Jo is pregnant. Webber reenters the OR, passing on valuable surgical knowledge to Winston.
432	2	"Take Me to Church"	Kevin McKidd	Michelle Lirtzman	October 3, 2024	2.51
Catherine's health is deteriorating, and she's resisting medical help despite worsening signs of cancer, pushing away both Richard and Jackson. Meredith flies back to Seattle to monitor her, discovering liver lesions that may be cancerous. Enlisting Bailey, Meredith confronts Catherine's reluctance to pursue treatment. Catherine ultimately agrees to a biopsy after a heartfelt intervention from Bailey and Meredith. Meanwhile, Kwan is overwhelmed by the sudden return of his ex-fiancée Molly, who has amnesia. As they reconnect, painful memories resurface for Kwan, especially his guilt over her accident. He attempts to find closure, but an awkward kiss makes things more confusing. Schmitt treats Cal, a teen battling multiple cancers due to Li-Fraumeni syndrome, and he has to deal with hospital chaplain James who Cal leans on for support. After a successful surgery, Cal's condition worsens with a malignant brain tumor, leaving him with just weeks to live. Schmitt, deeply moved, helps Cal create a bucket list, including a hopeful trip to space camp. Winston takes Richard and Adams golfing to help Richard rediscover his confidence in surgery. The day inspires Richard to reconsider stepping back, handing Teddy the Chief of Surgery role, but signaling his return to the OR.
433	3	"I Can See Clearly Now"	Victoria Mahoney	Mark Driscoll	October 10, 2024	2.36
Catherine's secret liver biopsy takes a dangerous turn, forcing Meredith and Bailey to act quickly. This leaves Richard blindsided and furious when he finds out about their deception. Meanwhile, Bailey navigates a career shift, with Catherine reinstating her as director of the residency program, removing Sydney from the position. Nick distracts Richard with an awake kidney transplant surgery, but tensions rise between Lucas and Simone as Lucas is chosen over her to assist, which she thinks is nepotism. They end up resolving the conflict and reaffirming their love for each other. In another case, Amelia takes on a risky surgery for a pregnant surrogate with a tumor, leading to intense debates in the OR. Amelia's decision echoes her late brother Derek's legacy of tackling impossible cases. Levi flirts with Grey Sloan's chaplain, James, while handling an older patient's unconventional refusal to sign a DNR order until her ex-husband dies. Meanwhile, Mika breaks things off with Jules after she finds out her sister has been diagnosed with colon cancer.
434	4	"This One's for the Girls"	Debbie Allen	Briana Belser	October 17, 2024	2.04
Mika's sister Chloe arrives at Grey Sloan Memorial for treatment of stage 3B colorectal cancer. Mika is deeply affected, feeling useless despite being a surgeon. Determined to help, she explores fertility-saving procedures for Chloe. Jules steps in to emotionally support Chloe in the OR, while Mika's friends take over her shifts so she can be with her sister. Elsewhere, Ben Warren returns as a fourth-year surgical resident, encountering both support and challenges. He and Kwan work together to save a patient with a serious infection from a Brazilian butt lift. Ben's return brings tension, especially with his wife, Miranda Bailey, who worries about him as he adjusts to new hospital protocols. Owen and Teddy face marital issues, while Winston struggles with post-divorce frustrations and work stress. Schmitt begins a new relationship with James, but after they sleep together, he uncovers a wedding album that makes him question James' motives.
435	5	"You Make My Heart Explode"	Vanessa Parise	Zoanne Clack	October 24, 2024	2.17
Schmitt and Adams face a dangerous helicopter transport with a critically injured young girl, Ofelia, whose leg is at risk without immediate care. Schmitt's calm under pressure saves her, confirming his dedication to pediatric surgery—a career path Monica Beltran supports, even suggesting a clinical trial opportunity for him in Texas. Meanwhile, Jo Wilson, pregnant with twins, struggles with her anxieties, affecting her relationship with Link, who admits his own fears about parenthood. Bailey, Simone, and Kwan work tirelessly to secure costly gene therapy for Zayne, a hospital worker with severe sickle cell disease, though logistical barriers persist. Ndugu, invested in a lonely patient's recovery, finds commonality with new resident Ben Warren. Elsewhere, Teddy and Owen continue couples therapy to salvage their marriage, debating between temporary fixes and genuine resolutions. When a surgery unexpectedly showers them in blood, the shock brings laughter and a shared moment, highlighting their determination to mend their relationship.
436	6	"Night Moves"	Bille Woodruff	Jase Miles-Perez	November 7, 2024	2.04
The episode's central case involves a scaffolding accident at an air guitar concert, where a teenage couple is rushed to the ER with serious injuries. Schmitt, now acting as an attending for the night under Bailey's supervision, skillfully handles the complex trauma surgery, which includes a delicate decision to save a teen's kidney. Ultimately, Schmitt's positive experiences with younger patients solidify his decision to accept the pediatric clinical research position in Texas, despite offers to stay in Seattle as an attending. Meanwhile, Simone, who unintentionally confessed her love to Lucas, ultimately embraces her feelings, leading to a reciprocal declaration of love from Lucas. Mika and Jules work together on Winston's case, leading to Mika confessing that she wants to restart their relationship. After assisting on a lung transplant, Mika's fatigue, stemming from concern for her sister, reaches a critical point; she falls asleep behind the wheel with her sister in the car, causing a crash. Jo grapples with her fears of abandonment as her relationship with Link faces strain over her pregnancy, and she bonds with Amelia while taking care of their sick kids. Ultimately, although frustrated by her behavior, Link reassures Jo that he is in it for the long haul. Teddy finds herself in a complicated dynamic with new trauma surgeon Cass Beckman, whose marriage has recently opened up with non-monogamy, leading to a surprising kiss. Teddy tells Owen, who is upset by this development.
437	7	"If You Leave"	Allison Liddi-Brown	Tameson Duffy	November 14, 2024	2.13
Mika and her sister Chloe are gravely injured after their car accident. While still conscious, Mika instructs Lucas to take care of Chloe. Jules has a strong reaction to Mika's life being in danger, confusing the other interns. Simone comforts and reassures her after Jules admits her romantic entanglement with Mika. Grey Sloan assembles their best team of surgeons to save Mika and Chloe. After a successful operation, which included a spleen removal necessary to salvage her liver, Mika is temporarily in a coma so her body can recover, and her friends take turns sitting by her bedside. Chloe's crush injuries coupled with the chemotherapy she was receiving turn out to be too severe for her body to handle. When Mika wakes up, Bailey informs her that Chloe died, leaving her devastated. Meanwhile, in a bold move, Schmitt asks his boyfriend James to move to Texas with him. He says goodbye to Jo, who makes him her children's godfather, before he reminisces about his time at Grey Sloan. James meets Schmitt outside the hospital, announcing that he quit his job, and they walk off together.
438	8	"Drop It Like It's Hot"	Kevin McKidd	Jess Righthand	November 21, 2024	2.28
After six weeks of recovery, Mika returns to work at Grey Sloan, which brings up bad memories of her sister's passing. While working with Bailey, she has a nervous breakdown when a heatstroke patient codes. Jules meets her in an on-call room, and they have sex as Mika attempts to regain a sense of normalcy. Bailey convenes with Teddy and they decide to give Mika more time off. However, Mika has concluded that she needs to leave Grey Sloan, possibly permanently, and she says goodbye to Jules in the interns' locker room. Lucas and Jo fetch more ice to help with the heatwave plaguing the hospital, but the convenience store they're at gets held up at gunpoint by a robber. When Jo suspects she's suffering from vaginal bleeding, Lucas tries to disarm the gunman, and the gun goes off in the ensuing struggle. Owen works with Cass, the woman who kissed Teddy, making peace with her at first, but later, he feels threatened again when he sees Cass and Teddy alone in an elevator. He decides to reconnect with his old friend Nora, who'd been a recent patient, after randomly bumping into her. Kwan's ex-fiancé Molly returns to Seattle to see him after her boyfriend proposed; the two of them end up kissing. Despite pulling off an impossible surgery on a case of Marfan syndrome, Amelia and Winston's patient with whom they both have an emotional connection does not wake up.
439	9	"Hit the Floor"	Linda Klein	Jamie Denbo	March 6, 2025	2.24
The aftermath of the convenience store shooting brings chaos to Grey Sloan; Ben hits a wall with his new emergency preparedness plan; romantic tensions surface for Owen; Amelia and Winston disagree over the surgical plan for a young patient.
440	10	"Jump (for My Love)"	Jesse Williams	Julie Wong	March 13, 2025	1.96
Meredith and Nick return to Grey Sloan to treat a liver transplant patient. Meanwhile, Bailey hosts an intern retreat at her home, and Winston and Ben aid an unexpected crash victim.
441	11	"I Still Haven't Found What I'm Looking For"	Allison Liddi-Brown	Carol Brown	March 20, 2025	2.39
Following a difficult case, the team faces the complexities of medical ethics; Bailey continues to navigate her working relationship with Ben; a group of college students on a scavenger hunt causes chaos around the hospital.
442	12	"Ridin' Solo"	Kevin McKidd	Sandra Hamada	March 27, 2025	2.42
Meredith and Amelia prepare a funding proposal for their Alzheimer's research; Teddy and Owen hit a breaking point in their marriage; Jules has an awkward encounter with Dr. Beltran.
443	13	"Don't You (Forget About Me)"	Kim Raver	Julie Wong & Michelle Lirtzman	April 3, 2025	2.12
Amelia and Simone attempt to perform a high-stakes and groundbreaking brain surgery; Teddy and Bailey attend a medical conference and run into Dr. Cass Beckman; Jo struggles with her irritation toward a younger OB-GYN.
444	14	"Love in the Ice Age"	Morenike Joela Evans	Kingsley Ume	April 10, 2025	2.02
Bailey welcomes a renowned surgeon to the hospital. This surgeon is someone Bailey admires greatly, this new arrival influences Bailey and the rest of the team as they tackle a difficult medical case. Meanwhile, Teddy, Owen, Jules, and Ben come together to face a challenging situation. They must work quickly to save a patient who has been impaled by an ice pick. The team's collaboration will highlight their skills and teamwork under pressure.
445	15	"Bust Your Windows"	Lisa Leone	Scott D. Brown	April 17, 2025	1.88
A window washer's platform crashes through a hospital window, testing the Grey Sloan team's limits. Meanwhile, Blue and Simone clash over their living arrangements, and Lucas strives to impress Catherine while on her service.
446	16	"Papa Was a Rollin' Stone"	Chandra Wilson	Jess Righthand	May 1, 2025	2.04
Amelia undertakes a high-risk brain surgery on nine-year-old, Dylan Gatlin. While Winston and Jules disagree over how to handle their trauma patient's family, Jo and Link struggle with wedding planning.
447	17	"Love You Like a Love Song"	Kevin McKidd	Michelle Lirtzman & Julie Wong	May 8, 2025	2.04
Jo and Link's wedding day arrives, along with some visitors. Meanwhile, Teddy and Owen are met with a familiar face seeking treatment, and Lucas disagrees with Simone on how to approach a patient's worsened condition.
448	18	"How Do I Live"	Debbie Allen	Meg Marinis	May 15, 2025	2.28
While the interns are excited to transition to second-year residency, an ordinary day at Grey Sloan takes an unexpected turn when a medical emergency unfolds in the operating room, endangering lives inside the hospital.

== Cast and characters ==
=== Main ===
- Ellen Pompeo as Dr. Meredith Grey
- Chandra Wilson as Dr. Miranda Bailey
- James Pickens Jr. as Dr. Richard Webber
- Kevin McKidd as Dr. Owen Hunt
- Caterina Scorsone as Dr. Amelia Shepherd
- Camilla Luddington as Dr. Jo Wilson
- Jason George as Dr. Ben Warren
- Kim Raver as Dr. Teddy Altman
- Jake Borelli as Dr. Levi Schmitt
- Chris Carmack as Dr. Atticus "Link" Lincoln
- Anthony Hill as Dr. Winston Ndugu
- Alexis Floyd as Dr. Simone Griffith
- Harry Shum Jr. as Dr. Benson "Blue" Kwan
- Adelaide Kane as Dr. Jules Millin
- Midori Francis as Dr. Mika Yasuda
- Niko Terho as Dr. Lucas Adams

=== Recurring ===
- Debbie Allen as Dr. Catherine Fox
- Scott Speedman as Dr. Nick Marsh
- Natalie Morales as Dr. Monica Beltran
- Jaicy Elliot as Dr. Taryn Helm
- Floriana Lima as Nora Young
- Sophia Bush as Dr. Cass Beckman
- Dianne Doan as Molly Tran
- Michael Thomas Grant as Reverend James

=== Notable guests ===
- Jesse Williams as Dr. Jackson Avery
- Kali Rocha as Dr. Sydney Heron
- Julia Rose as Chloe Yasuda
- Troy Winbush as Darren Riley
- Leonard Wu as Eddie Huang
- Igby Rigney as Dr. Scott Marcus
- Lena Waithe as Dr. Evynn Moore
- Greg Germann as Dr. Tom Koracick
- Piper Perabo as Jenna Gatlin
- Trevor Jackson as Dr. Wes Bryant

== Production ==
=== Development ===
On April 2, 2024, ABC renewed the series for a twenty-first season with Meg Marinis returning as showrunner. On July 9, it was announced that the network had ordered 18 episodes for the season. It premiered in the United States on September 26, 2024. This was the last season to be produced by ABC Signature before being merged into 20th Television. The eighth episode of the season, "Drop It Like It's Hot", was the last episode to feature the "ABC Signature" logo.

=== Casting ===
Ahead of the twenty-first season, a number of long-term series regulars signed new contracts to return. Among these were two of three original cast members — Chandra Wilson and James Pickens Jr. — as well as others, including Kevin McKidd, Kim Raver, Caterina Scorsone, and Camilla Luddington. As a cost-cutting measure, the number of episodes each of these series regular is entitled to in their contract, was reduced. To further lower production costs, Jake Borelli who portrays Dr. Levi Schmitt and who joined the show in season 14, was announced to be departing the series. It was also reported that Midori Francis would be leaving the series after two years of portraying Dr. Mika Yasuda to pursue other opportunities. Both Borelli and Francis are set to appear in a limited number of episodes to provide closure to their characters storylines. Series regulars Chandra Wilson and James Pickens Jr. were also promoted to co-executive producers.

After starring in a reduced capacity across the previous two seasons, Ellen Pompeo is expected to increase her appearances, appearing in at least seven, but up to a maximum of fourteen, of the seasons episodes as the titular character, Dr. Meredith Grey. Former series regular Scott Speedman is also set to see an increased presence in the season as Grey's love interest, Dr. Nick Marsh. He guest stars in at least five episodes. Speedman was part of the main cast for the eighteenth and nineteenth seasons, but was demoted to the recurring cast ahead of the previous season. Following the conclusion of spin-off series Station 19, Jason George returned to Grey's Anatomy as a series regular to portray Dr. Ben Warren. George first appeared in the series in season 6 and was promoted to the main cast in season 12. He then left in season 14 to join Station 19 ensemble cast, where he remained for the entirety of that program's run. During this time, George continued to recur on Grey's Anatomy.

Michael Thomas Grant was cast in a recurring role to portray an openly gay chaplain. Kali Rocha also reprised her role in three episodes as Dr. Sydney Heron, after a 17-year absence in the series. Rocha originally recurred in eight episodes of the series across the second, third, and fourth seasons.

=== Filming ===
On January 8, 2025, it was announced that production was temporarily suspended due to the ongoing wildfires in the Southern California region, where the show is filmed.

== Reception ==
=== Ratings ===
Viewership and ratings per episode of Grey's Anatomy season 21
No.	Title	Air date	Timeslot (ET)	Rating/share (18–49)	Viewers (millions)	DVR (18–49)	DVR viewers (millions)	Total (18–49)	Total viewers (millions)	Ref.
1	"If Walls Could Talk"	September 26, 2024	Thursday; 10:00 p.m.	0.3/3	2.70	—N/a	—N/a	—N/a	—N/a	
2	"Take Me to Church"	October 3, 2024	Thursday; 10:00 p.m.	0.3/3	2.50	—N/a	—N/a	—N/a	—N/a	
3	"I Can See Clearly Now"	October 10, 2024	Thursday; 10:00 p.m.	0.2/3	2.36	—N/a	—N/a	—N/a	—N/a	
4	"This One's for the Girls"	October 17, 2024	Thursday; 10:00 p.m.	0.2/3	2.04	0.3	1.75	0.5	3.78	
5	"You Make My Heart Explode"	October 24, 2024	Thursday; 10:00 p.m.	0.2/3	2.17	0.2	1.71	0.4	3.88	
6	"Night Moves"	November 7, 2024	Thursday; 10:00 p.m.	0.2/2	2.04	0.3	1.77	0.5	3.81	
7	"If You Leave"	November 14, 2024	Thursday; 10:00 p.m.	0.2/2	2.13	0.3	1.82	0.5	3.95	
8	"Drop It Like It's Hot"	November 21, 2024	Thursday; 10:00 p.m.	0.2/2	2.28	0.2	1.68	0.4	3.98	
9	"Hit the Floor"	March 6, 2025	Thursday; 10:00 p.m.	0.3/4	2.24	0.3	1.71	0.5	3.96	
10	"Jump (for My Love)"	March 13, 2025	Thursday; 10:00 p.m.	0.2/3	1.96	0.2	1.72	0.4	3.68	
11	"I Still Haven't Found What I'm Looking For"	March 20, 2025	Thursday; 10:00 p.m.	0.2/3	2.39	0.3	1.77	0.5	4.16	
12	"Ridin' Solo"	March 27, 2025	Thursday; 10:00 p.m.	0.2/3	2.42	0.2	1.59	0.4	4.01	
13	"Don't You (Forget About Me)"	April 3, 2025	Thursday; 10:00 p.m.	0.2/3	2.12	0.2	1.72	0.4	3.84	
14	"Love in the Ice Age"	April 10, 2025	Thursday; 10:00 p.m.	0.2/4	2.02	0.2	1.73	0.4	3.74	
15	"Bust Your Windows"	April 17, 2025	Thursday; 10:00 p.m.	0.2/4	1.88	0.2	1.70	0.5	3.58	
16	"Papa Was a Rollin' Stone"	May 1, 2025	Thursday; 10:00 p.m.	0.2/3	2.04	0.2	1.68	0.4	3.71	
17	"Love You Like a Love Song"	May 8, 2025	Thursday; 10:00 p.m.	0.2/3	2.04	0.1	1.59	0.4	3.62	
18	"How Do I Live"	May 15, 2025	Thursday; 10:00 p.m.	0.2/3	2.28	—N/a	—N/a	—N/a	—N/a	
