= Grey's Anatomy season 20 =

Grey's Anatomy
- Season 20
- Promotional poster for the twentieth season of Grey's Anatomy
- Showrunner: Meg Marinis
- Starring: Ellen Pompeo; Chandra Wilson; James Pickens Jr.; Kevin McKidd; Caterina Scorsone; Camilla Luddington; Kim Raver; Jake Borelli; Chris Carmack; Anthony Hill; Alexis Floyd; Harry Shum Jr.; Adelaide Kane; Midori Francis; Niko Terho
- No. of episodes: 10

Release
- Original network: ABC
- Original release: March 14 – May 30, 2024

Season chronology
- ← Previous; Season 19 Next → Season 21

The twentieth season of the American medical drama television series Grey's Anatomy was announced on March 24, 2023, and premiered in the United States on the American Broadcasting Company (ABC) on March 14, 2024. Meg Marinis took over as showrunner after Krista Vernoff, who departed from the series after the previous season.

This is the first season not to feature Jesse Williams since the sixth season and the first season not to feature Kelly McCreary and Scott Speedman as series regulars since the eleventh and eighteenth seasons, respectively. Ellen Pompeo retained her series regular status, while also continuing to provide voiceover for every episode and appearing in five episodes of the season. On April 2, 2024, ABC renewed the series for a twenty-first season.

== Episodes ==
No. overall	No. in season	Title	Directed by	Written by	Original release date	U.S. viewers (millions)
421	1	"We've Only Just Begun"	Kevin McKidd	Meg Marinis	March 14, 2024	3.62
Chaos is rampant as the aftermath of the previous season's dramatic events unfolds. Nick reprimands the interns for their actions. Amidst all this, Meredith and Bailey team up to guide the interns through a life-or-death situation involving a self-driving car and a crashed ambulance, while Lucas and Simone work on a patient. Meredith is caught in the middle of hospital politics and faces backlash for her Alzheimer's theories. Catherine threatens to fire her if Meredith does not retract her claims. However, Meredith secretly instructs Amelia to continue her research, after which Nick and Meredith depart for Boston. Ultimately, Bailey takes on a new role as the chief of the Residency Program to whip the interns into shape. Additionally, Teddy's life is saved by Ndugu in the OR, and Link and Jo face guilt after Sam died last season.
422	2	"Keep the Family Close"	Allison Liddi-Brown	Briana Belser & Jess Righthand	March 21, 2024	3.50
Dr. Bailey takes control of the interns and emphasizes the importance of discipline and professionalism. This causes a conflict with Dr. Ndugu regarding surgical protocols, leading to tensions in the operating room. Meanwhile, Teddy struggles with guilt and recovery after using Yasuda to check on her patients, which raises concerns from her husband, Owen. During a family softball game, a medical crisis occurs, and Amelia identifies a spinal injury in a pregnant patient. The doctors perform a complex surgery to save both the mother and baby, and they are ultimately successful. Amelia confesses to Ndugu that she feels lonely and invites him to dinner. Simone faces difficulties with a patient's diagnosis, causing her to reflect on her choices and career priorities. Her relationship with Lucas takes a turn as they confront difficult truths, and both Simone and Lucas pull away from each other. Link and Jo reminisce about their long history, and Amelia reveals to Jo that she has figured out that the two of them are dating.
423	3	"Walk on the Ocean"	Debbie Allen	Mark Driscoll & Beto Skubs	March 28, 2024	3.26
Meredith and Amelia are struggling to secure funding for their research due to their connection with the Fox Foundation. During physical therapy, Meredith discloses the funding challenge to Teddy. Teddy offers to fund their research confidentially to prevent the Fox Foundation from finding out. Personal issues between the staff spill over into the professional setting: Lucas is upset about his recent breakup; Amelia and new surgeon Dr. Monica Beltran disagree on a treatment plan; and Levi runs into his ex, Nico, who is planning to have a child with his current partner. Amelia and Monica disagree on the treatment of a patient until Amelia finds a safer approach, which earns her praise from Monica. Lucas's unprofessional behavior causes friction, leading Mika to end their friendship. Levi's encounter with Nico prompts him to apply for a pediatrics fellowship. Winston faces relationship doubts after Maggie cancels plans for him to visit Chicago multiple times, prompting him to remove his wedding band.
424	4	"Baby Can I Hold You"	Morenike Joela Evans	Jase Miles-Perez	April 4, 2024	3.23
Arizona Robbins returns to Grey Sloan Memorial Hospital to work with Miranda Bailey and Jo Wilson. Their focus is on a pregnant patient, Vida, whose unborn baby has a brain abnormality. The team plans a groundbreaking surgery before delivery to fix this issue. However, things get complicated when Vida hesitates, fearing for her baby's safety. Bailey is unaware of the experimental nature of the surgery and dismisses Robbins. Robbins persists after the baby's father pleads for help. Eventually, Robbins involves Vida in the decision-making process, and she consents to the surgery. Jules Millin, whose wellness influencer brother is mistaken for a doctor, tackles a medical challenge with Owen's help. Teddy Altman faces hurdles as she strives to return to surgery. She proves her skills in a rigorous evaluation under Webber and ultimately gets cleared to return to work. The interns learn valuable lessons about accountability and collaboration under Bailey's guidance and interrogation from lawyers. Bailey confronts the interns about their past mistakes to instill new rules for teamwork and accountability, stating that no intern will join a surgery until they all prove themselves collectively to her. Simone tells the lawyers that she would not have cut without Lucas there, alienating him.
425	5	"Never Felt So Alone"	Debbie Allen	Tameson Duffy & Kingsley Ume	April 11, 2024	3.25
At a White Coat party, a deck collapse causes injuries to several medical students. Bailey takes charge of the hospital's response while interns rush to provide assistance. Meanwhile, Simone and Blue search for a missing student, Eddie, and find him on a rooftop ledge contemplating suicide. They both manage to connect with him and convince him to step back from the edge. After that stressful patient experience, Simone invites Lucas to lay beside her in the on-call room to relieve some tension. Meredith faces a family emergency when her son, Bailey, is hospitalized in Boston without her consent. She initially coldly dismisses Nick, but later explains that she is the only one the kids have since Derek died. Nick reminds her that he is there for her and that she has a whole support system. Jo experiences a pregnancy scare, prompting her and Link to reflect on their future and blended family dynamics. Despite initial tension, they reaffirm their commitment to each other. Yasuda questions Helm's commitment to her as a dating partner after she blocks Yasuda from joining a surgery.
426	6	"The Marathon Continues"	Amyn Kaderali	Sandra Hamada	May 2, 2024	2.92
Mika and Teddy receive a patient from a nearby penitentiary. Catherine pushes back on Link and Monica's treatment plan for a VIP. Bailey tries to integrate wellness into the residency program.
427	7	"She Used to Be Mine"	Debbie Allen	Scott D. Brown & Jamie Denbo	May 9, 2024	3.07
An unexpectedly complex case brings back painful memories for Simone. Jules and Blue make a high-stakes bet on who can finish their procedure log first. Richard suspects Winston is avoiding him.
428	8	"Blood, Sweat and Tears"	Chandra Wilson	Megan Chan Meinero	May 16, 2024	2.75
Owen and Teddy have the day off but encounter an injured civilian. Monica enlists Amelia's help with an operation on a young patient. The interns complete their procedure logs, allowing them back into the OR.
429	9	"I Carry Your Heart"	Kevin McKidd	Michelle Lirtzman	May 23, 2024	3.02
Just as Amelia comes to a realization, Teddy encourages her and Meredith to speed up their Alzheimer's research over fear of Catherine finding out. Mika finds herself caught in the middle of Link and Jo. Meanwhile, Lucas receives bad news.
430	10	"Burn It Down"	Debbie Allen	Julie Wong	May 30, 2024	3.48
Meredith is hopeful that the findings from the Alzheimer research project can be leveraged to persuade Catherine into letting them continue, but Catherine issues an ultimatum instead: Meredith and Amelia will hand over all their work to Tom Koracic and cease their involvement, and Meredith, Amelia, and Teddy can keep their jobs. Despite being fired, Teddy returns to Grey Sloan to assist with the surgery of Station 19 firefighter Theo Ruiz, with Owen supporting her to defy Catherine's authority. Bailey worries about her firefighter husband Ben Warren. Jo discovers that she is pregnant, complicating her relationship with Link. Kwan is shaken by an asthma patient who has memory loss after an old car accident; he reluctantly reveals to Lucas the woman is his ex-fiancee. Richard leads Yasuda and Millin during a surgical procedure, but fails to notice an issue that results in complications that cause the patient's death, forcing him to accept it may be time for him to finally retire from surgery. In response to Catherine's ultimatum, Meredith resigns from the Fox Foundation and instead publishes the research publicly, valuing its potential to save lives over hospital politics, and departs Grey Sloan while discussing a future together with Nick. In retaliation, Catherine fires Amelia, Teddy, and Owen. Simone worries that Lucas will accept Maggie Pierce's offer for a second year residency in Chicago, and rallies the first year residents together to support Lucas as Catherine decides on whether he will be forced to repeat his intern year for his role in Sam Sutton's death. When Catherine threatens to replace them all, Bailey appears, challenging Catherine to replace her as well. Note: This episode continues a crossover event that begins on Station 19 season 7 episode 9 and concludes on Station 19 season 7 episode 10.

== Cast and characters ==
=== Main ===
- Ellen Pompeo as Dr. Meredith Grey
- Chandra Wilson as Dr. Miranda Bailey
- James Pickens Jr. as Dr. Richard Webber
- Kevin McKidd as Dr. Owen Hunt
- Caterina Scorsone as Dr. Amelia Shepherd
- Camilla Luddington as Dr. Jo Wilson
- Kim Raver as Dr. Teddy Altman
- Jake Borelli as Dr. Levi Schmitt
- Chris Carmack as Dr. Atticus Lincoln
- Anthony Hill as Dr. Winston Ndugu
- Alexis Floyd as Dr. Simone Griffith
- Harry Shum Jr. as Dr. Benson "Blue" Kwan
- Adelaide Kane as Dr. Jules Millin
- Midori Francis as Dr. Mika Yasuda
- Niko Terho as Dr. Lucas Adams

=== Recurring ===
- Debbie Allen as Dr. Catherine Fox
- Jason George as Dr. Ben Warren
- Scott Speedman as Dr. Nick Marsh
- Natalie Morales as Dr. Monica Beltran
- Jaicy Elliot as Dr. Taryn Helm
- Freddy Miyares as Dorian Cardenas
- Jacqueline Obradors as Valeria Cardenas

=== Notable guests ===
- Jessica Capshaw as Dr. Arizona Robbins
- Kelly McCreary as Dr. Maggie Pierce
- Juliet Mills as Maxine Anderson
- Bianca Comparato as Maria-Flor Vasconcellos
- Merrick McCartha as Karl
- Alex Landi as Dr. Nico Kim
- Raymond Cruz as Daniel Jiménez
- Marla Gibbs as Joyce Ward
- Stefania Spampinato as Dr. Carina DeLuca
- Carlos Miranda as Theo Ruiz
- Dianne Doan as Molly Tran

== Production ==
=== Development ===
On March 24, 2023, ABC renewed the show for a milestone twentieth season to premiere during the 2023-24 television season.

On January 25, 2023, ahead of the official Season 20 renewal, Krista Vernoff announced her departure as showrunner from Grey's Anatomy and its spin-off series Station 19, however, she will still be attached to the show as an executive producer and through her company Trip the Light Productions. Two months later, on the day the series was renewed, Meg Marinis was announced to take the role as showrunner after Vernoff's departure. Marinis has been working on the show since the third season as a writer's production assistant, and was promoted to executive producer on the fifteenth season; she has written more than 25 episodes of the series to date.

The production of the season was delayed due to the WGA and SAG-AFTRA strikes in the United States. Due to this, the season had a short run of 10 episodes, the shortest since the first season, which ran for 9 episodes.

On November 15, 2023, the first table read for the season premiere took place, as shared by actors Camilla Luddington, Midori Francis, Adelaide Kane, Anthony Hill and James Pickens, Jr. through Instagram stories. Filming for the season began a couple of days later.

=== Casting ===
On May 18, 2023, hours before the premiere of the previous season finale, it was announced the return of the two remaining original castmates Chandra Wilson and James Pickens, Jr. portraying their characters Dr. Miranda Bailey and Dr. Richard Webber, respectively; as well as the return of long-time cast members Kevin McKidd, Kim Raver, Camilla Luddington and Caterina Scorsone to portray Dr. Owen Hunt, Dr. Teddy Altman, Dr. Jo Wilson and Dr. Amelia Shepherd, respectively. Wilson and Pickens, Jr. had been on the series since its inception, while McKidd, Luddington, Scorsone, and Raver had been starring on the series since the fifth, tenth, eleventh and fifteenth seasons, respectively, additionally, Scorsone first portrayed her character on the Grey's spin-off series Private Practice from 2010 to 2013 and Raver was also a main cast member during Grey's' early years, from 2010 to 2012, before re-joining the cast on 2018.

This was the first season not to feature Kelly McCreary as a series regular since the eleventh season; she played Dr. Maggie Pierce who first appeared on the series at the final episodes of the tenth season and started starring mid-way through the eleventh season. She however, makes an appearance during the ninth episode of the season.

Additionally, series star Ellen Pompeo, who portrays the series' protagonist, Dr. Meredith Grey, did not return as a series regular. However, she appeared in 5 of the 10 episodes of the season and will continue to narrate the episodes and serve as one of the executive producers of the show. Pompeo retained her series regular status throughout the season.

Other cast members who reecured throughout the season include Debbie Allen, Jaicy Elliot, and Scott Speedman as Drs. Catherine Fox, Taryn Helm & Nick Marsh, respectively. Speedman joined the main cast in season 18 and remained credited as "starring" through most of season 19. However, he was demoted to recurring status.

On February 10, 2024, it was announced the return of Jessica Capshaw and Alex Landi to portray their characters Dr. Arizona Robbins and Dr. Nico Kim, respectively as guest stars. Capshaw starred on the show from 2009 to 2018 and was last seen on the fourteenth's season finale "All of Me", while Landi made recurring appearances on the show from 2018 to 2022. The character of Arizona returned in the fourth episode of the season to premiere on April 4, 2024. Natalie Morales and Freddy Miyares were cast as guest stars, Morales played pediatric surgeon Monica Beltran, while Miyares played Dorian, a patient who was involved in a serious accident.

== Reception ==
=== Ratings ===
Viewership and ratings per episode of Grey's Anatomy season 20
No.	Title	Air date	Timeslot (ET)	Rating/share (18–49)	Viewers (millions)	DVR (18–49)	DVR viewers (millions)	Total (18–49)	Total viewers (millions)
1	"We've Only Just Begun"	March 14, 2024	Thursday; 9:00 p.m.	0.6/6	3.62	0.3	1.87	0.9	5.49
2	"Keep the Family Close"	March 21, 2024	Thursday; 9:00 p.m.	0.5/5	3.50	0.3	1.72	0.8	5.26
3	"Walk on the Ocean"	March 28, 2024	Thursday; 9:00 p.m.	0.4/4	3.26	—N/a	—N/a	—N/a	—N/a
4	"Baby Can I Hold You"	April 4, 2024	Thursday; 9:00 p.m.	0.5/5	3.23	—N/a	—N/a	—N/a	—N/a
5	"Never Felt So Alone"	April 11, 2024	Thursday; 9:00 p.m.	0.5/6	3.25	—N/a	—N/a	—N/a	—N/a
6	"The Marathon Continues"	May 2, 2024	Thursday; 9:00 p.m.	0.4/4	2.92	—N/a	—N/a	—N/a	—N/a
7	"She Used to Be Mine"	May 9, 2024	Thursday; 9:00 p.m.	0.4/4	3.07	—N/a	—N/a	—N/a	—N/a
8	"Blood, Sweat and Tears"	May 16, 2024	Thursday; 9:00 p.m.	0.4/4	2.75	—N/a	—N/a	—N/a	—N/a
9	"I Carry Your Heart"	May 23, 2024	Thursday; 9:00 p.m.	0.4/4	3.02	—N/a	—N/a	—N/a	—N/a
10	"Burn It Down"	May 30, 2024	Thursday; 9:00 p.m.	0.4/5	3.48	—N/a	—N/a	—N/a	—N/a
