= Alexis Floyd =

American actress, dancer and singer

- Born: Cleveland, Ohio, U.S.
- Education: Carnegie Mellon University (BFA)
- Occupation: Actress
- Years active: 2017–present

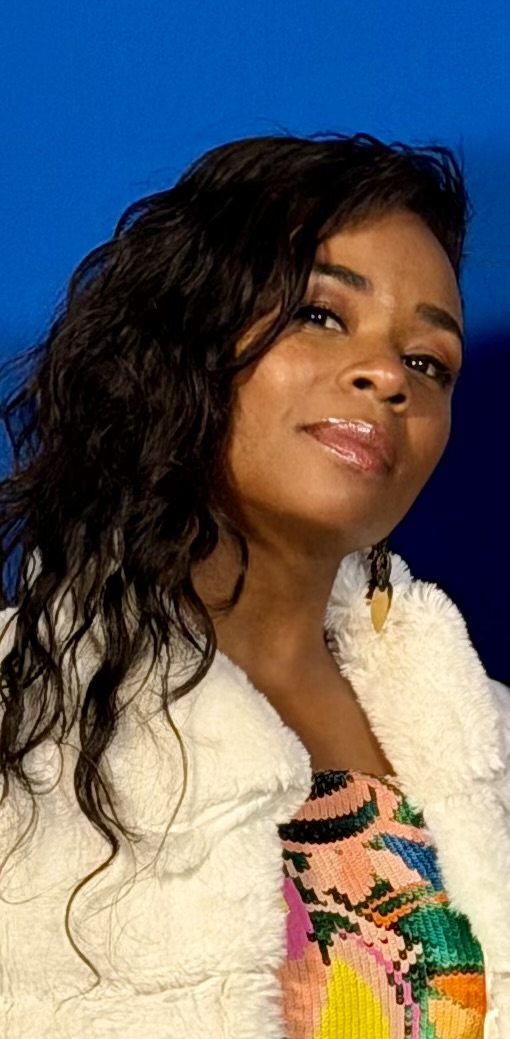
Alexis Floyd in 2025

Alexis Floyd is an American actress best known for her portrayal of Neff in the Netflix series Inventing Anna (2022) and Dr. Simone Griffith on Grey's Anatomy (2022–present).

== Early years and education ==
Alexis Floyd was born and raised in Cleveland, Ohio, in a musical family. Her mother, a classically trained flautist, is manager of Cleveland Youth Orchestra and her father was a classically trained tenor before becoming a lawyer. She took up violin at age three. She was a competitive figure skater, did violin recitals at the Youth Orchestra, studied at the Cleveland School of Ballet and did musical theater at several venues, including Cleveland Playhouse and Cleveland Public Theater. Her education was entirely in private schools. For high school she attended Hawken School, and went on to Carnegie Mellon to study musical theater. In 2012, she studied at The Rhodopi International Theater Collective in Bulgaria, where she studied Suzuki method, mime, and aerial art. After college graduation she moved to Los Angeles and then to New York City where she now lives. At the time of her audition for the role of Neff, Floyd was working as a concierge at a New York high-end yoga studio.

== Career ==
Her career prior to her role as Neff was primarily off-Broadway and a recurring role as Tia Clayton in Freeform's The Bold Type. Her other activities included choreography and dancing on short films and music videos.

Her career took a leap forward when she landed the role of Neff in Inventing Anna. The series is the true life story of Anna Sorokin, a Russian born woman who claimed to be Anna Delvey, a German heiress who faked her way into New York high society. She did much preparation before auditioning. "A bit of a social media recluse," Floyd was unaware of the Sorokin/Delvey story; to learn about it she read as much as she could. Floyd learned the Prince George's County accent of Neff, with some New York thrown in. When Floyd got the role she met the "real Neff," Neffatari (Neff) Davis. They met several times, so that Floyd would have some understanding of the dynamics of the friendship between Neff and Anna. Floyd's role was as a concierge at a boutique hotel Delvey was staying in. The concierge became crucial to Anna, and her only friend. Neff was the key to getting Anna V–VIP access to exclusive parties, shopping services and restaurants. Floyd's portrayal of Neff has been critically well received. Her performance has been described as a "scene stealer and truly magnetic." Floyd felt she could easily relate to Neff Davis; they live down the street from each other in Brooklyn, and:

We both worked front-desk jobs. We're both struggling to keep the balls in the air of tending the flame of your art but also keeping food on the table. There were a lot of stars aligning between the two of us.

On July 19, 2022, it was announced that Floyd will be a series regular during the 19th season of the ABC series, Grey's Anatomy.

== Personal ==
Floyd has a younger brother, Aric Floyd, who is also an actor.

Floyd publicly came out as queer in 2025.

== Filmography ==
| Year | Title | Role | Notes |
|---|---|---|---|
| 2017 | Newly Single | Theater Performer | Film |
| 2019 | The Bold Type | Tia Clayton | 8 episodes |
| 2021 | Dickinson | Proposal Friend #5 | Episode: "The Daisy Follows Soft the Sun" |
| 2022 | Way Down | Sherrie | 2 episodes |
| 2022 | Inventing Anna | Neff | 9 episodes |
| 2022-present | Grey's Anatomy | Dr. Simone Griffith | 66 episodes |
| 2023 | The Good Fight | Deandra Minton | Episode: "The End of the Yips" |
