= Grey's Anatomy =

American television series (2005–present)

- Genre: Medical drama; Romantic drama
- Created by: Shonda Rhimes
- Showrunners: Shonda Rhimes; James Parriott; Krista Vernoff; Mark Wilding; Joan Rater; Tony Phelan; William Harper; Stacy McKee; Meg Marinis
- Starring: Ellen Pompeo
- Narrated by: Ellen Pompeo and various others
- Theme music composer: Psapp
- Opening theme: "Cosy in the Rocket" (seasons 1–3, 7, 14)
- Ending theme: "Cosy in the Rocket" (instrumental)
- Composer: Danny Lux
- Country of origin: United States
- Original language: English
- No. of seasons: 23
- No. of episodes: 472 (list of episodes)

Production
- Executive producers: Shonda Rhimes; Ellen Pompeo; Allan Heinberg; Andy Reaser; Betsy Beers; Debbie Allen; James D. Parriott; Jeannine Renshaw; Jeff Rafner; Joan Rater; Kent Hodder; Krista Vernoff; Mark Gordon; Mark Wilding; Marti Noxon; Meg Marinis; Peter Horton; Rob Corn; Stacy McKee; Steve Mulholland; Tony Phelan; William Harper; Zoanne Clack; Olivier Dumont
- Producers: Ann Kindberg; Austin Guzman; Elisabeth R. Finch; Gabrielle G. Stanton; Harry Werksman; James E. Williams; Jeff Rafner; Linda Klein; Lisa Taylor; Mark Foreman; Meg Marinis; Michael Metzner; Mimi Schmir; Peter Nowalk; Sara E. White; Stacy McKee; Tammy Ann Casper; Tia Napolitano; William Harper; Zoanne Clack
- Cinematography: Herbert Davis; Tim Suhrstedt; Jeffrey Jur (pilot only)
- Editors: Susan Vaill; David Greenspan; Edward Ornelas; Justin Chinn; Briana London; Sarah Boyd; Stacy Katzman; Brandi Bradburn; Bjorn Myrholt
- Camera setup: Single-camera
- Running time: 40–52 minutes
- Production companies: Shondaland; Trip the Light (seasons 18–19); MMTV (season 20–present); Lionsgate Television (Note: Credited as The Mark Gordon Company in seasons 1–15 and Entertainment One in seasons 15–19); 20th Television (Note: Credited as Touchstone Television in seasons 1–4, ABC Studios in seasons 4–16 and ABC Signature in seasons 17–21)

Original release
- Network: ABC
- Release: March 27, 2005 – present

Related
- Private Practice; Station 19; A corazón abierto (Colombian TV series); A corazón abierto (Mexican TV series)

Grey's Anatomy is an American medical drama television series focusing on the personal and professional lives of surgical interns, residents, and attendings at the fictional Seattle Grace Hospital (later renamed Seattle Grace Mercy West Hospital, and currently Grey Sloan Memorial Hospital). The series premiered on March 27, 2005, on ABC as a mid-season replacement and has been renewed annually for two decades. Its title is a mixture of the protagonist's surname and the name of the classic human anatomy textbook Gray's Anatomy. Writer Shonda Rhimes developed the pilot and served as showrunner, head writer, and executive producer until stepping down in 2015. Set in Seattle, Washington, the series is filmed primarily in Los Angeles, California.

The original cast consisted of nine star-billed actors: Ellen Pompeo, Sandra Oh, Katherine Heigl, Justin Chambers, T. R. Knight, Chandra Wilson, James Pickens Jr., Isaiah Washington, and Patrick Dempsey. For most of its run, the series revolves around Dr. Meredith Grey (Pompeo), chronicling her progression from surgical intern to fully-qualified doctor. The cast has undergone major changes throughout the series' run, with only three original members remaining by the 19th season – Pompeo, Wilson, and Pickens. Pompeo stepped back from the series in its 19th season, at which point the show shifted to more of an ensemble format. In March 2026, ABC renewed the series for a 23rd season, which is set to premiere in the fall of 2026. Grey's Anatomy has two spin-off series: Private Practice (2007–2013) and Station 19 (2018–2024); as well as a web series, Grey's Anatomy: B-Team.

Grey's Anatomy is the longest-running scripted primetime show currently airing on ABC, and the longest scripted primetime series carried by ABC. The series brought many series regulars, including Pompeo, Oh, and Dempsey, to worldwide recognition; they were among the five highest-earning television actors in 2013. Once among the overall top 10 shows in the United States, the show's ratings have fallen, although as of 2017 it was still one of the highest-rated shows among the 18–49 demographic. As of February 2023, Grey's Anatomy was ranked the 10th most popular on-demand program.

Grey's Anatomy has been well received by critics throughout much of its run and has been included in various critics' year-end top 10 lists. Cosmopolitan and Entertainment Weekly have listed it as one of the greatest television series of all time. Since its inception, the show has been described by the media outlets as a television "phenomenon" or a "juggernaut", owing to its longevity and dominant ratings. It is considered to have had a significant effect on popular culture and has received numerous awards, including the Golden Globe Award for Best Television Series – Drama and a total of 38 Primetime Emmy Award nominations, including 2 for Outstanding Drama Series. The cast members have also received accolades for their individual performances.

== Plot ==
The series follows the life of Meredith Grey (Ellen Pompeo), the daughter of world renowned general surgeon Ellis Grey (Kate Burton), starting from her acceptance into the surgical residency program at the fictional Seattle Grace Hospital (later named Seattle Grace Mercy West, and finally, Grey Sloan Memorial Hospital). During her time as an intern, Grey works alongside fellow physicians Cristina Yang (Sandra Oh), Izzie Stevens (Katherine Heigl), Alex Karev (Justin Chambers) and George O'Malley (T. R. Knight), who each struggle to balance their personal lives with hectic schedules and stressful residency requirements. During their internship, they are overseen by Miranda Bailey (Chandra Wilson), a senior resident, who works with attending physicians Derek Shepherd (Patrick Dempsey), head of neurosurgery and Meredith's love interest, and Preston Burke (Isaiah Washington), head of cardiothoracic surgery and Yang's eventual fiancé. Richard Webber (James Pickens Jr.), Chief of Surgery and attending general surgeon, is the former lover of Ellis Grey. During the first six seasons, Burke, O'Malley, and Stevens all depart the series.

In addition to Webber, Burke, and Shepherd, the surgical wing is primarily supervised by Addison Montgomery (Kate Walsh), Shepherd's ex-wife and the head of OB/GYN, neonatal and fetal surgery who leaves for Los Angeles at the end of Season 3; Mark Sloan (Eric Dane), head of plastic surgery and also certified in ENT surgery; Callie Torres (Sara Ramirez), a resident who later becomes head of orthopedic surgery and leaves Seattle for New York at the end of Season 12; Erica Hahn (Brooke Smith), as head of cardiothoracic surgery and Burke's replacement, who leaves Seattle Grace in Season 5 after a disagreement with Torres; Owen Hunt (Kevin McKidd), as head of trauma surgery who later marries and divorces Yang; Arizona Robbins (Jessica Capshaw), as head of pediatric surgery, and later head of maternal/fetal surgery who marries Torres; Teddy Altman (Kim Raver), as head of cardiothoracic surgery who departs at the end of Season 8 but returns in Season 14, later marrying Hunt; and Amelia Shepherd (Caterina Scorsone), Derek's sister, who is hired to replace him as head of neurosurgery.

Lexie Grey (Chyler Leigh), Meredith's paternal half-sister, joins the residency program in season 4 until her death with her love interest Sloan in a plane crash at the end of Season 8, after which Seattle Grace is renamed Grey Sloan Memorial Hospital in their memory. Former Mercy West residents April Kepner (Sarah Drew) and Jackson Avery (Jesse Williams) join Seattle Grace following a hospital merger in Season 6. Other additions include Leah Murphy (Tessa Ferrer), who departs at the end of Season 10 but returns during Season 13; Shane Ross (Gaius Charles), who leaves with Yang to work in Zürich, Switzerland, in the Season 10 finale; Stephanie Edwards (Jerrika Hinton), who resigns at the end of Season 13; Jo Wilson (Camilla Luddington), who has a tumultuous romantic relationship with Karev; Andrew DeLuca (Giacomo Gianniotti), the former love interest of Meredith's maternal half-sister Maggie Pierce (Kelly McCreary) who also served as head of cardiothoracic surgery; and Ben Warren (Jason George), an anesthesiologist-turned resident-turned firefighter who marries Bailey.

Season 11 sees the death of Derek Shepherd. In Season 12, attending cardiovascular surgeon Nathan Riggs (Martin Henderson) joins the show, and later briefly becomes Meredith's love interest. In the early episodes of Season 14, Tom Koracick (Greg Germann), an attending neurosurgeon, begins making appearances and Riggs leaves the series to start a life with Owen's long-lost sister Megan (Abigail Spencer); by the season finale, Robbins, Kepner and Warren also depart the show, with Warren joining the fire department featured on Station 19 before returning after the end of that series.

Midway through Season 16, Cormac Hayes (Richard Flood) becomes the new chief of pediatric surgery as Karev departs to reunite with Stevens. During Season 17, DeLuca is stabbed while chasing a child abductor/human trafficker and despite the efforts of Hunt and Altman, he dies. Avery and Koracick also depart in Season 17, with Avery moving to Boston to take over his family's charitable foundation and Koracick leaving to assist him. In Season 18, Hayes moves back to Ireland, Hunt and Altman flee the country, transplant surgeon Nick Marsh (Scott Speedman), a patient of Meredith's turned love interest, returns to Minnesota, and Bailey resigns as Chief of Surgery, leaving Meredith to take over the role.

In Season 19, new interns Simone Griffith (Alexis Floyd), Benson "Blue" Kwan (Harry Shum Jr.), Jules Millin (Adelaide Kane), Mika Yasuda (Midori Francis) and Lucas Adams (Niko Terho), Derek and Amelia's nephew, join the program; Meredith moves to Boston, reducing her role at Grey Sloan while she works on a cure for Alzheimer's disease, and Pierce departs to further her own career in Chicago. In Season 20, Marsh resigns from his role as Residency Director and moves to Boston with Meredith, leaving Bailey to be the new Residency Director. After a traumatic car accident in Season 21, Yasuda departs from the program. The rest of her class become residents with their own interns to teach in Season 22, including Griffith's one-night stand Wes Bryant (Trevor Jackson).

== Series synopsis ==
Title card

Grey's Anatomy chronicles the lives of surgical interns, residents, and attendings at the fictional Grey Sloan Memorial Hospital (formerly Seattle Grace Hospital, Season 1–6; Seattle Grace Mercy West Hospital, Season 6–9; and then Grey Sloan Memorial Hospital, Season 9–present), as the interns progressively evolve into seasoned doctors under the guidance of their residents, attendings, and the chief of surgery.

Each episode usually opens with a voice-over narration from Meredith Grey or another season regular, often foreshadowing the episode's theme. Most seasons typically mirror the physicians' academic year, with each completed year elevating the residents to a higher level in the surgical field. The season finale often culminates in a dramatic event, such as a character's death or departure.

The series focuses on the doctors' professional lives as surgeons, but also gives significant attention to their personal lives. Character development and relationships frequently take precedence over medical ethics concerns. While the physicians perform intricate surgeries and treat their patients' illnesses, they also exhibit a competitive drive and seek recognition.

Upon arrival at the hospital each morning, residents may compete over who gets assigned a challenging case, often generating tension. A hospital superior typically assigns cases, further intensifying the dynamic between residents and their superiors. Episodes shift between the doctors' interactions with patients and their personal dynamics with colleagues. Once assigned a case, each doctor works to diagnose the patient, typically with the support of an attending physician, which usually results in surgery. Each episode typically features scenes of a surgery towards the center of the episode.

The show often portrays the doctors forming personal connections with their patients, with many cases indirectly reflecting the doctors' own personal struggles. One notable instance is Izzie Stevens' entanglement with her patient, Denny Duquette, in Season 2. Relationships between the doctors, whether romantic or platonic, frequently develop and create conflicts between their personal and professional lives.

Emotional moments are often underscored by an indie rock soundtrack, with "songtages" – tracks that run through a montage of scenes, connecting storylines with poignant lyrics – becoming a hallmark of the series. Each episode concludes with a voice-over, generally providing contrast or a follow-up to the initial narration.

== Cast, characters, and appearance period ==
=== Cast table ===
List indicator

This section includes characters who have appeared in the series as credited cast.

- An empty grey cell indicates the character was not in the season.

Legend
= Main cast (credited)
= Recurring cast (3+)
= Guest cast (1–2)

Actor	Character	Seasons																						
Actor	Character	1	2	3	4	5	6	7	8	9	10	11	12	13	14	15	16	17	18	19	20	21	22	23
Ellen Pompeo	Meredith Grey	M (Note: Ellen Pompeo makes her last regular appearance in 19x07. She continues to narrate most episodes and appears sporadically in the following episodes and subsequent seasons. Pompeo continues to receive top billing in any episodes in which she appears and/or provides narration for.)	M	M	M	M	M	M	M	M	M	M	M	M	M	M	M	M	M	M	M	M	M	M
Sandra Oh	Cristina Yang	M	M	M	M	M	M	M	M	M	M													
Katherine Heigl	Izzie Stevens	M (Note: Katherine Heigl makes her final appearance in 6x12 but is credited through 6x18.)	M	M	M	M	M																	
Justin Chambers	Alex Karev	M	M	M	M	M	M	M	M	M	M	M	M	M	M	M	M							
T. R. Knight	George O'Malley	M	M	M	M	M												G						
Chandra Wilson	Miranda Bailey	M	M	M	M	M	M	M	M	M	M	M	M	M	M	M	M	M	M	M	M	M	M	M
James Pickens Jr.	Richard Webber	M	M	M	M	M	M	M	M	M	M	M	M	M	M	M	M	M	M	M	M	M	M	M
Isaiah Washington	Preston Burke	M	M	M							G													
Patrick Dempsey	Derek Shepherd	M	M	M	M	M	M	M	M	M	M	M						R (Note: Patrick Dempsey is credited as a guest star for his appearances with the exception of 17x13, where he is credited as a special guest star.)						
Kate Walsh	Addison Montgomery	G (Note: Kate Walsh was originally set to appear as a recurring character in six episodes of the first season. However, after the season was cut short, Walsh's remaining five appearances aired in the second season before she was promoted to the main cast in what would have been the second episode of season two.)	M (Note: Kate Walsh is initially credited as a special guest star in season two before being promoted to main cast in 2x07.)	M	SG	SG	SG	SG	SG										R (Note: Kate Walsh is credited as a special guest star in a recurring capacity.)	R			SG	
Sara Ramirez	Callie Torres		R	M	M	M	M	M	M	M	M	M	M											
Eric Dane	Mark Sloan		G	M (Note: Eric Dane is credited as a series regular from 3x03 through 9x02. In 3x02 he is uncredited.)	M	M	M	M	M	M								SG						
Chyler Leigh	Lexie Grey			G	M	M	M	M	M									SG						
Brooke Smith	Erica Hahn		R	G	M (Note: Brooke Smith is the only series regular to not hold the role for a full season. She was credited as a series regular from 4x05 to 5x07)	M																		
Kevin McKidd	Owen Hunt					M (Note: Kevin McKidd is initially credited as a guest star in season five before being promoted to main cast in 5x14.)	M	M	M	M	M	M	M	M	M	M	M	M	M	M	M	M	M	
Jessica Capshaw	Arizona Robbins					R	M	M	M	M	M	M	M	M	M						G			
Kim Raver	Teddy Altman						M (Note: Kim Raver is initially credited as guest star in season six before being promoted to main cast in 6x19.)	M	M						R	M	M	M	M	M	M	M	M	
Sarah Drew	April Kepner						R	M	M	M	M	M	M	M	M			G	G					
Jesse Williams	Jackson Avery						R	M	M	M	M	M	M	M	M	M	M	M	G	G		G	G	
Camilla Luddington	Jo Wilson									R	M	M	M	M	M	M	M	M	M	M	M	M	M	M
Gaius Charles	Shane Ross									R	M													
Jerrika Hinton	Stephanie Edwards									R	M	M	M	M										
Tessa Ferrer	Leah Murphy									R	M			R										
Caterina Scorsone	Amelia Shepherd							G	SG		R	M	M	M	M	M	M	M	M	M	M	M	M	M
Kelly McCreary	Maggie Pierce										G	M (Note: Kelly McCreary is initially credited as a guest star in season eleven before being promoted to main cast in 11x11.)	M	M	M	M	M	M	M	M	G		G	
Jason George	Ben Warren						R	G	R	R	R	R	M	M	M	R	R	R	R	R	R	M	M	M
Martin Henderson	Nathan Riggs												M	M	M									
Giacomo Gianniotti	Andrew DeLuca											G	M (Note: Giacomo Gianniotti is initially credited as a guest star in season twelve before being promoted to main cast in 12x10.)	M	M	M	M	M						
Greg Germann	Tom Koracick														R	R	M	M	G	G		G		
Jake Borelli	Levi Schmitt														R (Note: Jake Borelli is initially credited as a co-star in recurring capacity before being upgraded to a guest star in season fifteen.)	R	M (Note: Borelli and Francis exited as series regulars in season twenty-one, but were still billed as starring until 21x08, with Borelli returning for one episode later on that season.)	M	M	M	M	M		
Chris Carmack	Atticus Lincoln															R	M	M	M	M	M	M	M	M
Richard Flood	Cormac Hayes																R	M	M					
Anthony Hill	Winston Ndugu																G	M	M	M	M	M	M	M
Scott Speedman	Nick Marsh														G				M	M	R	R	R	R
Alexis Floyd	Simone Griffith																			M	M	M	M	M
Harry Shum Jr.	Benson Kwan																			M	M	M	M	M
Adelaide Kane	Jules Millin																			M	M	M	M	M
Midori Francis	Mika Yasuda																			M	M	M		
Niko Terho	Lucas Adams																			M	M	M	M	M
Trevor Jackson	Wes Bryant																					G	M	M

=== Main cast ===
The five characters who are first introduced in the series premiere as surgical interns are Meredith Grey, Cristina Yang, Izzie Stevens, Alex Karev, and George O'Malley. They are initially mentored by Dr. Miranda Bailey, a senior resident who becomes the hospital's Chief Resident, and later an attending general surgeon, in Season 6. The surgical program is initially headed by Richard Webber, the Chief of Surgery, who has a pre-existing personal relationship with Meredith, having had an affair with her mother, famed general surgeon Ellis Grey, when Meredith was a child. In Webber's employ are attending neurosurgeon Derek Shepherd, dubbed 'McDreamy' by the residents, and attending cardiothoracic surgeon Preston Burke. Shepherd is introduced as Meredith's love-interest, while Burke begins a relationship with Cristina.

Introduced in the show's second season are obstetrician-gynecologist and neonatal surgeon, Addison Montgomery, plastic and ENT surgeon Mark Sloan (nicknamed 'McSteamy' by the interns), from New York, and orthopedic surgeon Callie Torres. Montgomery is Shepherd's estranged wife who arrives in Seattle seeking reconciliation with him, Sloan is Shepherd's former best friend, who aided the breakdown of his marriage by having an affair with Montgomery, while Torres is introduced as a love-interest, and eventual wife for O'Malley. The penultimate episode of Season 3 introduces Lexie Grey, Meredith's half-sister who unexpectedly decides to pursue her internship at Seattle Grace Hospital after her mother's sudden death, and begins an on-again, off-again relationship with Sloan. Burke and Yang, having been engaged, endeavor to plan their wedding, while Montgomery departs the show in the Season 3 finale, relocating to California, seeking a new life, thus becoming the lead character of the spin-off Private Practice. The Season 3 finale also shows Burke's exit from the show, after leaving Yang at the altar on their wedding day.

The original lead characters of Grey's Anatomy

Grey, Yang, Stevens, and Karev are all promoted to residents in the Season 4 premiere, while O'Malley is forced to repeat his internship year, following his failing of the intern exam. Subsequently, Torres and O'Malley divorce, due to him having an affair with Stevens, initially concealing it from Torres. Early in the fourth season, cardiothoracic surgeon Erica Hahn becomes Torres's love-interest. During the fifth season, Hahn departs from the series after a disagreement with Torres, and O'Malley retakes his intern exam, passes and joins his fellow physicians as a resident. Two new characters are introduced, former United States Army trauma surgeon Dr. Owen Hunt, and pediatric surgeon Dr. Arizona Robbins. Hunt becomes a love-interest for Yang, while Robbins begins a relationship with Torres. When Stevens is diagnosed with Stage 4 metastatic melanoma, she and Karev get married at the conclusion of the fifth season. In addition, Meredith and Shepherd marry, with their vows written on a blue post-it note.

O'Malley dies in the Season 6 premiere, due to injuries sustained from saving a woman from being hit by a bus, and Stevens later departs Seattle following a communication breakdown with her then-husband Karev following the Seattle Grace merger with Mercy West Hospital. New characters are introduced as Seattle Grace Hospital merges with Mercy West Hospital. Residents April Kepner and Jackson Avery transfer to Seattle Grace Hospital from Mercy West Hospital, and Avery has a brief relationship with Lexie, until she reunites with Sloan. Subsequently, Teddy Altman is introduced as the new Chief of Cardiothoracic Surgery. Ben Warren is also introduced in the sixth season, who becomes a romantic interest for Bailey throughout the series, eventually marrying her. In the Season 6 finale, a deceased patient's grieving husband embarks on a shooting spree at the hospital, injuring Karev, Shepherd, and Hunt. In the shooting's emotional reverberations, Yang and Hunt abruptly marry, not wanting to risk separation. Torres and Robbins eventually wed, in Season 7, officiated by Bailey. In Season 8, Webber steps down as Chief of Surgery and allocates his job to Hunt. As the final year of residency for Meredith, Yang, Karev, Kepner and Avery is coming to a close, the doctors are all planning to relocate to different hospitals to pursue their specialty careers. However, all plans are put on hold when several doctors from Seattle Grace Mercy West Hospital are engaged in a plane crash, which kills Lexie and endangers Meredith, Shepherd, Yang, Sloan and Robbins in the Season 8 finale. The season finale also sees Altman being courteously fired by Hunt as she struggles to decide whether or not to take the job as Chief at the United States Army Medical Command (MEDCOM).

In the Season 9 premiere, Sloan dies due to sustained injuries from the plane crash following a brief relapse of temporary health ("the surge") and the remaining characters work through their post traumatic stress and Robbins's loss of limb by way of suing Seattle Grace Mercy West, as the hospital was responsible for putting the surgeons on the plane. Meanwhile, Jo Wilson, Stephanie Edwards, Leah Murphy and Shane Ross are introduced as a new group of interns. The ninth season continues with the struggle of the lawsuit and the animosity that it creates within the hospital, Yang and Hunt eventually divorce in order to help the lawsuit. The doctors who were on the plane win the lawsuit, but the payout bankrupts the hospital. They all club together and buy Seattle Grace Mercy West, with the help of the Harper Avery Foundation, and they become the Board of Directors, once being called the "Grey-Sloan 7". One of the changes they implement is renaming the hospital to Grey Sloan Memorial Hospital in memory of Lexie Grey and Mark Sloan. Robbins cheats on Torres with a visiting facial reconstruction surgeon and Webber gets electrocuted in the Season 9 finale, although survives the incident.

Grey's Anatomy saw the departure of one of its major players, Cristina Yang, played by Sandra Oh, as well as the departure of interns Murphy and Ross, in the Season 10 finale.

Amelia Shepherd, the sister of Derek, joined the main cast in Season 11, transitioning over from being a main character of the spin-off series, Private Practice which had recently ended. The 11th season also saw the introduction of the new Chief of Cardiothoracic Surgery, Maggie Pierce, Richard's secret daughter with Ellis Grey. Towards the end of the 11th season, Derek Shepherd witnesses a car accident and pulls over to help the injured, but his car is hit by a truck with him inside as he attempts to leave the scene. He later dies at another hospital following the doctors' mishandling of his injuries.

Season 12 saw Andrew DeLuca join the main cast as a new intern at the hospital, as well as Nathan Riggs as a new cardiothoracic surgeon with a pre-existing off-screen history with Hunt. The Season 12 finale saw the departure of one of the show's longest-running characters, Callie Torres, played by Sara Ramirez.

Edwards departed at the end of Season 13, deciding to quit her job as a surgeon after surviving a major fire at the hospital. Riggs departed and Altman returned to Seattle toward the beginning of Season 14. The fourteenth season also saw the introduction of Tom Koracick who worked as a new neurosurgeon alongside Amelia Shepherd, Levi Schmitt who is a new intern at the hospital, as well as Andrew's sister, Carina DeLuca, an obstetrician who enters into a relationship with Robbins. During the fourteenth season, Warren transitions out to become a main character of the series' second spin-off, Station 19, after his character decides to quit working at the hospital to become a firefighter. Carina DeLuca eventually joins him as a main character of that spin-off series. Long-time characters, Robbins and Kepner depart the series in the Season 14 finale to pursue other career opportunities.

Season 15 saw the introduction of Atticus "Link" Lincoln, as a new orthopedic surgeon, while Season 16 saw the introduction of Cormac Hayes, a new pediatric surgeon, and Winston Ndugu, a new cardiothoracic surgeon. The sixteenth season was the last to feature Alex Karev, who moved to Kansas to reunite with Stevens, leaving Grey as the last remaining intern from the original cast.

Season 17 saw Nick Marsh, a transplant surgeon, join the ensemble of main characters as a new romantic interest for Meredith Grey. The seventeenth season also saw the departure of Andrew DeLuca, after he was stabbed and ultimately died after pursuing a sex trafficker, and was also the last season to feature both Jackson Avery, who moved to Boston in order to run a family foundation and Koracick, who also moved to Boston to assist Avery, as main characters. Hayes departed the series in Season 18 after deciding to return to Ireland with his kids.

Season 19 saw the introduction of five new interns with Simone Griffith, Mika Yasuda, Benson Kwan, Jules Millin and Lucas Adams, the latter of which is revealed to be a nephew of Amelia and Derek Shepherd. Meredith Grey, one of the last remaining original characters of the series, as well as Pierce, both depart Seattle during the course of Season 19 and appear in recurring and guest capacities afterwards, respectively. Yasuda and Schmitt depart in season 21, with Schmitt moving to Texas for his ped's fellowship and Yasuda quits the program following her sister's death.

=== Recurring ===
With the drama's setting being a hospital, numerous medical personnel appear regularly on the show, as well as several other recurring characters. Joe (Steven W. Bailey) is first shown as the owner of the Emerald City Bar and Grill, across the street from the hospital, which is a common relaxation area for the physicians. Also introduced in the pilot is the legendary former general surgeon, Dr. Ellis Grey (Kate Burton), Meredith's Alzheimer's-stricken mother, who appeared on the show until her death in season 3. In the first season, Olivia Harper (Sarah Utterback), a nurse who appeared on the show occasionally until getting laid off in the merger with Mercy West, engages in a sexual relationship with O'Malley, giving him syphilis. Serving as an assistant and secretary to the Chief of Surgery, former nurse Patricia (Robin Pearson Rose) has appeared on the show since its debut. Tyler Christian (Moe Irvin), a hospital nurse, makes occasional appearances throughout the series. Within the second season, Bailey becomes pregnant by her husband, Tucker Jones (Cress Williams), who makes frequent appearances on Grey's Anatomy, until their divorce in season 5. While Bailey takes a sabbatical, due to her pregnancy, the cheerful Dr. Sydney Heron (Kali Rocha) fills her position as the resident supervising Grey, Yang, Stevens, Karev and O'Malley, and makes occasional appearances until the fifth season.

Thatcher and Susan Grey (Jeff Perry and Mare Winningham), Meredith's estranged father and step-mother, are introduced in season 2, with Susan making appearances until her death in season 3, and Thatcher continuing to appear in the series until his death in season 15. Adele Webber (Loretta Devine), is introduced as Richard's wife, who eventually acquires Alzheimer's, in the seventh season, and continued to make appearances until her death in season 9. Introduced as Preston's mother, Jane Burke (Diahann Carroll) makes occasional appearances until the fourth season. Denny Duquette (Jeffrey Dean Morgan), a patient with congestive heart failure, originates as one of Burke's patients, who goes on to propose to Stevens, after weeks of bonding between the two. Facing death, Stevens cuts Duquette's left ventricular assist device (LVAD), to elevate his position on the United Network for Organ Sharing (UNOS) transplant list. This ultimately ends in his death in the season 2 finale, marking his initial departure from the show, and placing Stevens on disciplinary probation. Initially conceived as a veterinarian hired for Shepherd's dog, Doc, Dr. Finn Dandridge (Chris O'Donnell) soon becomes a love-interest for Meredith, while Shepherd is with Montgomery. Dandridge is included in a multi-episode story arc in seasons 2 and 3, consisting of 9 episodes, ending when Meredith reunites with Shepherd.

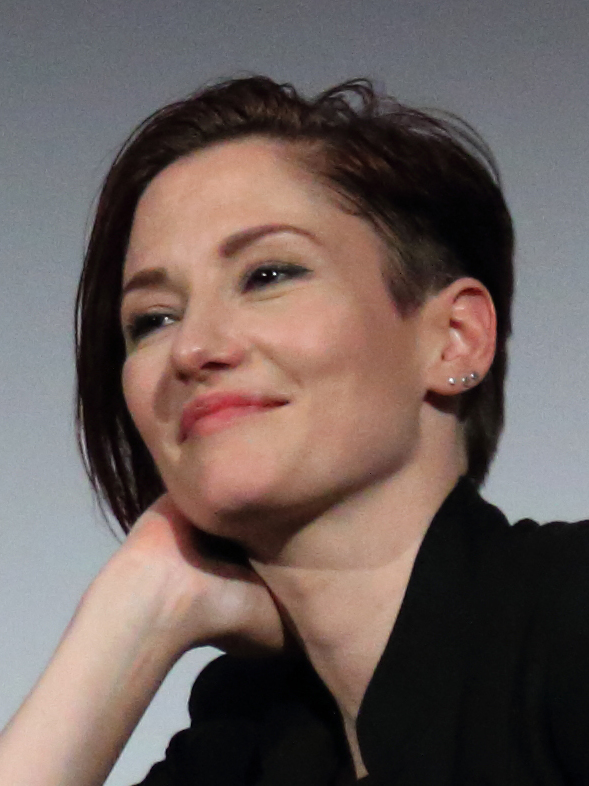
Chyler Leigh's character was introduced in the third season and was promoted to series regular in season 4.

In season 3, George's father, Harold O'Malley (George Dzundza), is diagnosed with cancer and dies, with his wife Louise (Debra Monk) and George's brothers Jerry (Greg Pitts) and Ronny (Tim Griffin) by his side. Louise goes on to appear occasionally, and was last seen in season 8. A ferryboat accident brings along Rebecca Pope (Elizabeth Reaser), who is initially introduced as a pregnant amnesiac Jane Doe patient. Pope eventually embarks on a relationship with Karev, until she is diagnosed with a personality disorder in season 4, and makes her final departure. Amidst the crisis of the ferryboat crash, Meredith falls into the water at the disaster site. Although rescued, she goes into cardiac arrest, waking up in what appears to be limbo. Within the limbo, Meredith is entertained by deceased acquaintances Duquette and Dylan Young (Kyle Chandler), who was killed during a bomb crisis in the second season, until eventually being resuscitated. Seeking a cure to her depression, Meredith undergoes therapy sessions with the hospital psychiatrist, Dr. Katharine Wyatt (Amy Madigan), who in addition serves as a psychiatrist to Hunt.

The season 4 premiere introduces several new interns, to be trained under Meredith, Yang, Stevens, Karev, and eventually O'Malley.^{[b]} Among them are Dr. Steve Mostow (Mark Saul), who continues to make appearances, and Dr. Sadie Harris (Melissa George), who formed a friendship with Meredith while the two were in college. Harris is fired in the fifth season, due to not actually having a medical degree, and departs the show immediately after. Meredith and Shepherd's relationship reaches a crisis, and the two separate, leaving Shepherd to entertain a relationship with Rose (Lauren Stamile), a nurse. Rose appears frequently until season 5, when Derek and Meredith decide to rekindle their flame. Throughout the fifth season, Stevens experiences full-out hallucinations of Duquette, signaling that she is ill, and once she is lucid, he departs, marking his final appearance. Following the announcement of her relationship with Robbins (Jessica Capshaw), Callie's father Carlos Torres (Hector Elizondo) initially contests his daughter's concurrence in homosexuality, but eventually accepts it, and he reappears several times throughout the series.

The hospital's merging with Mercy West introduces new residents: Dr. Reed Adamson (Nora Zehetner) and Dr. Charles Percy (Robert Baker), but the two are both murdered in the season 6 finale. Also introduced in the sixth season is Dr. Ben Warren (Jason George), an anesthesiologist and eventual husband to Dr. Miranda Bailey, as well as Sloan Riley (Leven Rambin), Dr. Mark Sloan's estranged pregnant daughter who seeks kinship with him. Robbins receives a grant to aid children in Malawi, which leads to a falling-out between her and Torres. While in Malawi, Robbins is replaced by Dr. Robert Stark (Peter MacNicol), a pediatric surgeon with an interest in Dr. April Kepner, who appears occasionally until season 8. Following the breakdown of Dr. Torres's relationship with Dr. Robbins, Dr. Torres becomes pregnant with Dr. Sloan's baby. Torres's relationship with Robbins is subsequently mended, and the couple endeavors to raise their new daughter, Sofia Robbin Sloan Torres, with the help of Dr. Sloan. Dr. Lucy Fields (Rachael Taylor), an obstetrician-gynecologist, is introduced in the seventh season, and serves as a love-interest for Dr. Alex Karev, until eventually taking up Robbins' job in Africa. Shepherd and Meredith also become new parents, with their adoption of Zola, a baby girl from Malawi.^{[c]} Conceived as a patient with a tumor condition who later develops diabetes, Henry Burton (Scott Foley) befriends Dr. Altman and eventually joins her in marriage only to get treated using her medical insurance, until he dies while undergoing heart surgery in season 8. Dr Catherine Avery (played by Debbie Allen), a urologist, is introduced in the show's eighth season and subsequently makes recurring appearances in all subsequent seasons thus far. Her character becomes a romantic interest for Dr Richard Webber, and eventually his second wife following the death of his first wife, Adele.

In the season 9 premiere, interns Dr. Jo Wilson (Camilla Luddington), Dr. Shane Ross (Gaius Charles), Dr. Stephanie Edwards (Jerrika Hinton), Dr. Leah Murphy (Tessa Ferrer) and Dr. Heather Brooks (Tina Majorino) are introduced. Steven Culp and William Daniels play Dr. Parker and Dr. Craig Thomas, respectively. Dr. Parker is Chief of Cardiothoracic Surgery and Dr. Craig Thomas (William Daniels) is an attending cardiothoracic surgeon at Mayo Clinic, where Cristina worked temporarily. Dr. Alana Cahill (Constance Zimmer) introduced in season 9 is appointed to cut costs at the hospital and she eventually decides the best course of action would be to seek out a new buyer until the 4 crash survivors and Torres on the behalf of Sloan pool their money together in a bid to purchase the hospital themselves. Kepner starts dating a paramedic named Matthew Taylor (Justin Bruening) and they form a deep relationship over the course of seasons 9 and 10 and she eventually agreed to marry before reconciling with Avery in the middle of her wedding ceremony to Matthew. Lauren Boswell (Hilarie Burton) is introduced as a craniofacial surgeon consulting on a case at Grey Sloan Memorial who showed romantic interest in Arizona and eventually ended up having a one-night stand with her.

Dr. Heather Brooks dies in the premiere of season 10. She goes to search for Dr. Webber and finds him lying in the basement of the hospital. Trying to save Dr. Webber, she accidentally steps into a puddle and electrocutes herself while hitting her head as she falls. Also introduced in season 10 was Dr. Karev's estranged father Jimmy Evans (James Remar) who tries to form a relationship with his son but fails repeatedly, and dies in a botched surgery. The conclusion of season 10 has Cristina leaving Grey Sloan for Dr. Burke's job as head of Klausman Institute for Medical Research in Zurich, while Dr. Ross makes a last-minute decision to follow her in order to study under her. Dr. Maggie Pierce (Kelly McCreary) unknowingly drops a bombshell that she is the child of Dr. Webber and the late Dr. Grey, and was given up at birth for adoption. Dr. Meredith Grey has to accommodate another half-sister in her life. Also, Dr. Yang privately gives her shares in the hospital to Dr. Karev, also giving him her seat on the board. But Dr. Webber all but promises the seat to Dr. Bailey, so the board has to decide between them. Season 11 begins with new surgical residents coming to the hospital. Introduced in season 11 is Dr. Nicole Herman (Geena Davis), who is Chief of Fetal Surgery at Grey Sloan Memorial. Dr. Herman selects Robbins for a fetal surgery fellowship and becomes her mentor. Herman features in a 12-episode arc before departing in episode 14. Season 14 sees the introduction of Taryn Helm (played by Jaicy Elliot), a new intern who eventually becomes a resident, with recurring appearances in the series in all subsequent seasons thus far.

== Production and development ==
=== Conception ===
Shonda Rhimes wanted to make a show that she would enjoy watching, and thought it would be interesting to create a show about "smart women competing against one another".

When asked how she decided to develop a medical drama, Rhimes responded:

I was obsessed with the surgery channels... My sisters and I would call each other up and talk about operations we'd seen on the Discovery Channel. There's something fascinating about the medical world—you see things you'd never imagine, like the fact that doctors talk about their boyfriends or their day while they're cutting somebody open. So when ABC asked me to write another pilot, the [operating room] seemed like the natural setting.

The series was pitched to ABC Entertainment, which gave it the greenlight. It was picked up as a mid-season replacement for Boston Legal in the 2005 television season. Francie Calfo, executive vice president of development at ABC Entertainment, noted that ABC was looking for a medical show that stood apart from the others airing at the time. She pointed out:

Medical shows are hard, and it was hard trying to figure out where ours could be different. But where everybody else is speeding up their medical shows, [Rhimes] found a way to slow it down, so you get to know the characters. There's definitely a strong female appeal to it.

ER is high-speed medicine. The camera flies around, adrenaline is rushing. My show is more personal. The idea for the series began when a doctor told me it was incredibly hard to shave her legs in the hospital shower. At first, that seemed like a silly detail. But then I thought about the fact that it was the only time and place this woman might have to shave her legs. That's how hard the work is.

— Rhimes on the creation of Grey's Anatomy

While creating the characters and writing the initial script, the series' writers did not have specific character descriptions in mind, instead hoping to cast the best actor available for each role. Shonda Rhimes has expressed that if the network had not permitted her to create characters this way, she would have been hesitant to continue with the series. Female roles, in particular, were crafted to be multi-faceted and complex characters.

Rhimes offered her insight:

I wanted to create a world in which you felt as if you were watching very real women. Most of the women I saw on TV didn't seem like people I actually knew. They felt like ideas of what women are. They never got to be nasty or competitive or hungry or angry. They were often just the loving wife or the nice friend. But who gets to be the bitch? Who gets to be the three-dimensional woman?

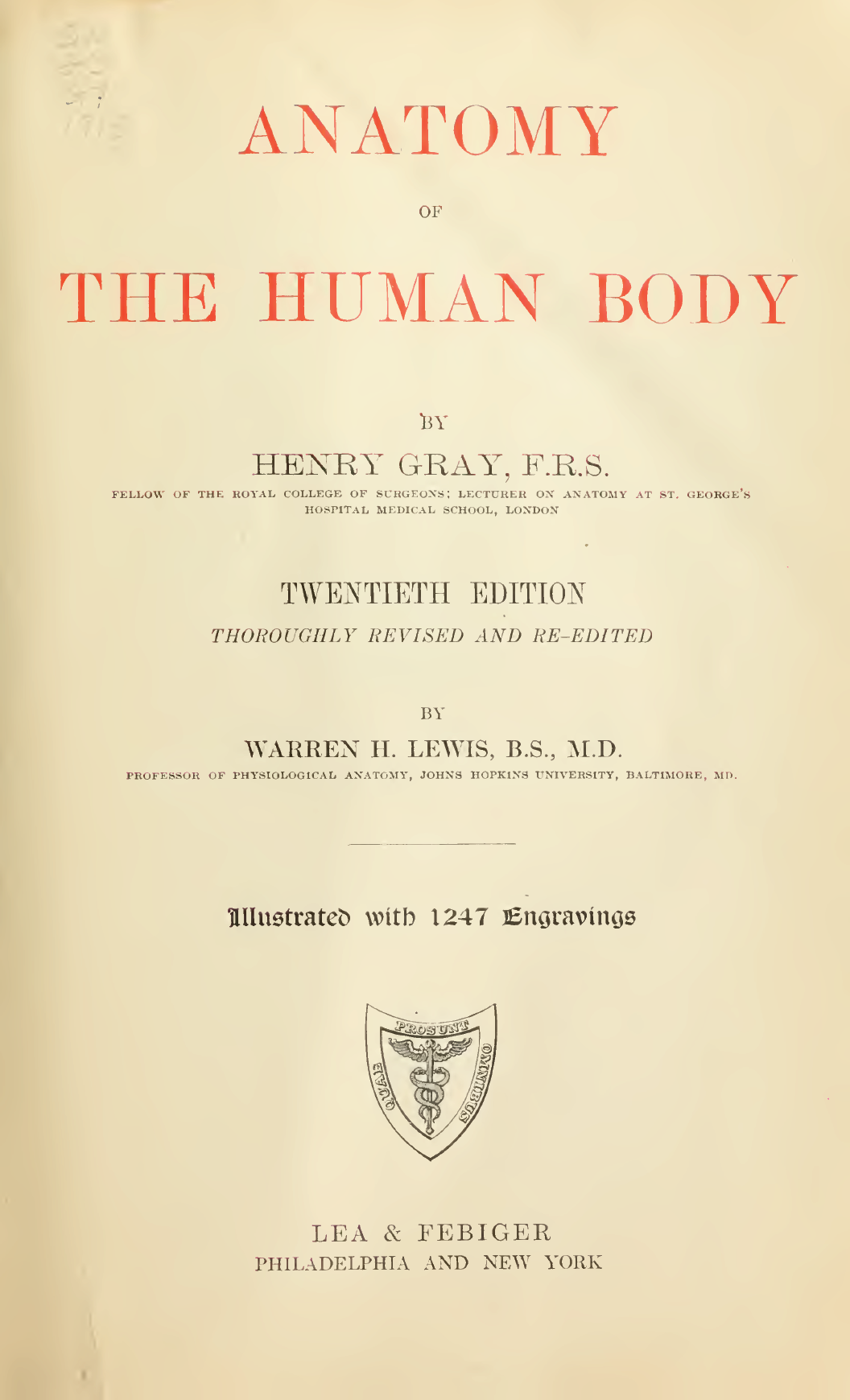
The cover of the book after which Grey's Anatomy was named.

The show's title, Grey's Anatomy, was devised as a play on words, referencing both Henry Gray's classic English medical textbook, Gray's Anatomy (first published in 1858 and still in print), and the title character Dr. Meredith Grey (Ellen Pompeo). All but one episode has been titled after a song, with notable examples including "A Hard Day's Night", "It's the End of the World as We Know It (And I Feel Fine)" (which lent its name to two episodes) and "How to Save a Life". The episode that breaks from the pattern is "1-800-799-7233", which references the National Domestic Violence Hotline, although a song with that name did exist at the time. According to then showrunner Krista Vernoff, the title change was suggested by actor Giacomo Gianniotti (who plays Andrew DeLuca). The original name of the episode was "Four Seasons in One Day".

Before the series debuted on March 27, 2005, a few early screenings were shown to close friends and family of the producers and actors. The show was initially scheduled to run in the Boston Legal time slot for four weeks. Due to its high ratings and viewership, ABC decided to keep it in that time slot for the remainder of the season. ABC Entertainment President, Steve McPherson, explained the scheduling change: "Ultimately, we decided that, without having adequate lead time or marketing dollars to devote to moving either show so late in the season, we'd continue to let [Grey's Anatomy] build on its tremendous momentum through May."

Prior to its broadcast, there were discussions about changing the show's title from Grey's Anatomy to Complications, though this change never took place.

=== Production team ===
List of showrunners throughout the series' run:

- Season 1–5: Shonda Rhimes
- Season 6–7: Shonda Rhimes & Krista Vernoff
- Season 8: Shonda Rhimes, Tony Phelan & Joan Rater
- Season 9–10: Tony Phelan & Joan Rater
- Season 11–13: Stacy Mckee & William Harper
- Season 14–15: William Harper & Krista Vernoff
- Season 16–19: Krista Vernoff
- Season 20-present: Meg Marinis

Grey's Anatomy is a joint production by Shondaland, Lionsgate Television (formerly known as The Mark Gordon Company before season 15 episode 11, and as eOne Television from season 15 episode 11 all the way to the season 19 finale) and 20th Television (formerly Touchstone Television before season 4 episode 3, ABC Studios from season 4 episode 3 all the way to the season 16 finale, and ABC Signature from its season 17 premiere until season 21 episode 8). Shonda Rhimes, Betsy Beers, Krista Vernoff, Mark Gordon, Rob Corn, and Mark Wilding have all served as executive producers throughout the series. In later seasons, Steve Mulholland, Kent Hodder, Nancy Bordson, James D. Parriott, and Peter Horton have also been executive producers, with Allan Heinberg joining the team in 2006. By Season 8, the executive producers were Rhimes, Beers, Gordon, Vernoff, Corn, Wilding, and Heinberg.

Rhimes serves as the series' head writer, or its most prolific writer. In the show's early years, she often promoted the series by answering fan questions on her Twitter account. Other key members of the writing staff include Vernoff, Wilding, Peter Nowalk, Stacy McKee, William Harper, Zoanne Clack, Tony Phelan, Joan Rater, and Debora Cahn. From seasons 2 through 7, the writers maintained a blog titled Grey Matter, where the writer of an episode provided insights into the writing process.

Directors vary by episode, with Rob Corn being the most frequent director, followed by Tom Verica. Horton, Edward Ornelas, and Jessica Yu have also directed numerous episodes. Cast members Chandra Wilson, Debbie Allen and Kevin McKidd have each directed multiple episodes as well.

Susan Vaill has edited Grey's Anatomy since its inception, with David Greenspan joining as an editor in 2006. Casting directors Linda Lowy and John Brace have been part of the production team since 2005. The show's production design is led by Donald Lee Harris, with Brian Harms assisting as art director. Mimi Melgaard heads costume design, with Thomas Houchins supervising costumes. Ellen Vieira serves as the makeup artist, while Jerilynn Stevens is the hairstylist. The Director of Photography is Herbert Davis, and the music coordinator is Danny Lux.

The show's medical authenticity is ensured by consultants Karen Lisa Pike, M.D. and Linda Klein, R.N. In an interview, Ellen Pompeo (who plays Meredith Grey) shared that the cast frequently consults the medical team for accuracy, asking about procedures and surgeries to ensure authenticity. Many cast members observed real-life surgeries to prepare for their roles.

In addition to their work on the show, the production staff participates in a Grey's Anatomy softball team, which competes against teams from other television shows, such as CSI: Crime Scene Investigation.

=== Casting ===
She brought this energy that felt very fresh. From the beginning, I've been shaping Cristina around Sandra a little bit. One of my favorite things to do is take as much of her dialogue out of a scene as possible because she does so much nonverbally. Then I just watch what she manages to do without having a word to say.

— Rhimes on Oh's audition

Grey's Anatomy used a color-blind casting technique, resulting in a racially diverse ensemble. Each role was cast without the character's race being pre-determined, keeping Rhimes's vision of diversity. The production staff began casting with the program's title character, Dr. Meredith Grey, which Rhimes said was a challenging role to cast. "I kept saying we need a girl like that girl from Moonlight Mile (2002)^{[a]}," said Rhimes, "and after a while, they were like, 'We think we can get that girl from Moonlight Mile." The next to be cast, Sandra Oh (Dr. Cristina Yang), was initially invited to audition for the character of Bailey, but pressed to read for the role of Cristina instead. Many actors read for the role of Dr. Derek Shepherd. Rob Lowe was offered the role, but turned it down as he had already agreed to star in another medical drama Dr. Vegas. When Patrick Dempsey read for the part, "he was just perfect," according to Rhimes.

The only character developed with a racial description in mind was Dr. Miranda Bailey, who is portrayed by Chandra Wilson. Her character was first described as a tiny blonde with curly hair, but when Wilson began speaking, Rhimes reported: "[Wilson] is exactly who Miranda is." James Pickens Jr. was selected to appear as Dr. Richard Webber in the series' pilot and first season. Katherine Heigl wanted to portray Dr. Izzie Stevens as a brunette but was requested to retain her natural blonde for the part. Isaiah Washington, who portrayed Dr. Preston Burke, initially read for the role of Shepherd but was cast as Burke, because the actor who had been intended to play Burke, Paul Adelstein, had to withdraw due to commitments to the movie Be Cool. T. R. Knight signed on for the pilot as Dr. George O'Malley, expecting that the role might be short-lived, because he liked that the character was multi-faceted. Rounding out the season 1 cast was Justin Chambers as Dr. Alex Karev, a character who was not originally included in the show's pilot, but added through digital editing and additional scenes.

Rhimes later shifted focus away from physical descriptions of characters, instead emphasizing the feelings and qualities they conveyed.

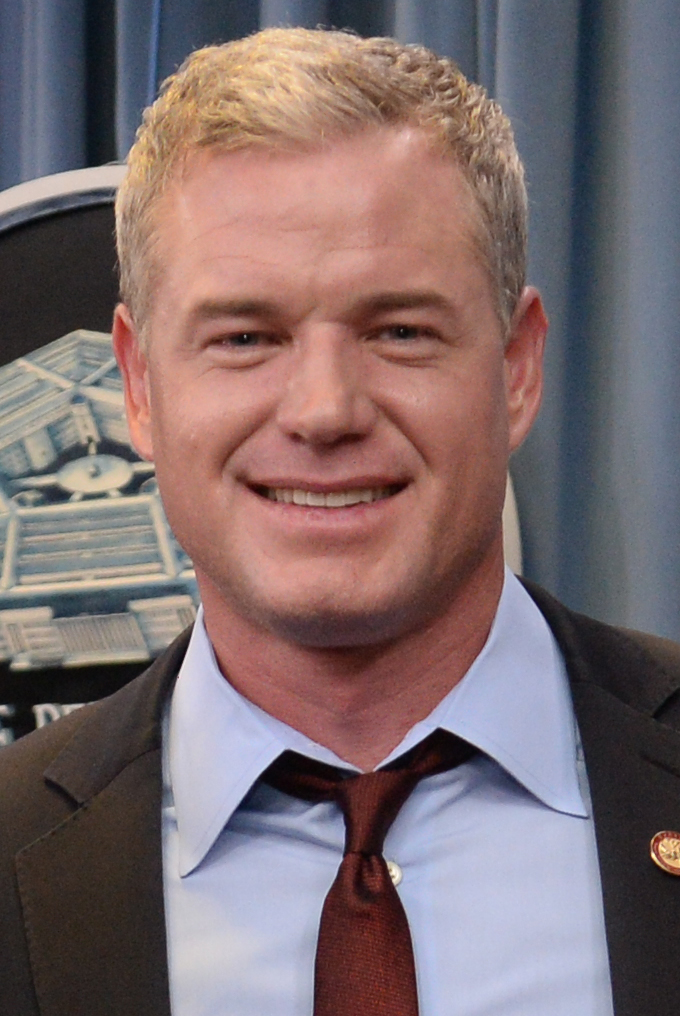
Eric Dane originally auditioned for the pilot episode of Grey's Anatomy, but was not cast at that time.

Season 2 marked the introduction of attending doctors Mark Sloan (Eric Dane) and Callie Torres (Sara Ramirez). They were initially cast as recurring characters, but both were given star billing at the opening of Season 3. Ramirez was cast after ABC executives offered them a role in the network show of their choice; Dane had previously auditioned unsuccessfully for a role in the pilot episode. Dr. Addison Montgomery (Kate Walsh) also joined the show in Season 2, after making a guest appearance in the season 1 finale

In October 2006, Washington allegedly insulted Knight with a homophobic slur, during an on-set altercation with Dempsey, and ABC terminated Washington's contract at the end of Season 3. Washington returned for a guest appearance in season 10. At the conclusion of Season 3, Walsh departed the show to pursue the Grey's Anatomy spin-off, Private Practice, but continues to make guest appearances.

Chyler Leigh joined the cast as a main character in Season 4 as Dr. Lexie Grey, Meredith's half-sister. Leigh had appeared as a guest-star in the final 2 episodes of Season 3. On the selection of Leigh for the role of Lexie, Rhimes said: "Chyler stood out ... It felt like she could be Meredith's sister, but she had a depth that was very interesting."

Dr. Erica Hahn (Brooke Smith), who first appeared on Grey's Anatomy in Season 2, returned as a series regular in Season 4. Shortly after the announcement that Smith would be a regular member of the cast, Entertainment Weekly's Michael Ausiello, reported that her character, Hahn, would depart from Grey's Anatomy on November 6, 2008. E! Online's Kristin Dos Santos asserted that Smith's dismissal from the show had been forced by the ABC network, as part of an attempt to "de-gay" Grey's Anatomy. Rhimes countered these claims, saying that "we did not find that the magic and chemistry with Brooke's character would sustain in the long run".

Season 5 introduced actor Kevin McKidd (Dr. Owen Hunt), who was signed as a series regular after originally being cast for a specific story-arc. In addition, Jessica Capshaw (Dr. Arizona Robbins) was originally introduced for a three-episode arc, but her contract was extended until the end of the season; she became a series regular in the sixth season.

Knight departed the show at the conclusion of Season 5, citing an unhappiness with the development and lack of screen-time for his character. Directly following Knight's departure, Entertainment Weekly reported that Heigl had not returned to the set as scheduled after her maternity leave. It was later confirmed that Heigl would not return to the show at all.

Kim Raver, who was cast as recurring character Dr. Teddy Altman in season 6, was given star billing later in the season. Sarah Drew (Dr. April Kepner) and Jesse Williams (Dr. Jackson Avery), who both made their series debuts as recurring characters in the sixth season, and received star-billing in the seventh.

The six original actors' contracts expired after Season 8, but in May 2012, Pompeo, Oh, Chambers, Wilson, Pickens Jr. and Dempsey renewed their contracts with the show for another two years. At the conclusion of season 8, Leigh's character Lexie Grey departed from the show at Leigh's request, and with Rhimes's agreement. Raver's character Teddy Altman was also written out of the show during the Season 8 finale. Rhimes said that Raver had been offered a contract renewal, but declined.

In July 2012, Dane (Sloan) confirmed that he was departing the show to pursue other projects; he made his final appearances in the first two episodes of Season 9. With the start of season 10, Camilla Luddington, Gaius Charles, Jerrika Hinton and Tessa Ferrer were introduced to the show as series regulars. They were first introduced to the show in season 9 as the new interns. On August 13, 2013, Oh (Cristina) announced that the show's tenth season would be her final one because she had decided to pursue more diverse career opportunities. In March 2014, it was announced that Isaiah Washington, who portrayed Preston Burke in the first three seasons of the show, would make a guest appearance to coincide with the departure of series regular Sandra Oh, his former on-screen love-interest. Neither Charles's nor Ferrer's contracts were renewed for Season 11.

On May 2, 2014, it was announced that, in addition to Pompeo and Dempsey, all the original remaining cast members—apart from Oh—signed 2-year deals, extending their contracts through seasons 11 and 12. Despite joining the series in season 2, Sara Ramirez was on the same negotiation schedule as the season 1 cast and also signed a new two-year deal. On April 23, 2015, Dempsey departed the show during the show's 11th season, despite the fact that he still had a year left in his contract. Dempsey decided to leave because the show was too time-consuming. He wanted to spend more time with his family, so in season 11 his character died. On the night of the Season 12 finale, May 19, 2016, Sara Ramirez announced that they would be leaving the show following the decision not to renew their contract.

On January 17, 2018, it was announced by ABC that Ellen Pompeo's contract had been renewed through Season 16. Not only did the contract renewal ensure that Pompeo would return as Meredith Grey, but it made her a producer of Grey's Anatomy and a co-executive producer of Station 19. The deal made Pompeo the highest-paid actress currently on a dramatic TV series, with her making $575,000 per episode and over $20 million yearly. On March 8, 2018, it was announced that series regulars Jessica Capshaw and Sarah Drew would not be returning for Season 15 after executive producers decided to let them go. In May 2018, it was confirmed that Kim Raver, who made returning guest appearances in Season 14, would once again become a series regular, beginning with season 15. In January 2020, Justin Chambers announced that he had departed the series to pursue more diverse career opportunities and that his final episode had aired on November 14, 2019. In March 2021, Giacomo Gianniotti departed the series after wanting to pursue new things such as directing. In May 2021, Jesse Williams and Greg Germann both left the main cast, although Germann is expected to remain on the show in a guest capacity. In September 2021, it was announced that Kate Walsh would be returning as Addison Montgomery for multiple episodes in season 18. In July 2022, it was announced that Alexis Floyd, Niko Terho, Adelaide Kane, Midori Francis and Harry Shum Jr. joined the cast as series regular for the nineteenth season. In August 2022, it was announced that Ellen Pompeo will appear in only eight episodes of the upcoming nineteenth season, but that she will continue to narrate the episodes and will remain an executive producer. In May 2024, it was announced that Jake Borelli will leave the series in season 21, along with Midori Francis. In June 2024, it was announced that Jason George would be reupped to a series regular after appearing in a recurring capacity since the series' fifteenth season due to appearing on Station 19. In August 2024, it was announced that Michael Thomas Grant will recur as new hospital chaplain James.

=== Filming locations and techniques ===
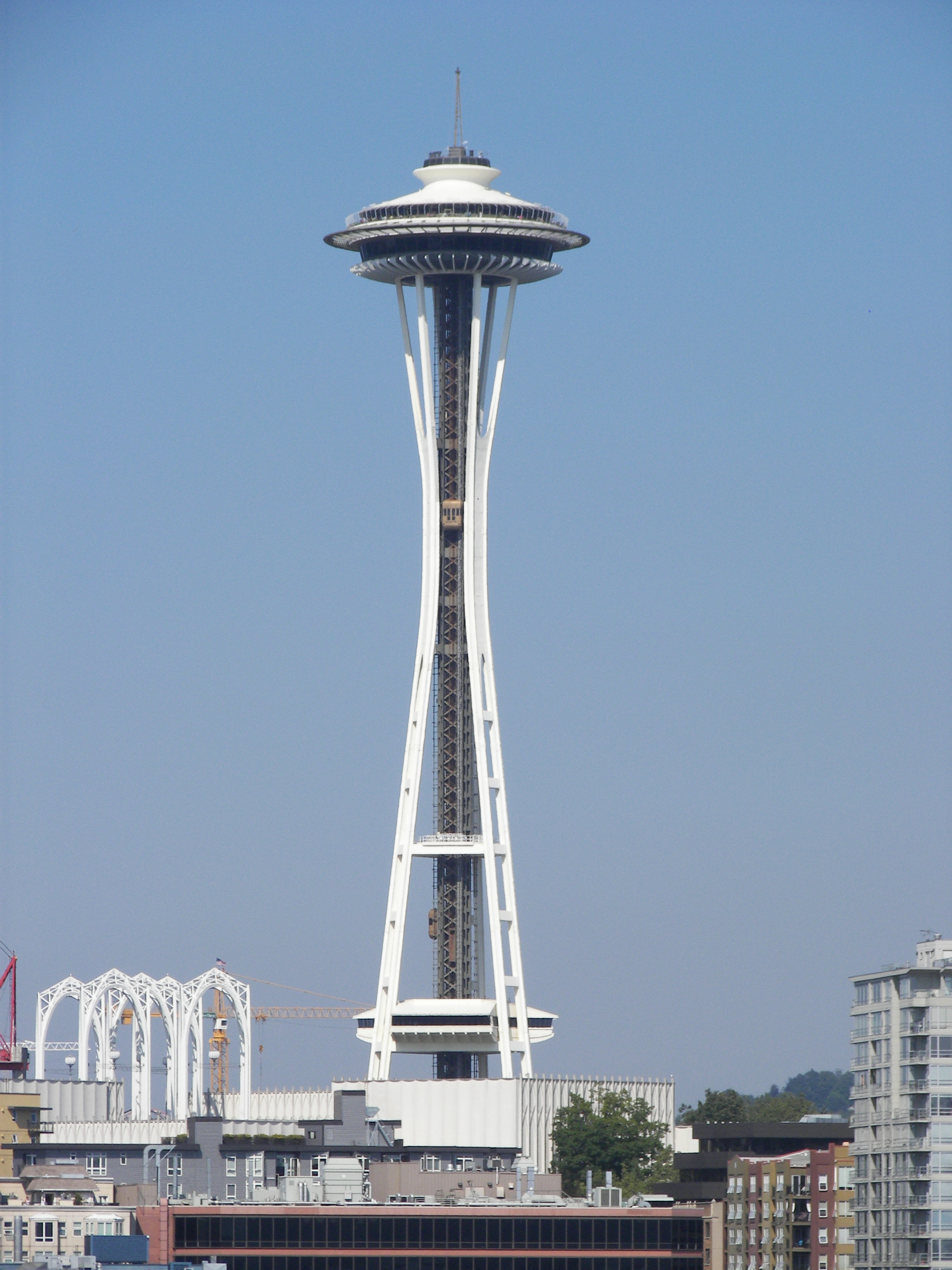
The Space Needle, in Seattle, is the background to many exterior shots.

Rhimes initially considered setting the medical drama in her hometown, Chicago, but ultimately decided on Seattle to distinguish Grey's Anatomy from the Chicago-based series ER.

Fisher Plaza, the former headquarters of Fisher Communications (now merged into Sinclair Broadcast Group) and home to Sinclair's ABC-affiliated KOMO radio and television stations in Seattle, is used for some exterior shots of Grey Sloan Memorial Hospital. Notably, air ambulances land on the KOMO-TV news copter's helipad, suggesting the hospital's proximity to the Space Needle (located across the street from Fisher Plaza), the Seattle Monorail, and other iconic landmarks.

However, the hospital used for most exterior and some interior shots is not located in Seattle; these scenes are filmed at the VA Sepulveda Ambulatory Care Center in North Hills, Los Angeles, California, and shots from an interior walkway occasionally show dry California mountains in the background. Most scenes are filmed at The Prospect Studios in Los Feliz, Los Angeles, just east of Hollywood, where Grey's Anatomy occupies six sound stages. Some outdoor scenes are shot at Warren G. Magnuson Park in Seattle.

The exterior of Meredith Grey's house, also known as the Intern House, is a real location. In the show, Grey's home address is 613 Harper Lane, though this is not a real address. The physical house is located at 303 W. Comstock St., in Queen Anne, Seattle, Washington.

Many of the props used in the show are functional medical equipment, including a working MRI machine. When asked about operating room scenes, Sarah Drew (who plays April Kepner) said:

We work with bovine organs, which is cow's organs, The smell is repulsive and makes us all gag. And we use an actual soldering tool to solder the organs. It smells like burning flesh. There's also a lot of silicone and blood matter, red jello mixed with blood and chicken fat. It's pretty gross.

Costumes are used to differentiate between attending surgeons and residents: attending surgeons wear navy blue scrubs, while residents wear light blue scrubs. The series is filmed using a single-camera setup, similar to many other dramas. Grey's Anatomy often utilizes the "walk-and-talk" filming technique, a method popularized by earlier series such as St. Elsewhere, ER, and The West Wing.

== Broadcast history ==
Season	Episodes	Originally released		Rank	Rating
Season	Episodes	First released	Last released	Rank	Rating
1	9	March 27, 2005	May 22, 2005	8	11.6
2	27	September 25, 2005	May 15, 2006	5	12.5
3	25	September 21, 2006	May 17, 2007	7	12.1
4	17	September 27, 2007	May 22, 2008	9	10.4
5	24	September 25, 2008	May 14, 2009	10	9.6
6	24	September 24, 2009	May 20, 2010	11	9.0
7	22	September 23, 2010	May 19, 2011	17	7.5
8	24	September 22, 2011	May 17, 2012	21	7.6
9	24	September 27, 2012	May 16, 2013	18	7.7
10	24	September 26, 2013	May 15, 2014	11	8.5
11	25	September 25, 2014	May 14, 2015	17	7.8
12	24	September 24, 2015	May 19, 2016	11	7.9
13	24	September 22, 2016	May 18, 2017	16	7.3
14	24	September 28, 2017	May 17, 2018	12	7.1
15	25	September 27, 2018	May 16, 2019	20	6.5
16	21	September 26, 2019	April 9, 2020	30	7.0
17	17	November 12, 2020	June 3, 2021	36	7.6
18	20	September 30, 2021	May 26, 2022	34	6.4
19	20	October 6, 2022	May 18, 2023	42	5.2
20	10	March 14, 2024	May 30, 2024	42	5.1
21	18	September 26, 2024	May 15, 2025	79	6.9
22	18	October 9, 2025	May 7, 2026	TBA	TBA
23	13	October 15, 2026	TBA	TBA	TBA

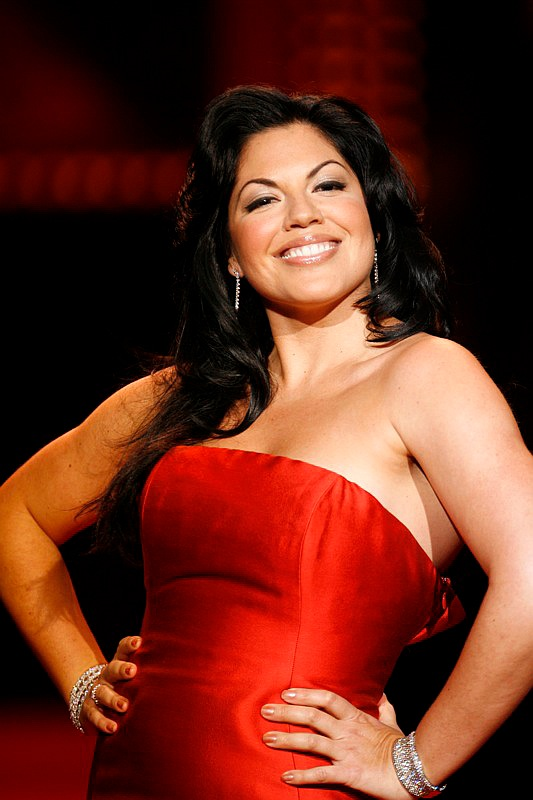
Sara Ramirez served as the lead vocalist for the musical episode.

Grey's Anatomy's first season commenced airing as a mid-season replacement to Boston Legal on March 27, 2005, and concluded on May 22, 2005. The 9-episode season aired on Sundays in the 10:00pm EST time slot, following Desperate Housewives, although it had initially been slated for a January 2005 debut in the Monday 10:00pm EST time slot. The show was renewed by ABC for a second season, that aired in the same time slot as season 1. Premiering on September 25, 2005, and concluding on May 15, 2006, the season consisted of 27 episodes. As the original first season order was for 13 episodes, 5 episodes were held for season 2, as ABC decided to close the first season of Grey's Anatomy on the same night as Desperate Housewives' finale. During season 2, Grey's Anatomy produced 2 specials recapping the events of recent episodes, narrated by Bailey, entitled "Straight to the Heart" and "Under Pressure". The show was renewed for a third season, which was relocated to the coveted Thursday 9:00 pm EST time slot. The show has remained on Thursdays since then. Commencing on September 21, 2006, and ending on May 17, 2007, season 3 consisted of 25 episodes. 2 more specials were produced during the show's third season, entitled "Complications of the Heart" and "Every Moment Counts", which were narrated by Bailey and Morgan, respectively.

ABC renewed Grey's Anatomy for a fourth season, which aired from September 27, 2007, to May 22, 2008, and ultimately consisted of 17 episodes. Season 4 had a reduced number of episodes, due to the 2007–08 Writers Guild of America strike, which caused production to cease from February to April, leaving the show with no writing staff during that time. At the beginning of season 4, the show aired its final special entitled "Come Rain Or Shine", created to transition viewers from Grey's Anatomy to Private Practice, which was narrated by the editors of People magazine. The show received a renewal for a fifth season, which premiered on September 25, 2008, and concluded on May 14, 2009, consisting of 24 episodes. The series was renewed for a sixth season consisting of 24 episodes, which commenced on September 24, 2009, and ended on May 20, 2010. During season 6, Grey's Anatomy aired a series of webisodes entitled Seattle Grace: On Call at ABC.com. ABC renewed the show for a seventh season, which premiered on September 23, 2010, and concluded on May 19, 2011, consisting of 22 episodes. This was followed up with Seattle Grace: On Call, Seattle Grace: Message of Hope, aired during the beginning of season 7. Also during season 7, the series produced a musical episode entitled "Song Beneath the Song", featuring songs that became famous through their use in Grey's Anatomy. The show received a 24-episode eighth season renewal, which commenced on September 22, 2011, with a 2-hour episode, and ended on May 17, 2012. Grey's Anatomy was renewed for a ninth season, which premiered on September 27, 2012, and ended on May 16, 2013. Grey's Anatomy was renewed for a tenth season on May 10, 2013 and premiered on September 27, 2013, with a 2-hour episode, and ended on May 15, 2014.

On May 8, 2014, ABC renewed the series for an 11th season that aired from September 25, 2014, to May 14, 2015. In addition, the show was relocated to the Thursday 8:00 pm EST time slot. After four seasons outside the Top 25 rated shows, Grey's Anatomy was the No. 15 show in the 2013–2014 season, the show's tenth. The show also re-entered the Top 5 shows in the 18–49 viewer demographic. On May 7, 2015, ABC renewed the series for a 12th season that premiered on September 24, 2015, and concluded on May 19, 2016. The 13th season aired from September 22, 2016, to May 18, 2017. The 14th season aired from September 28, 2017, to May 17, 2018. The 15th season aired from September 27, 2018, to May 16, 2019. The 16th season aired from September 26, 2019, to April 9, 2020. The 17th season aired from November 12, 2020, to June 3, 2021. On May 10, 2021, the series was renewed for an 18th season, which premiered on September 30, 2021. On January 10, 2022, the series was renewed for a 19th season, which premiered on October 6, 2022. On March 24, 2023, ABC renewed the series for a 20th season with Meg Marinis now serving as the showrunner. The 20th season premiered on March 14, 2024. In April 2024, ABC announced the show had been picked up for a 21st season, with Marinis remaining as the show-runner. In a statement, Rhimes expressing her gratitude for Marnis, who joined the series during the third season, telling The Hollywood Reporter: "Meg Marinis' storytelling is a gift that continues to keep the show vibrant, compelling and alive, and I can't wait to see what she has in store for next season." On April 3, 2025, ABC renewed the series for a 22nd season which premiered on October 16, 2025. On March 30, 2026, ABC renewed the series for a 23rd season.

== Distribution ==
Grey's Anatomy episodes air regularly on ABC in the United States. Each episode is approximately 43 minutes long and is broadcast in both high and standard-definition. The series' episodes are also available for download in both qualities on the iTunes Store and Amazon Video. ABC Video-On-Demand offers recent episodes for temporary viewing, while episodes can also be streamed on ABC's official Grey's Anatomy website, as well as on Hulu and Xfinity.

In 2009, ABC signed a deal to allow episodes to stream on Netflix. The show is syndicated on Lifetime, with one-hour blocks airing weekdays at 1:00 pm, 2:00 pm, and 3:00 pm EST. In certain regions, such as Germany and the United Kingdom, the full series is available on Disney+.

== Home media releases ==
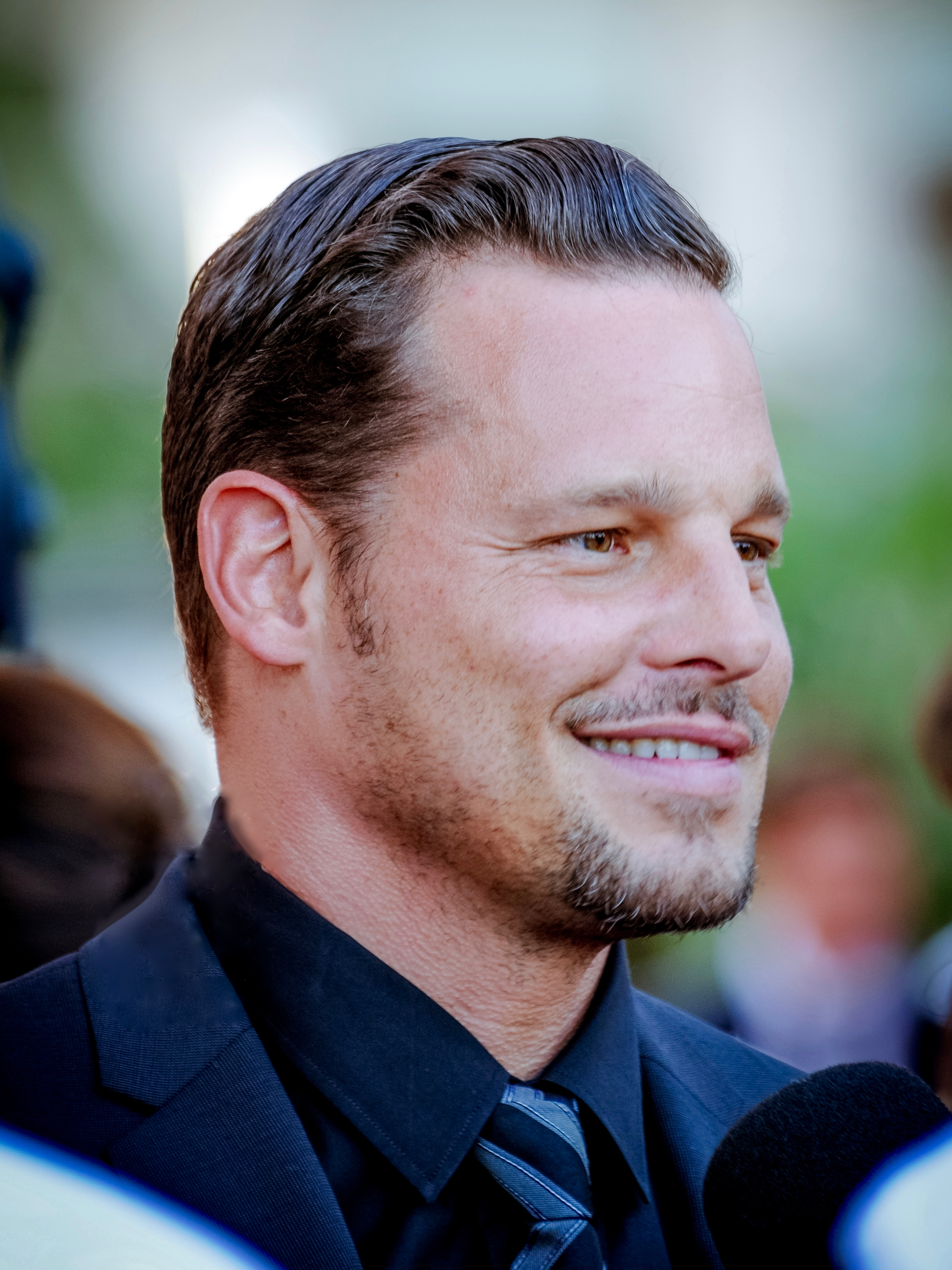
An interview with Justin Chambers is on the season 4 DVD.

Since its debut, Buena Vista Home Entertainment has released the first 13 seasons on DVD to regions 1, 2, and 4. The season 1 DVD, released on February 14, 2006, features an alternate title sequence, bloopers, behind-the-scenes footage, audio commentaries, and an extended edition of the pilot episode. The season 2 DVD, released on September 12, 2006, which includes extended episodes, an interview with Wilson, deleted scenes, a set tour, a "Q&A" with the cast, and a segment on the special effects creation. The season 3 DVD was released on September 11, 2007, with bonus features including extended episodes, an interview with star Dempsey, audio commentaries, and bloopers.

The season 4 DVD released on September 9, 2008, features an interview with Heigl and Chambers, extended episodes, bloopers, and deleted scenes. The season 5 DVD was released on September 15, 2009, and includes unaired scenes, bloopers, and extended episodes. The season 6 DVD, released on September 14, 2010, features deleted scenes, an extended finale, and bloopers. The season 7 DVD, released on September 13, 2011, includes an extended edition of and a behind-the-scenes featurette on the musical episode, bloopers, as well as deleted scenes. In addition, the season 8 DVD was released on September 4, 2012, with several bonus features and deleted scenes.

The season 9 DVD released on August 27, 2013, with several bonus features and deleted scenes. The season 10 DVD was released on September 2, 2014, with new several bonus features and deleted scenes. The season was officially released on DVD as a 6-disc box-set under the title of Grey's Anatomy: The Complete Tenth Season – Live For The Moments on September 2, 2014. In view of the departure of the character of Cristina Yang in the season finale, the DVD set featured an extended episode Do You Know? and a special feature from Sandra Oh titled "An Immeasurable Gift". Season 11 released on DVD as a 6-disc box set on August 18, 2015, with interviews with new series regular Caterina Scorsone and a special feature for Dempsey's departure, titled "How To Say Goodbye Dr. Derek Shepherd". Season 12 released on DVD as a 6-disc box set on August 30, 2016. Season 13 released on DVD as a 6-disc box set on August 29, 2017.

=== DVD releases ===
Season	Episodes	DVD release dates			
Season	Episodes	Region 1	Region 2	Region 4	Discs
1	9	February 14, 2006	July 10, 2006	April 26, 2006	2
2	27	September 12, 2006	May 28, 2007	January 10, 2007	6
3	25	September 11, 2007	September 15, 2008	October 31, 2007	7
4	17	September 9, 2008	November 23, 2009	November 5, 2008	5
5	24	September 15, 2009	August 23, 2010	November 4, 2009	7
6	24	September 14, 2010	December 5, 2011	November 3, 2010	6
7	22	September 13, 2011	May 28, 2012	November 2, 2011	6
8	24	September 4, 2012	December 3, 2012	October 17, 2012	6
9	24	August 27, 2013	November 4, 2013	October 2, 2013	6
10	24	September 2, 2014	November 3, 2014	October 8, 2014	6
11	25	August 18, 2015	October 5, 2015	October 7, 2015	6
12	24	August 30, 2016	October 3, 2016	November 2, 2016	6
13	24	August 29, 2017	October 23, 2017	November 8, 2017	6
14	24	October 2, 2018	October 22, 2018	November 7, 2018	6
15	25	November 12, 2019	November 25, 2019	November 13, 2019	7
16	21	September 1, 2020	November 30, 2020	November 11, 2020	5
17	17	November 8, 2021	November 8, 2021	November 17, 2021	5
18	20	November 9, 2022	November 21, 2022	November 9, 2022	6
19	20		November 8, 2023		6

== Reception ==
=== Critical response ===
Grey's Anatomy offers a different and perhaps more valuable idea of what it means to be strong: the capacity to suffer terribly, break down completely, and then get up again, confident that you're bigger than the sum of the tragedies you've suffered—because everyone else is, too. The layers of history have grown pretty dense and rich, and the friendships that form around them as the characters suffer and survive is the glue of the series, and what—despite a few inevitable hit-or-miss patches—elevates it to something special.

— Laura Hudson of Wired

Grey's Anatomy has been well received among critics. As of August 2023, the show holds an average score of 84% on Rotten Tomatoes. Emily St. James of The A.V. Club described the series' quality as "all over the place". She noted the steady build-up in the first season; the series skyrocketing into a phenomenon in the second season; the gradual dip in season three; and "some seriously bumpy moments" in the fourth season, which was interrupted by the writers' strike. St. James felt that the "climb begins again in season five". Samantha Highfill of Entertainment Weekly in a review wrote, "I believe the show's best season to date is season 2. Let me make it clear that I'm not saying seasons 3 through 9 were bad. In my opinion, there have only been a few lulls in the show's history, and most of them didn't last a full season." adding, "I still enjoy the show, and I'll honestly never stop watching. By any standards, Grey's Anatomy has been successful television, ranking highly in the ratings for nine seasons and entering the cultural lexicon via phrases as cloying yet catchy as 'McDreamy', the show has had its periods of being intensely irritating, and it has had its periods when it seems as if Shonda Rhimes has taken leave of her faculties, but it's also got an amazingly high batting average, particularly with every solid season that passes along in this second act of its run." The site lauded the show saying, "On average, it's been very good TV, filled with interesting, driven characters who run the gamut of professions within the show's hospital setting. It's been, by turns, a good soap, a good romantic comedy, a good medical drama, and a good interpersonal show about an unexpected workplace family."

The first season received positive reviews which steadily built up, with Gary Levin of USA Today calling Grey's Anatomy one of the top shows on television. The New York Daily News named Grey's Anatomy a "winner", and Newsday expressed a positive opinion by stating "You simply can't stop watching." The Washington Post's Tom Shales was critical of season one, finding it reminiscent of ER and commenting that "the show is much more a matter of commercial calculation than an honest attempt to try something fresh and different." Shortly after its initial airing, the Chicago Tribune's Maureen Ryan called Grey's Anatomy the new Friends (a concluded National Broadcasting Company (NBC) sitcom following the lives of a group of young adults, that for all of its 10-year run was in the top-5 for viewer ratings). The second season received high critical acclaim: critics including Emily St. James of The A.V. Club called the show a "phenomenon", adding the show was "one of the best TV shows around", while Samantha Highfill of Entertainment Weekly later during the tenth season called the second "the show's best season to date". However, Kevin Carr of 7M Pictures opined that Grey's Anatomy is a mere combination of Scrubs, ER, Sex and the City and The Love Boat. It further garnered positive reviews: Christopher Monfette of IGN added "The second season of this medical drama expertly wove its signature elements of complex relationships, whimsical banter and challenging life-lessons; all to a montage-fetish, indie-rock soundtrack." Todd Gilchrist, also from IGN, called the season "terrific" adding, "Indeed, one of the best currently on television. While it remains to be seen what the creators do with it, now that it's become an outright event program, the season demonstrates that Rhimes and co. know what to do with the opportunities presented them. Whether you're male or female, this is the kind of entertainment that small-screen devotees and folks fed up with television need to see."

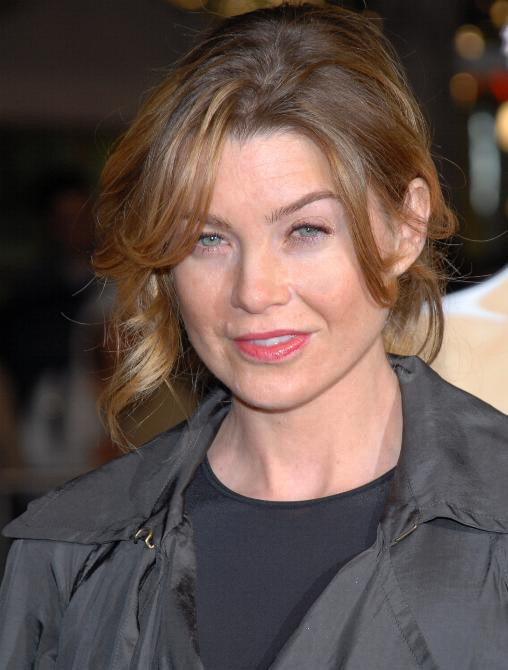
Critics have highlighted Ellen Pompeo's acting as due for an Emmy Award on multiple occasions.

The title character of Grey's Anatomy, Meredith, has received both praise and criticism from reviewers. Earlier reactions for Meredith were mixed; in a 2006 review, Alessandra Stanley of The New York Times dubbed her "the heroine of Grey's Anatomy". A reviewer for BuddyTV praised the distinct uniqueness in the character calling Meredith an "unconventional heroine" adding that the character was "Neither black nor white but always ... wait for it ... many shades of grey." The reviewer went on to add that even in her lighter moments, she has still been "dark and twisty." The sentiment was shared by Glenn Diaz who remarked, "You gotta love Mer when she's gloomy." When Pompeo did not receive a nomination at the 61st Primetime Emmy Awards, for her work as Meredith, Mary McNamara of the Los Angeles Times suggested that Pompeo, "has worked very hard ... to make Meredith Grey an interesting character", and should have received a nomination. IGN's Monfette, less impressed by the character, criticized her storyline as "some bizarrely under-developed sub-plot about depression and giving Derek a season's worth of reconsidering to do." Robert Rorke of the New York Post was critical of Meredith's relationship with Derek Shepherd, writing: "She used to be the queen of the romantic dilemmas, but lately, she's been a little dopey, what with the endless 'McDreamy' soliloquies." The development of the character has received praise from critics. Reviewing the first part of the eighth season, TV Fanatic wrote: "this season belongs to Meredith Grey. She is the heart and soul of the show and has been outstanding. This is a character that used to be so dark and twisty and has now grown into a more mature woman. Ellen Pompeo has been at the top of her game this season." Rick Porter reviewing the episode "How to Save a Life" from the 11th season for Zap2it wrote, "Without Meredith, and without one of Pompeo's strongest performances in her long time on the show, 'How to Save a Life' would have run the risk of coming across as a baldly manipulative death episode, the likes of which the show has done several times before. He added "'How to Save a Life' may not be the ideal Emmy-submission episode for Ellen Pompeo, considering Meredith is off screen for more than half of it. But it's among the best work she's ever done on the show." Janalen Samson of BuddyTV lauded the Meredith's development throughout the series, saying "When one considers how this character has grown over eleven seasons, it really is amazing. Kudos to Ellen Pompeo for her fine work. She's actually done the impossible, because I actually care what happens to Meredith Grey." Reviewing the season 12 premiere, "Sledgehammer", critics including Alex Hawkins of the Western Gazette again highlighted Pompeo's being due for an Emmy Award.

The majority of the supporting cast of Grey's Anatomy have also received mixed opinions, with the New York Post's Rorke deeming Stevens to be "the heart-and-soul" of Grey's Anatomy, whereas Eyder Peralta of the Houston Chronicle was critical of her character development, stating: "[She's] the reason I don't watch Grey's Anatomy anymore." Kelli Catana of The Huffington Post named Yang "the best damn character" and deemed "the Grey/Yang relationship the most true friendship on network television." Television Without Pity writer Lauren Shotwell claimed Yang is "the only one of these five [residents] that regularly acts like an actual doctor". Analyzing Alex Karev, Rachel Simon called him "underrated", and she pointed out that his personal growth never seems to get acknowledged, as "Alex has evolved, slowly and realistically, into a genuinely good person whose faults don't miraculously disappear, but take a backseat to much better qualities." Robert Bianco of USA Today said Dempsey has a "seemingly effortless way of humanizing Derek's 'dreamy' appeal with ego and vanity". His friendship with Mark Sloan has been well received. Victor Balta said "they've demonstrated an easy chemistry that makes for some of the great comic relief around Seattle Grace Hospital." Addison Montgomery was deemed "sassy and bright and interesting." TV Guide said of Walsh's stint on Grey's Anatomy that she "adds spice to an already hot show." Callie Torres, after having previously received mixed reviews, was praised for her bisexual storyline. Critics added that the character was anchored by stellar performances by Sara Ramirez. Lexie Grey, having initially been criticized, became a critics' favorite in the series. Alex Keen of The Trades wrote that Lexie's "presence and confidence have increased quite a bit ... and actress, Chyler Leigh, does a fantastic job of making this progression feel seamless. Since the series has defused the tension between Little Grey and Big Grey (aka Meredith), Lexie has clear sailing through the season and steals the show as one of the best current characters on the series."

With the departure of several cast members throughout the seasons, many new characters have been added to the drama's ensemble. McKidd and Capshaw were referred to as "fresh additions" to the series, by Monfette of IGN. Matt Roush of TV Guide commented: "Hunt is the most encouraging thing to happen to Grey's Anatomy in quite a while." Matt Mitovich of TV Guide noted that Robbins "quickly established herself as a fan favorite", describing her as "a breath of fresh air in the often-angsty halls of Seattle Grace. On April Kepner and Jackson Avery, Courtney Morrison of TVFanatic wrote, "April has grown since her character was introduced ... she's honest. A girl with principles is a girl you want to do well." He described her and Avery as "a couple for whom viewers can root". Speaking of the new cast members, in addition to the remaining original ones, Robert Bianco from USA Today called them the show's "best ensemble in years".

Regarding season 3, Bill Carter of The New York Times called Grey's Anatomy "television's hottest show", adding: "[No show] is expected to challenge Grey's Anatomy for prime-time pre-eminence." Contrasting with Carter's view, Monfette of IGN said that it speedily found itself "mired in the annoying and absurd", adding: "This third season may very well represent a case of over-writing a concept that has, perhaps tragically, run bone-dry on narrative fuel." At the conclusion of season 3, Entertainment Weekly's Gregory Kirschling said "the show lacked a defining happy, warm-gooseflesh moment", adding that the season "didn't leave you dying for the [next] season premiere". Speaking of the fourth season, Laura Burrows of IGN said the series became "a little more than mediocre, but less than fantastic", adding: "This season proved that even strong chemistry and good acting cannot save a show that suffers from the inevitable recycled plot."

In contrast to the moderately negative feedback the third and fourth seasons received, Alan Sepinwall of The Star-Ledger said of the fifth season: "Overall, it feels more like the good old days than Grey's Anatomy has in a long time." Misha Davenport from the Chicago Sun-Times said season 5 "hits on all the things the show does so well", adding: "There is romance, heartbreak, humor and a few moments that will move fans to tears." Brian Lowry of Variety, less impressed, opinionated that the season 5 displayed the show running out of storylines. Speaking of the sixth season, Bianco of USA Today wrote: "Grey's has always loved grand gestures. You like them or you don't; the only real question is whether the show pulls them off or it doesn't. This year, it did."

The series has a score of 66 out of 100 on Metacritic, based on five reviews for season 7. In response to the season, Bianco from USA Today commented: "Happily, it now seems to have landed on solid ground." Also of the seventh season, Entertainment Weekly's Jennifer Armstrong said: "It's in the shooting's emotional reverberations that the show is regenerating after the past few hit-and-miss seasons," whereas Verne Gay of Newsday commented: "Unfortunately, they've settled on far-too-easy and facile answers for the most part." HitFix gave a positive review saying that, "season 7 overall has been one of the show's strongest ever." and added, "There was a time when Grey's Anatomy was this show where I suffered through a lot of stuff that made me cringe to get to those genius melodrama moments it could do so well. Over the last couple of years, it's evolved into a show that's much more consistent in tone, where it may not move me as often as it did in the early years but also very rarely makes me question my reasons for watching." Speaking of season 8, Entertainment Weekly's Mandi Bierly called it a "so-so season", and Lesley Goldberg of The Hollywood Reporter called it "emotional". Also acknowledging the fan base, Verne Gay of Newsday wrote "Grey's has had a good season and has an intensely loyal fan base to prove it" regarding the eighth season.

The ninth season received positive reviews, with Rob Salem of Toronto Star calling it "a solid return to form." Praising the friendship between Meredith and Cristina of Entertainment Weekly wrote, "There's still one good reason to keep watching: Where else can you find such deep friendships between female co-workers". The tenth season was also marked with praise, with Annie Barrett for Entertainment Weekly writing "There's true sorrow here along with the passion, which keeps their dynamic so intriguing to me." Caroline Siede from The A.V. Club wrote in her review for the tenth season "At its best, Grey's Anatomy is about everyday bravery, sacrifice, and courage. At its worst, it's a melodramatic, moralizing soap opera. Both sides are on display as the show heads confidently into its 10th season." Many sources, including Rachel Simon of Bustle and Nicole Pomarico of Wetpaint, claimed that Sandra Oh's performance during her final season on Grey's Anatomy is worthy of an Emmy nomination.

Bryce Olin of Netflix Life ranked Grey's 9th among the 50 Best TV Shows on Netflix stating, "It's a tough call, but based on Grey's casting choices and revolutionary portrayals of female doctors in the series, I'm willing to argue that Grey's Anatomy is the best medical drama of all time. Obviously, Shonda Rhimes didn't reinvent the wheel with the series, but there's no denying its popularity." adding, "I understand its significance in the pop culture sphere." He also stated that the show could go higher in the ranks with the upcoming season stating, "Apparently, Grey's Anatomy fans are passionate about their show, although it seems like they've been closeted for the last few years. I'd love to move Grey's Anatomy even higher on the ranking, but I'll have wait until the eleventh season comes to Netflix."

The show was criticized for its handling of a controversy: the Grey's Anatomy scandal revolved around actor Isaiah Washington using a homophobic slur on set. Mainstream media coverage scapegoated this scandal as "black masculinity for perpetrating homophobia, thus containing both sexual and racial difference in the name of tolerance."

==== Critics' top 10 lists ====
Critics included Grey's Anatomy in top ten lists for five of its 14 seasons; these are listed below in order of rank.

2005
- No. 4 USA Today
- No. 6 The New York Times
- No. 7 The Boston Globe
- No. 9 San Jose Mercury News
- – Chicago Tribune^{[d]}

2006
- No. 2 USA Today
- No. 2 San Jose Mercury News
- No. 4 TV Guide
- No. 9 Orlando Sentinel

2007
- No. 6 USA Today

2010
- No. 10 Movieline

2015
- No. 7 NPR

=== Impact ===
Grey's Anatomy makes an impact on how people's perception of the world is created.

— Brian Quick, University of Illinois

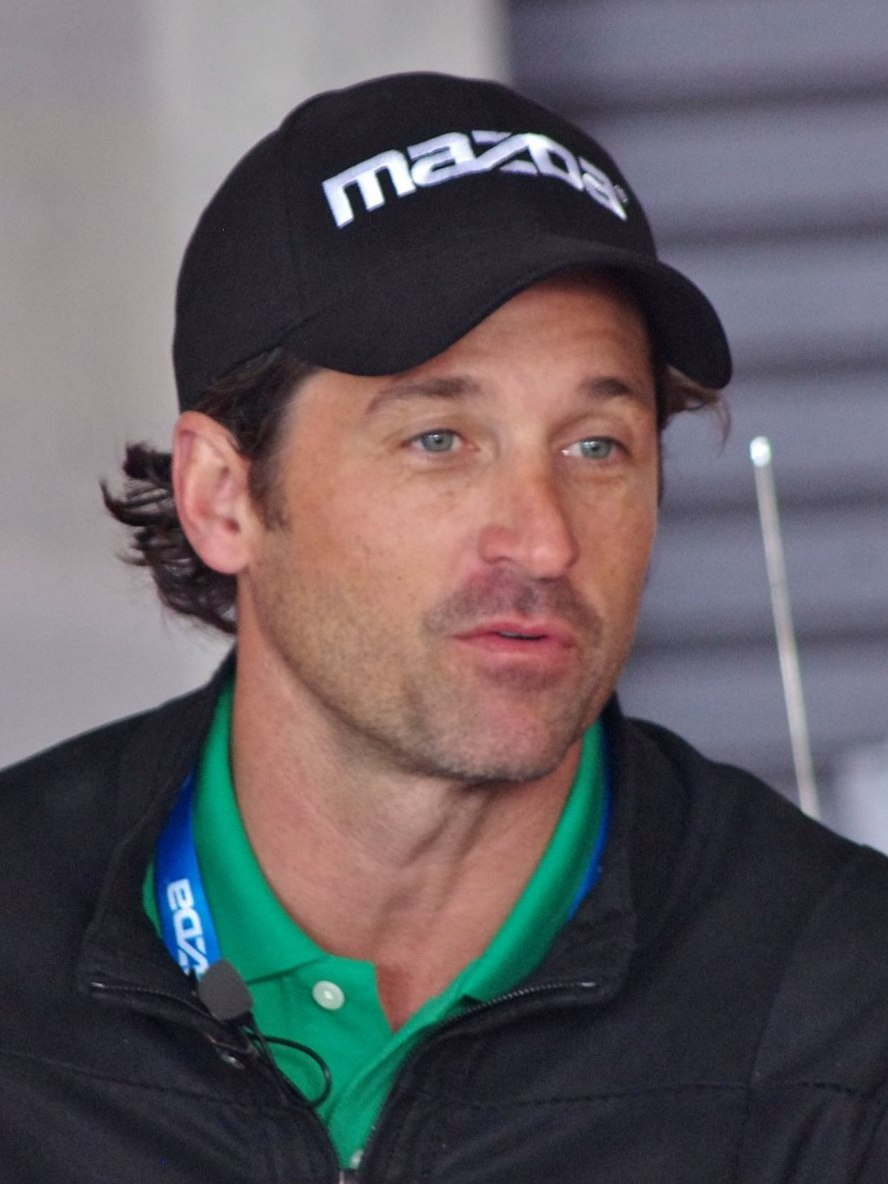
Grey's Anatomy introduced the "Mc-labeling" surge when it dubbed Patrick Dempsey's character, Derek Shepherd, "McDreamy".

Grey's Anatomy has been recognized for its significant influence on popular culture. Entertainment Weekly's executive editor, Lori Majewski, remarked, "Grey's Anatomy isn't just a show, it's a phenomenon. When [the] final shows air, every place in New York City is empty. You could get a table at the best restaurants." Similarly, Jace Lacob of The Daily Beast compared its success to that of Friends, calling it a "cultural phenomenon". Media analyst Steve Sternberg of Magna Global USA explained the show's broad appeal, noting that "roughly 80 percent of households during prime time only have one TV set on. People are looking for shows they can watch with other household members."

In its early seasons, Grey's Anatomy introduced the trend of "Mc-labeling", beginning with the character Derek Shepherd being dubbed "McDreamy". This trend became so pervasive that The National Post labeled it a "phenomenon". It was later parodied on shows like ER and Degrassi: The Next Generation. Mark Lawson of The Guardian credited Grey's Anatomy with popularizing the "songtage", or musical montage segments. This trend was parodied by Mad TV in 2006, which spoofed the show's emotional moments and musical montages.

The series has also been praised for redefining what is considered "good" television. The A.V. Club writes, "Since The Sopranos burst onto the scene, we've too often classified a show as 'good' based on how closely it adhered to the dark, violent, male-centric template set out by that particular show. It's time for that to end. At its best, Grey's Anatomy has been among the very best shows on TV, and at its worst, it's been at least fascinating to watch. TV is at its best when it emotionally connects, and even when it seems to be otherwise merrily hurtling off a cliff, Grey's Anatomy is nothing but emotional connection."

The show was ranked No. 66 on Entertainment Weekly's "New TV Classics" list in 2007 and was declared the third-highest rated show on IMDb for the first ten years of the platform (2002–2012). The premise of Grey's Anatomy inspired the creation of A corazón abierto, a Colombian adaptation, which in turn spawned a Mexican version of the same name.

A study conducted by Brian Quick from the University of Illinois suggested that the show's portrayal of doctors as "smart, good looking, capable, and interesting" led viewers to associate real-world doctors with those traits. However, Dr. Karen Zink, a surgical resident, deemed the show's portrayal of interns unrealistic, commenting, "None of [the characters] have bags under their eyes. They all leave the hospital dressed cute, with their hair done and makeup on. That is so far away from the reality of interns."

News reports have credited the series with helping viewers respond to medical emergencies. In 2011, a woman in Sheboygan, Wisconsin survived an asthma attack after her daughter and a friend performed cardiopulmonary resuscitation (CPR) they learned from Grey's Anatomy. In 2017, an Israeli woman saved her husband by performing cardiac massage she learned from the show. She continued the procedure for 20 minutes until paramedics arrived and transferred the husband to Shaare Zedek Medical Center.

In the 14th season, the episode titled "1-800-799-7233", named after the National Domestic Violence Hotline, was well received by audiences, who used social media to raise awareness about domestic violence and the hotline itself.

=== U.S. television ratings ===
Grey's Anatomy has received high viewership and ratings since its debut. The first 4 seasons of the program each ranked in the top 10 among all viewers, reaching its peak Nielsen ratings in the second season, attracting an average of 19.44 million viewers per episode, and ranking at #5 overall. Following the show's time-slot being relocated, overall rankings steadily declined, dropping below the top 10 in its fifth season. Grey's Anatomy made its greatest fall from its sixth to seventh season, slipping from #16 to #31. The series is on a steady decline in terms of overall viewership and rankings, yet Grey's Anatomy still holds value in charts when numbers are pulled from the digital video recorder (DVR). It was the most recorded show between 2007 and 2011, based on cumulative totals, and has been for several years in a row.

The most-watched episode of the series is "It's the End of the World", with 37.88 million viewers, aided by a lead-in from Super Bowl XL. Grey's Anatomy was the most expensive program on television in the 2007–08 season measured by advertising revenue, with earnings of US$400,000 per 30 seconds. The show was named the fourth (behind Desperate Housewives, Two and a Half Men, and American Idol), and the fifth-highest (behind Glee, Two and a Half Men, The X Factor and American Idol) revenue-earning show, with the earnings of US$2.67 million and US$2.75 million per half hour in 2011 and 2012 respectively. While Grey's Anatomy is no longer ranked in the top numbers for overall ratings, the show's ranking in the key 18–49 demographic has remained high. As of season 8, the series is the highest-rated drama on television in the target demographic. In 2016, a New York Times study of the 50 TV shows with the most Facebook Likes found that Grey's Anatomy was "most popular in a swath of the middle of the country, particularly in areas with a lower percentage of college graduates".

Below is a table of Grey's Anatomy's seasonal rankings in the U.S. television market, based on average total viewers per episode. Each U.S. network television season starts in September and ends in late May, which coincides with the completion of May sweeps.

Viewership and ratings per season of Grey's Anatomy
Season	Timeslot (ET)	Episodes	First aired		Last aired		TV season	Viewership rank	Avg. viewers (millions)	18–49 rank
Season	Timeslot (ET)	Episodes	Date	Viewers (millions)	Date	Viewers (millions)	TV season	Viewership rank	Avg. viewers (millions)	18–49 rank
1	Sunday 10:00 p.m.	9	March 27, 2005	16.25	May 22, 2005	22.22	2004–05	9	18.46	5
2	Sunday 10:00 p.m. (1–25); Monday 9:00 p.m. (26–27)	27	September 25, 2005	18.98	May 15, 2006	22.50	2005–06	5	19.44	4
3	Thursday 9:00 p.m.	25	September 21, 2006	25.41	May 17, 2007	22.57	2006–07	8	19.17	3
4	Thursday 9:00 p.m.	17	September 27, 2007	20.93	May 22, 2008	18.09	2007–08	10	15.92	3
5	Thursday 9:00 p.m.	24	September 25, 2008	18.47	May 14, 2009	16.53	2008–09	12	14.52	3
6	Thursday 9:00 p.m.	24	September 24, 2009	17.03	May 20, 2010	15.24	2009–10	16	13.55	6
7	Thursday 9:00 p.m.	22	September 23, 2010	14.32	May 19, 2011	9.89	2010–11	31	11.41	9
8	Thursday 9:00 p.m.	24	September 22, 2011	10.38	May 17, 2012	11.44	2011–12	32	10.92	10
9	Thursday 9:00 p.m.	24	September 27, 2012	11.73	May 16, 2013	8.99	2012–13	26	11.07	10
10	Thursday 9:00 p.m.	24	September 26, 2013	9.27	May 15, 2014	8.92	2013–14	15	12.12	5
11	Thursday 8:00 p.m.	25	September 25, 2014	9.81	May 14, 2015	8.33	2014–15	31	11.57	13
12	Thursday 8:00 p.m.	24	September 24, 2015	9.55	May 19, 2016	8.19	2015–16	21	11.20	8
13	Thursday 8:00 p.m.	24	September 22, 2016	8.75	May 18, 2017	7.92	2016–17	19	10.88	9
14	Thursday 8:00 p.m.	24	September 28, 2017	8.07	May 17, 2018	7.60	2017–18	20	10.83	11
15	Thursday 8:00 p.m.	25	September 27, 2018	6.81	May 16, 2019	5.99	2018–19	27	9.87	8
16	Thursday 8:00 p.m. (1–9); Thursday 9:00 p.m. (10–21)	21	September 26, 2019	6.51	April 9, 2020	7.33	2019–20	22	9.39	6
17	Thursday 9:00 p.m.	17	November 12, 2020	5.93	June 3, 2021	4.76	2020–21	19	8.16	5
18	Thursday 9:00 p.m.	20	September 30, 2021	4.77	May 26, 2022	4.19	2021–22	34	6.42	8
19	Thursday 9:00 p.m.	20	October 6, 2022	3.80	May 11, 2023	3.02	2022–23	42	5.21	16
20	Thursday 9:00 p.m.	10	March 14, 2024	3.62	May 30, 2024	3.48	2023–24	42	4.90	14
21	Thursday 10:00 p.m.	18	September 26, 2024	2.70	May 15, 2025	2.28	2024–25	76	6.90	15
22	Thursday 10:00 p.m.	18	October 9, 2025	2.60	TBA	TBD	2025–26	TBD	TBD	TBD

=== Accolades ===
Grey's Anatomy has received numerous awards and nominations since its inception. The show has been nominated for 39 Primetime Emmy Awards, having been nominated for at least one every year until 2013. At the 57th Primetime Emmy Awards in 2005, Oh was nominated for Outstanding Supporting Actress in a Drama Series, which she went on to be nominated for every year until 2009, and Horton was nominated for Outstanding Directing for a Drama Series. The following year, at the 58th Primetime Emmy Awards, the series received a nomination for Outstanding Drama Series, which they were nominated for again in 2007. Also in 2006, Wilson was nominated for Outstanding Supporting Actress in a Drama Series, which she went on to be nominated for every year until 2009, and Kyle Chandler was nominated for Outstanding Guest Actor in a Drama Series. The 58th ceremony also honored Rhimes and Vernoff, who were both nominated for Outstanding Writing for a Drama Series. Rhimes, whose career kicked off in 1995, has since produced yet another ABC series, Scandal, which began on air in 2012 and ended in 2019. Beginning in 2005, Rhimes has been continually nominated for numerous awards, including 3 Emmy Awards: first in 2006 for a dramatic series and a separate nomination for writing a dramatic series, followed by a third nomination in 2007 for a dramatic series.

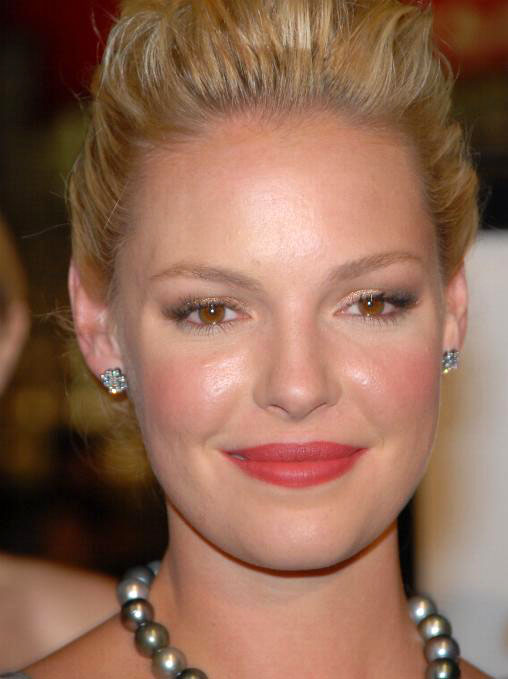
Katherine Heigl is the only star-billed cast member to have received a Primetime Emmy Award

In 2007, at the 59th Primetime Emmy Awards, Heigl won the award for Outstanding Supporting Actress in a Drama Series, while Knight was nominated for Outstanding Supporting Actor in a Drama Series. Numerous guest actresses have been nominated for Outstanding Guest Actress in a Drama Series, including Burton in 2006 and 2007, Christina Ricci in 2006, Reaser in 2007, Diahann Carroll in 2008, and Sharon Lawrence in 2009, but the only actress to have won the award is Devine in 2011, who was nominated again in 2012. The show has also been nominated for 13 Creative Arts Emmy Awards, having won 2 of them: Outstanding Casting for a Drama Series and Outstanding Makeup for a Single-Camera Series (Non-Prosthetic)

The show has received 10 Golden Globe Award nominations since its premiere. At the 63rd Golden Globe Awards, in 2006, the series was nominated for Best Drama Series, Dempsey was nominated for Best Actor in a Drama Series, which he was nominated for again in 2007, and Oh won the award for Best Supporting Actress in a Series, Miniseries, or Television Film. The following year, at the 64th Golden Globe Awards, in 2007, Pompeo was nominated for Best Actress in a Drama Series, and the show won Best Drama Series. At the 65th Golden Globe Awards, in 2008, Heigl was nominated for Best Supporting Actress in a Series, Miniseries, or Television Film, while the series in whole was nominated for Best Drama Series.

The series has won People's Choice Awards for Best Drama 7 times in 2007, 2013, 2015, 2016, 2017, 2021, and 2022 and has been nominated for several other People's Choice Awards, with nominations received by Oh as well as multiple wins from Dempsey, Pompeo winning in recent years 2013 and 2015, Heigl, Wilson, Demi Lovato, for guest starring, and the drama in whole for Favorite TV Drama. In 2007, Rhimes and the female cast were the recipient of the Women in Film Lucy Award, in recognition of the excellence and innovation in the show as a creative work that has enhanced the perception of women through the medium of television. The series has been honored with numerous NAACP Image Award nominations, many having been won, including 5 awards for Outstanding Drama Series. Grey's Anatomy has also received several Screen Actors Guild Awards, with nominations received by Dempsey, as well as wins from Oh, Wilson, and the main cast for Outstanding Performance by an Ensemble in a Drama Series. The series won a GLAAD Media Award for Outstanding Drama Series in 2012, and has received nominations for 8 consecutive years from 2010 to 2017, 2019, 2022, 2023, 2024.

== Spin-offs and adaptations ==
Grey's Anatomy has spawned several spin-offs and adaptations.

=== Private Practice ===
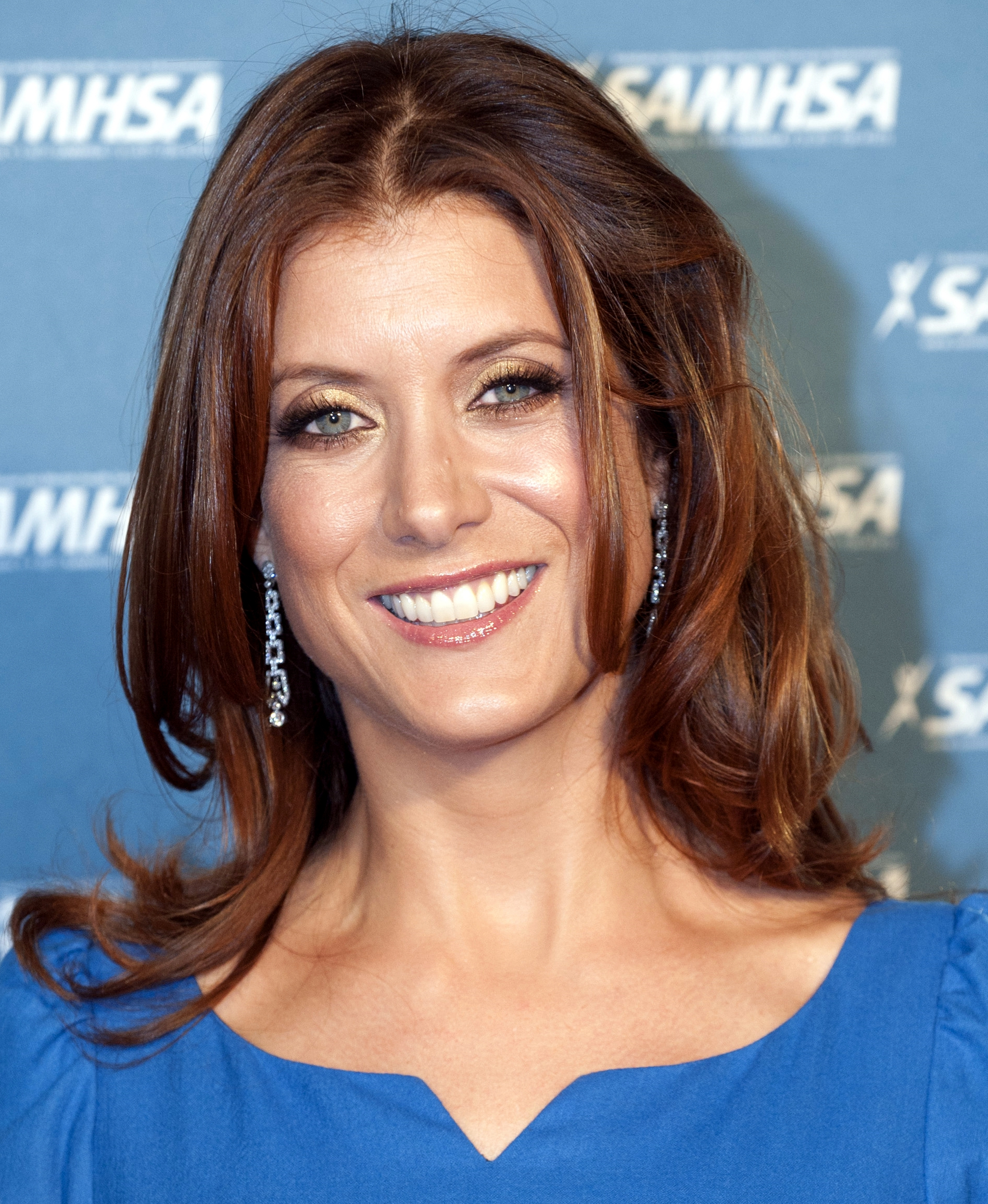
The cast of Grey's Anatomy was displeased with the network's decision to center the spin-off on Kate Walsh's character.

On February 21, 2007, The Wall Street Journal reported that ABC was pursuing a spin-off medical drama television series for Grey's Anatomy featuring Walsh's character, Addison Montgomery. Subsequent reports confirmed the decision, stating that an expanded two-hour broadcast of Grey's Anatomy would serve as a backdoor pilot for the proposed spin-off. The cast of Grey's Anatomy was reportedly unhappy about the decision, as all hoped the spin-off would have been given to them. Pompeo commented that she felt, as the star, she should have been consulted, and Heigl disclosed that she had hoped for a spin-off for Stevens. The backdoor pilot that aired on May 3, 2007, sees Montgomery take a leave of absence from Seattle Grace Hospital, to visit her best-friend from Los Angeles, Naomi Bennett (Merrin Dungey, later Audra McDonald), a reproductive endocrinology and infertility specialist. While in Los Angeles, she meets Bennett's colleagues at the Oceanside Wellness Center. The two-hour broadcast entitled "The Other Side of This Life" served as the twenty-second and twenty-third episodes of the third season, and was directed by Michael Grossman, according to Variety. The cast included Amy Brenneman, Paul Adelstein, Tim Daly, Taye Diggs, Chris Lowell, and Merrin Dungey.

KaDee Strickland's character, Charlotte King, who would be introduced in the spin-off's first-season premiere, did not appear in the backdoor pilot. Her addition to the main cast was announced on July 11, 2007, prior to the commencement of the first season. She did not have to audition for the role, but was cast after a meeting with Rhimes. Also not present in the backdoor pilot was McDonald, due to her character, Naomi Bennett, being portrayed by a different actress, Merrin Dungey. However, on June 29, 2007, ABC announced that Dungey would be replaced, with no reason given for the change. The drama was titled Private Practice, and its premiere episode followed the second part of the season debut of Dancing with the Stars, and provided a lead-in to fellow freshman series Dirty Sexy Money. Pushing Daisies, a third new series for the evening, rounded out the lineup as a lead-in to Private Practice. The series ended its run on January 22, 2013, after 6 seasons.

=== Station 19 ===
On May 16, 2017, Channing Dungey announced at the ABC Upfronts that the network ordered another Grey's Anatomy spin-off, this one focusing on firefighters in Seattle. The series premiered mid-season in 2018. Stacy McKee, long-term Grey's writer and executive producer, serves as the spin-off's showrunner. The new show was introduced Season 14, Episode 13, when a house fire brings the firefighters to Grey Sloan Memorial Hospital. In July 2017, it was announced that Jaina Lee Ortiz was the first actress cast in the spin-off series. In September 2017, it was announced that Jason George, who has played Dr. Ben Warren since season 6, would be leaving Grey's Anatomy to move to the spin-off. He continued to be a series regular on Grey's Anatomy until the spin-off began production. In October 2017, it was announced that 5 new series regulars for the spin-off had been cast being Grey Damon, Jay Hayden, Okieriete Onaodowan, Danielle Savre and Barrett Doss. It was also announced that the spin-off had a 10-episode order for the first season. Later in October 2017, it was announced that Miguel Sandoval was cast as the Captain of the firehouse.

=== Grey's Anatomy: B-Team ===
On January 9, 2018, it was announced by Sarah Drew on her Instagram page that a 6-episode spin-off series following the new interns of Grey Sloan Memorial would be released for streaming on the ABC app and abc.com on Thursday, January 11, 2018. Grey's Anatomy: B-Team stars Sophia Taylor Ali (Dahlia Qadri), Jake Borelli (Levi Schmitt), Alex Blue Davis (Casey Parker), Jaicy Elliot (Taryn Helm), Rushi Kota (Vik Roy) and Jeanine Mason (Samantha "Sam" Bello) with special guest appearances made by Justin Chambers (Alex Karev), Kelly McCreary (Maggie Pierce), Kevin McKidd (Owen Hunt) and James Pickens Jr. (Richard Webber). The 6 episodes in this series were written by Barbara Kaye Friend with Grey's Anatomy series regular Sarah Drew (April Kepner) making her directorial debut directing each of them.

=== Untitled West Texas spin-off ===
On May 19, 2026, ABC ordered a new spin-off that will be set in Texas. It is slated to premiere in 2027-28 season. In November 2026, Karla Souza was cast as Dr. Carolina “Lina” Hall.

=== Crossovers ===
Grey's Anatomy has several crossover storylines with both spin-offs Private Practice and Station 19 throughout its run.

List of Grey's Anatomy crossover events
Series A	Episode title	Series B	Episode title	Air date	Crossover type
Grey's Anatomy	"The Other Side of This Life"	Private Practice	"The Other Side of This Life"	May 3, 2007	Backdoor pilot
Grey's Anatomy	"Before and After"	Private Practice	"Ex-Life"	February 12, 2009	Two-part event
Grey's Anatomy	"Blink"	Private Practice	"Another Second Chance"	January 14, 2010	Two-part event
Grey's Anatomy	"Have You Seen Me Lately?"	Private Practice	"You Break My Heart"	February 16, 2012	Two-part event
Grey's Anatomy	"You Really Got a Hold on Me"	Station 19	"You Really Got a Hold on Me"	March 1, 2018	Backdoor pilot
Grey's Anatomy	"Momma Knows Best"	Station 19	"Under the Surface"	October 11, 2018	Two-part event
Grey's Anatomy	"What I Did for Love"	Station 19	"Always Ready"	May 2, 2019	Two-part event
Station 19	"I Know This Bar"	Grey's Anatomy	"Help Me Through the Night"	January 23, 2020	Two-part event
Station 19	"Nothing Seems the Same"	Grey's Anatomy	"All Tomorrow's Parties"	November 12, 2020	Three-part event
Station 19	"Nothing Seems the Same"	Grey's Anatomy	"The Center Won't Hold"	November 12, 2020	Three-part event
Station 19	"Out of Control"	Grey's Anatomy	"No Time for Despair"	December 17, 2020	Four-part event
Station 19	"Train in Vain"	Grey's Anatomy	"Helplessly Hoping"	March 11, 2021	Four-part event
Station 19	"Save Yourself"	Grey's Anatomy	"Sorry Doesn't Always Make It Right"	April 8, 2021	Two-part event
Station 19	"Phoenix from the Flame"	Grey's Anatomy	"Here Comes the Sun"	September 30, 2021	Two-part event
Station 19	"Things We Lost in the Fire"	Grey's Anatomy	"Bottle Up and Explode!"	November 11, 2021	Two-part event
Station 19	"Started from the Bottom"	Grey's Anatomy	"No Time to Die"	February 24, 2022	Two-part event
Station 19	"Everybody Says Don't"	Grey's Anatomy	"Thunderstruck"	November 10, 2022	Two-part event
Station 19	"How Am I Supposed to Live Without You"	Grey's Anatomy		May 23, 2024	Three-part event.
Station 19	"One Last Time"	Grey's Anatomy	"Burn It Down"	May 30, 2024	Three-part event.

=== International adaptations ===
In 2006, Doktorlar ("Doctors"), an adaptation of the series, was made by the Turkish network Show TV. It aired for 4 seasons.

In 2010, A Corazón Abierto ("An Open Heart"), an adaptation of the series, was made by the Colombian network RCN TV. It aired for 2 seasons.

In 2011, A Corazón Abierto ("An Open Heart"), an adaptation of the series, was made by the Mexican network TV Azteca. It aired for 2 seasons.

== Merchandise ==
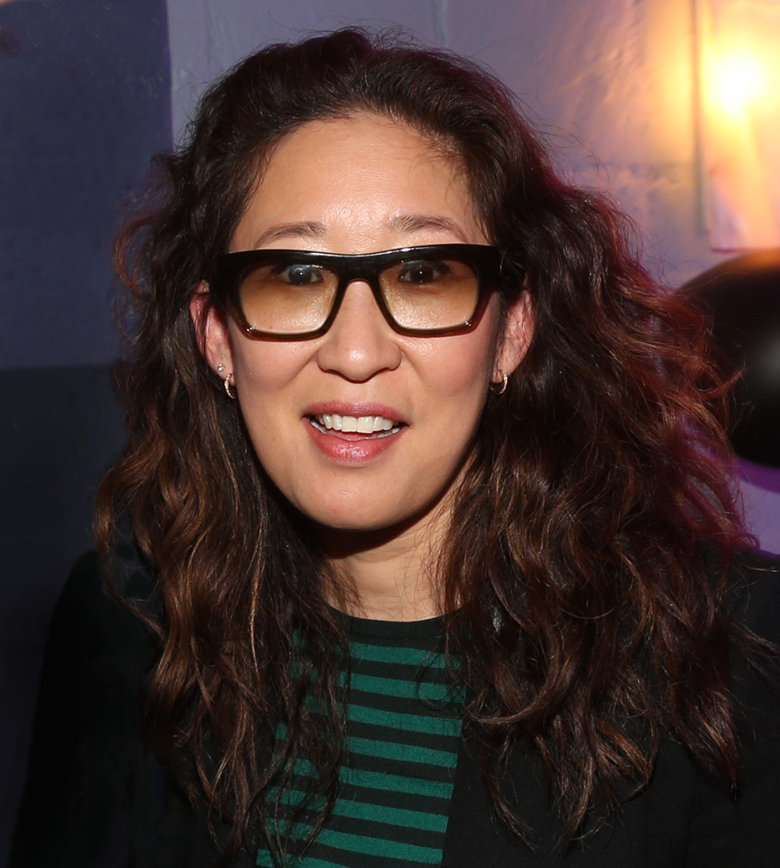
Grey's Anatomy: The Video Game includes a plot focused around Cristina Yang, Sandra Oh's character.

The American Broadcasting Company has partnered with J. Larson CafePress and Barco Uniforms to provide the series' branded merchandise through an online store. The products available include shirts, sweatshirts, kitchenware, homeware, and bags, with the Grey's Anatomy logo on it.^{[e]} Also available are custom unisex scrubs and lab coats in a variety of colors and sizes, designed by Barco. The merchandise released by the company is available for purchase at the Grey's Anatomy official website, and US$1 from every purchase is donated to Barco's Nightingales Foundation.

Five volumes of the Grey's Anatomy Original Soundtrack have been released as of 2011. For the first 2 seasons, the show's main title theme was an excerpt from "Cosy in the Rocket", by British duo Psapp; it is featured on the first soundtrack album released via ABC's corporate cousin, Hollywood Records, on September 27, 2005. The second soundtrack, featuring songs from the series' second season, was released on September 12, 2006, followed by a third soundtrack with music from the third season. Following the seventh season musical episode "Song Beneath the Song", "Grey's Anatomy: The Music Event" soundtrack was released, with volume 4 of the soundtrack released subsequently.

In January 2009, Ubisoft announced that it had signed a licensing agreement with ABC Studios to develop a video game based on Grey's Anatomy. Designed for the Wii, Nintendo DS and PC, Grey's Anatomy: The Video Game was released on March 10, 2009. The game lets the player assume the role of one of the main characters, making decisions for the character's personal and professional life, and competing in a number of minigames. It has been criticized by reviewers because of the simplicity of the mini-games and voice actors who do not play the same characters on the series, with Jason Ocampo of IGN giving it a 6/10 overall rating. The Wii release received mixed reviews, and the Windows release received generally unfavorable reviews.

ABC and Nielsen partnered in 2011 to create a Grey's Anatomy application for Apple's iPad. The application was designed to allow viewers to participate in polls and learn trivial facts as they watch a live episode. It uses Nielsen's Media-Sync software to listen for the episode and to post features as the episode progresses.

The creators of the show set up a real online wedding registry to mark the wedding of Meredith Grey and Derek Shepherd. Instead of buying gifts fans were encouraged to donate money to the American Academy of Neurology Foundation.

== Explanatory footnotes ==
- ^{a} Pompeo starred as the leading role in Moonlight Mile, which explains the significance of her being cast as Meredith.
- ^{b} The character of O'Malley failed his intern test, which is why he was not initially a resident along with Meredith, Yang, Stevens and Karev.
- ^{c} Meredith and Shepherd had decided to adopt, due to Meredith's infertility, which was diagnosed in season 7.
- ^{d} The Chicago Tribune list is not ranked—it consists of 10 shows in alphabetical order.
- ^{e} The Grey's Anatomy logo can be seen in the infobox, above.
