= List of Private Practice episodes =

Episodes of American medical drama

Private Practice logo

Private Practice is an American medical drama series created by Shonda Rhimes and broadcast by the American Broadcasting Company (ABC). It is a spin-off from the long-running series Grey's Anatomy, another ABC medical drama created by Rhimes. The basic premise of the program was first introduced during the third season of Grey's Anatomy through a two-part backdoor pilot titled "The Other Side of This Life". The series premiered with a nine-episode first season on September 26, 2007. Four additional seasons followed between 2008 and 2012. A sixth and final season was then announced, for which the network opted not to order a back nine, concluding the thirteen-episode season and 111-episode series on January 22, 2013.

The series follows Dr. Addison Montgomery (portrayed by Kate Walsh) as she relocates from the fictional Seattle Grace Hospital in Seattle, Washington, and takes a job at the Oceanside Wellness Group, a private medical practice in Santa Monica, California. Walsh was first introduced in the first season finale of Grey's Anatomy and then starred in the second and third seasons before moving to the spin-off. The initial ensemble cast also featured Tim Daly, Audra McDonald (taking on a role that was portrayed by Merrin Dungey in the backdoor pilot), Paul Adelstein, KaDee Strickland, Chris Lowell, Taye Diggs, and Amy Brenneman. Daly, McDonald, and Lowell left the series during its run, while other cast members, such as Brian Benben, Caterina Scorsone, Benjamin Bratt, and Griffin Gluck, were introduced in later seasons.

Private Practice featured several crossover episodes with Grey's Anatomy over the course of its run. It is the first spin-off of that show, which began in 2005, the second being Station 19 (2018–2024). It was the second series from Shondaland, Rhimes' production company, and one of twelve that has been produced by the company overall. Following the conclusion of the program, both Walsh and Scorsone (portraying Amelia Shepherd) reprised their roles as recurring guest stars in Grey's Anatomy; Scorsone was later promoted to the main cast of that series beginning with the eleventh season, and also crossed over into Station 19. The series was broadcast internationally.

== Series overview ==
Private Practice series overview
Season	Episodes	Originally released		Average US viewership (in millions)
Season	Episodes	First released	Last released	Average US viewership (in millions)
Pilot	2	May 3, 2007		21.23
1	9	September 26, 2007	December 5, 2007	11.53 (Note: Multiple references; for the first season, see: Episode 1: Episode 2: Episode 3: Episode 4: Episode 5: Episode 6: Episode 7: Episode 8: Episode 9:)
2	22	October 1, 2008	April 30, 2009	8.89 (Note: Multiple references; for the second season, see: Episode 1: Episode 2: Episode 3: Episode 4: Episode 5: Episode 6: Episode 7: Episode 8: Episode 9: Episode 10: Episode 11: Episode 12: Episode 13: Episode 14: Episode 15: Episode 16: Episode 17: Episode 18: Episode 19: Episode 20: Episode 21: Episode 22:)
3	23	October 1, 2009	May 13, 2010	9.05 (Note: Multiple references; for the third season, see: Episode 1: Episode 2: Episode 3: Episode 4: Episode 5: Episode 6: Episode 7: Episode 8: Episodes 9 and 10: Episode 11: Episode 12: Episode 13: Episode 14: Episode 15: Episode 16: Episode 17: Episode 18: Episode 19: Episode 20: Episode 21: Episode 22: Episode 23:)
4	22	September 23, 2010	May 19, 2011	7.59 (Note: Multiple references; for the fourth season, see: Episode 1: Episode 2: Episode 3: Episode 4: Episode 5: Episode 6: Episode 7: Episode 8: Episode 9: Episode 10: Episode 11: Episode 12: Episode 13: Episode 14: Episode 15: Episode 16: Episode 17: Episode 18: Episode 19: Episode 20: Episode 21: Episode 22:)
5	22	September 29, 2011	May 15, 2012	6.86 (Note: Multiple references; for the fifth season, see: Episode 1: Episode 2: Episode 3: Episode 4: Episode 5: Episode 6: Episode 7: Episodes 8 and 9: Episode 10: Episode 11: Episode 12: Episode 13: Episode 14: Episode 15: Episode 16: Episode 17: Episode 18: Episode 19: Episode 20: Episode 21: Episode 22:)
6	13	September 25, 2012	January 22, 2013	4.64 (Note: Multiple references; for the sixth season, see: Episode 1: Episode 2: Episode 3: Episode 4: Episode 5: Episode 6: Episode 7: Episode 8: Episode 9: Episode 10: Episode 11: Episode 12: Episode 13:)

== Episodes ==
=== Backdoor pilot (2007) ===
Private Practice backdoor pilot
No. overall	No. in season	Title	Directed by	Written by	Original release date	US viewers (millions)
58	22	"The Other Side of This Life"	Michael Grossman	Shonda Rhimes	May 3, 2007	21.23
59	23	"The Other Side of This Life"	Michael Grossman	Shonda Rhimes	May 3, 2007	21.23

=== Season 1 (2007) ===
List of Private Practice season 1 episodes
No. overall	No. in season	Title	Directed by	Written by	Original release date	US viewers (millions)
1	1	"In Which We Meet Addison, a Nice Girl From Somewhere Else"	Mark Tinker	Shonda Rhimes	September 26, 2007	14.41
2	2	"In Which Sam Receives an Unexpected Visitor"	Tony Goldwyn	Mike Ostrowski	October 3, 2007	12.45
3	3	"In Which Addison Finds the Magic"	Mark Tinker	Shonda Rhimes & Marti Noxon	October 10, 2007	12.42
4	4	"In Which Addison Has a Very Casual Get Together"	Arvin Brown	Andrea Newman	October 17, 2007	11.78
5	5	"In Which Addison Finds a Showerhead"	Julie Anne Robinson	Shonda Rhimes & Marti Noxon	October 24, 2007	11.91
6	6	"In Which Charlotte Goes Down the Rabbit Hole"	David Solomon	Jenna Bans	October 31, 2007	10.34
7	7	"In Which Sam Gets Taken For a Ride"	Jeff Melman	Emily Halpern	November 14, 2007	11.48
8	8	"In Which Cooper Finds a Port In His Storm"	Mark Tinker	Lauren Schmidt	November 21, 2007	8.54
9	9	"In Which Dell Finds His Fight"	Wendey Stanzler	Ayanna Floyd	December 5, 2007	10.40

=== Season 2 (2008–09) ===
List of Private Practice season 2 episodes
No. overall	No. in season	Title	Directed by	Written by	Original release date	US viewers (millions)
10	1	"A Family Thing"	Mark Tinker	Shonda Rhimes & Marti Noxon	October 1, 2008	8.16
11	2	"Equal and Opposite"	Tom Verica	Mike Ostrowski	October 8, 2008	7.40
12	3	"Nothing to Talk About"	Helen Shaver	Ayanna A. Floyd	October 22, 2008	7.98
13	4	"Past Tense"	Michael Pressman	Craig Turk	October 29, 2008	7.93
14	5	"Let It Go"	Michael Zinberg	Lauren Schmidt	November 5, 2008	9.17
15	6	"Serving Two Masters"	Joanna Kerns	Emily Halpern	November 19, 2008	7.23
16	7	"Tempting Faith"	James Frawley	Jon Cowan & Robert L. Rovner	November 26, 2008	6.33
17	8	"Crime and Punishment"	Mark Tinker	Shonda Rhimes	December 3, 2008	7.78
18	9	"Know When to Fold"	Jeff Melman	Elizabeth J. B. Klaviter	December 10, 2008	6.86
19	10	"Worlds Apart"	Bethany Rooney	Steve Blackman	December 17, 2008	6.61
20	11	"Contamination"	Kate Woods	Fred Einesman	January 8, 2009	8.98
21	12	"Homeward Bound"	Mark Tinker	Sal Calleros	January 15, 2009	8.49
22	13	"Nothing to Fear"	Allison Liddi-Brown	Jon Cowan & Robert Rovner	January 22, 2009	9.49
23	14	"Second Chances"	James Frawley	Craig Turk	January 29, 2009	7.74
24	15	"Acceptance"	Steve Gomer	Mike Ostrowski	February 5, 2009	12.91
25	16	"Ex-Life"	Mark Tinker	Jon Cowan, Robert Rovner, Krista Vernoff & Debora Cahn	February 12, 2009	14.10
26	17	"Wait and See"	Michael Zinberg	Steve Blackman	February 19, 2009	11.16
27	18	"Finishing"	Donna Deitch	Shonda Rhimes	March 12, 2009	8.60
28	19	"What Women Want"	Mark Tinker	Lauren Schmidt	March 19, 2009	9.74
29	20	"Do the Right Thing"	Eric Stoltz	Craig Turk	March 26, 2009	10.12
30	21	"What You Do For Love"	Tom Verica	Ayanna A. Floyd	April 23, 2009	9.08
31	22	"Yours, Mine and Ours"	Michael Zinberg	Jon Cowan & Robert Rovner	April 30, 2009	9.70

=== Season 3 (2009–10) ===
List of Private Practice season 3 episodes
No. overall	No. in season	Title	Directed by	Written by	Original release date	US viewers (millions)
32	1	"A Death in the Family"	Mark Tinker	Shonda Rhimes, Jon Cowan & Robert Rovner	October 1, 2009	11.58
33	2	"The Way We Were"	Donna Deitch	Patti Carr & Lara Olsen	October 8, 2009	9.50
34	3	"Right Here, Right Now"	Rob Corn	Dana Baratta	October 15, 2009	10.36
35	4	"Pushing the Limits"	Allison Liddi-Brown	Ayanna A. Floyd	October 22, 2009	9.93
36	5	"Strange Bedfellows"	Steve Gomer	Kathy McCormick	October 29, 2009	9.16
37	6	"Slip Slidin' Away"	Helen Shaver	Fred Einesman	November 5, 2009	9.11
38	7	"The Hard Part"	Mark Tinker	Steve Blackman	November 12, 2009	10.25
39	8	"Sins of the Father"	Tom Verica	Elizabeth J. B. Klaviter	November 19, 2009	8.93
40	9	"The Parent Trap"	Donna Deitch	Craig Turk	December 3, 2009	9.21
41	10	"Blowups"	Mark Tinker	Sonay Washington	December 3, 2009	9.21
42	11	"Another Second Chance"	Michael Zinberg	Krista Vernoff & Kathy McCormick	January 14, 2010	10.96
43	12	"Best Laid Plans"	Bethany Rooney	Patti Carr & Lara Olsen	January 21, 2010	9.64
44	13	"Shotgun"	Karen Gaviola	Jon Cowan & Robert Rovner	February 4, 2010	9.25
45	14	"Love Bites"	Matthew Penn	Dana Baratta	February 11, 2010	9.04
46	15	"Til Death Do Us Part"	Kenny Leon	Craig Turk	February 18, 2010	7.59
47	16	"Fear of Flying"	Mark Tinker	Ayanna A. Floyd	March 4, 2010	7.57
48	17	"Triangles"	Tom Verica	Steve Blackman	March 11, 2010	7.66
49	18	"Pulling the Plug"	Ann Kindberg	Kathy McCormick	March 25, 2010	8.71
50	19	"Eyes Wide Open"	Eric Stoltz	Jesse Zigelstein	April 1, 2010	7.82
51	20	"Second Choices"	Jeff Bleckner	Patti Carr & Lara Olsen	April 22, 2010	7.49
52	21	"War"	Eric Stoltz	Elizabeth J. B. Klaviter & Sonay Washington	April 29, 2010	7.78
53	22	"In the Name of Love"	Mark Tinker	Fred Einesman	May 6, 2010	8.15
54	23	"The End of a Beautiful Friendship"	Jeannot Szwarc	Debora Cahn	May 13, 2010	9.28

=== Season 4 (2010–11) ===
List of Private Practice season 4 episodes
No. overall	No. in season	Title	Directed by	Written by	Original release date	US viewers (millions)
55	1	"Take Two"	Mark Tinker	Craig Turk & Steve Blackman	September 23, 2010	8.83
56	2	"Short Cuts"	Mark Tinker	Sonay Washington	September 30, 2010	7.93
57	3	"Playing God"	Donna Deitch	Sheila Lawrence	October 7, 2010	7.90
58	4	"A Better Place to Be"	Tom Verica	Barbie Kligman	October 14, 2010	8.07
59	5	"In or Out"	Ed Ornelas	Ayanna A. Floyd	October 21, 2010	7.66
60	6	"All in the Family"	Ann Kindberg	Sanford Golden & Karen Wyscarver	October 28, 2010	7.68
61	7	"Did You Hear What Happened to Charlotte King?"	Allison Liddi-Brown	Shonda Rhimes	November 4, 2010	10.18
62	8	"What Happens Next"	Michael Zinberg	Jennifer Cecil	November 11, 2010	8.21
63	9	"Can't Find My Way Back Home"	Mark Tinker	Fred Einesman	November 18, 2010	8.01
64	10	"Just Lose It"	Stephen Cragg	Elizabeth Klaviter	December 2, 2010	7.90
65	11	"If You Don't Know Me By Now"	Eric Stoltz	Zahir McGhee	January 6, 2011	7.67
66	12	"Heaven Can Wait"	Kenny Leon	Barbie Kligman	February 3, 2011	7.05
67	13	"Blind Love"	Bethany Rooney	Craig Turk & Steve Blackman	February 10, 2011	7.26
68	14	"Home Again"	Mark Tinker	Krista Vernoff	February 17, 2011	6.73
69	15	"Two Steps Back"	Jeff Bleckner	Ayanna A. Floyd	February 24, 2011	6.44
70	16	"Love and Lies"	Ann Kindberg	Moira McMahon	March 17, 2011	5.97
71	17	"A Step Too Far"	Scott Printz	Fred Einesman	March 24, 2011	7.93
72	18	"The Hardest Part"	Paul Adelstein	Jennifer Cecil	March 31, 2011	7.35
73	19	"What We Have Here..."	Karen Gaviola	Christopher Fife	April 28, 2011	6.68
74	20	"Something Old, Something New"	Mark Tinker	Sanford Golden & Karen Wyscarver	May 5, 2011	6.89
75	21	"God Bless the Child"	Jeannot Szwarc	Jennifer Cecil & Barbie Kligman	May 12, 2011	7.27
76	22	"...To Change the Things I Can"	Mark Tinker	Craig Turk & Steve Blackman	May 19, 2011	7.45

=== Season 5 (2011–12) ===
List of Private Practice season 5 episodes
No. overall	No. in season	Title	Directed by	Written by	Original release date	US viewers (millions)
77	1	"God Laughs"	Mark Tinker	Craig Turk	September 29, 2011	7.79
78	2	"Breaking the Rules"	Tom Verica	Steve Blackman	October 6, 2011	6.06
79	3	"Deal With It"	Randy Zisk	Jennifer Cecil	October 13, 2011	6.51
80	4	"Remember Me"	Mark Tinker	Barbie Kligman	October 20, 2011	6.38
81	5	"Step One"	Ann Kindberg	Adele Lim	October 27, 2011	6.40
82	6	"If I Hadn't Forgotten..."	Jeff Bleckner	Krista Vernoff	November 3, 2011	6.56
83	7	"Don't Stop 'Till You Get Enough"	Bethany Rooney	Fred Einesman	November 10, 2011	7.51
84	8	"Who We Are"	Mark Tinker	Shonda Rhimes	November 17, 2011	7.23
85	9	"The Breaking Point"	Jeff Bleckner	Christopher Fife	November 17, 2011	7.23
86	10	"Are You My Mother?"	Ed Ornelas	Elizabeth J. B. Klaviter	January 5, 2012	7.71
87	11	"The Standing Eight Count"	Scott Printz	Zahir McGhee	January 12, 2012	6.55
88	12	"Losing Battles"	Stephen Cragg	Gabriel Llanas	January 19, 2012	6.00
89	13	"The Time Has Come"	Mark Tinker	Jennifer Cecil	February 2, 2012	6.55
90	14	"Too Much"	Karen Gaviola	Noah Evslin	February 9, 2012	6.52
91	15	"You Break My Heart"	Allison Liddi-Brown	Steve Blackman & Craig Turk	February 16, 2012	7.08
92	16	"Andromeda"	Mark Tinker	Gabe Fonseca	February 23, 2012	6.32
93	17	"The Letting Go"	Paul Adelstein	Barbie Kligman	March 15, 2012	6.85
94	18	"It Was Inevitable"	Bill Purple	Adele Lim & Christopher Fife	April 17, 2012	6.53
95	19	"And Then There Was One"	Tom Verica	Jennifer Cecil & Elizabeth J. B. Klaviter	April 24, 2012	8.13
96	20	"True Colors"	Steve Robin	Craig Turk & Steve Blackman	May 1, 2012	7.38
97	21	"Drifting Back"	Jeannot Szwarc	Gabriel Llanas & Zahir McGhee	May 8, 2012	5.77
98	22	"Gone, Baby, Gone"	Ann Kindberg	Shonda Rhimes	May 15, 2012	6.81

=== Season 6 (2012–13) ===
List of Private Practice season 6 episodes
No. overall	No. in season	Title	Directed by	Written by	Original release date	US viewers (millions)
99	1	"Aftershock"	Mark Tinker	Barbie Kligman	September 25, 2012	6.45
100	2	"Mourning Sickness"	Ed Ornelas	Jennifer Cecil	October 2, 2012	6.01
101	3	"Good Grief"	Bethany Rooney	Gabe Fonseca	October 9, 2012	6.00
102	4	"You Don't Know What You've Got Till It's Gone"	Ann Kindberg	Fred Einesman	October 23, 2012	4.58
103	5	"The Next Episode"	Jeannot Szwarc	Zahir McGhee	November 13, 2012	3.72
104	6	"Apron Strings"	Amyn Kaderali	Elizabeth J. B. Klaviter	November 20, 2012	4.24
105	7	"The World According to Jake"	Allison Liddi Brown	Christopher Fife	November 21, 2012	3.76
106	8	"Life Support"	Mark Tinker	Jennifer Cecil & Barbie Kligman	December 4, 2012	4.42
107	9	"I'm Fine"	Scott Printz	Gabe Llanas	December 11, 2012	3.87
108	10	"Georgia on My Mind"	Karen Gaviola	Jennifer Cecil & Barbie Kligman	December 18, 2012	3.84
109	11	"Good Fries Are Hard to Come By"	James Larkin	Elizabeth J. B. Klaviter & Zahir McGhee	January 8, 2013	4.01
110	12	"Full Release"	Ann Kindberg	Eric Haywood	January 15, 2013	4.10
111	13	"In Which We Say Goodbye"	Mark Tinker	Shonda Rhimes	January 22, 2013	5.32

== Viewing figures ==
=== Seasons 1–3 ===
Private Practice : U.S. viewers per episode (millions)

Season	Episode number																							Average
Season	1	2	3	4	5	6	7	8	9	10	11	12	13	14	15	16	17	18	19	20	21	22	23	Average
1	14.41	12.45	12.42	11.78	11.91	10.34	11.48	8.54	10.40	–														11.53
2	8.16	7.40	7.98	7.93	9.17	7.23	6.33	7.78	6.86	6.61	8.98	8.49	9.49	7.74	12.91	14.10	11.16	8.60	9.74	10.12	9.08	9.70	–	8.89
3	11.58	9.50	10.36	9.93	9.16	9.11	10.25	8.93	9.21	9.21	10.96	9.64	9.25	9.04	7.59	7.57	7.66	8.71	7.82	7.49	7.78	8.15	9.28	9.05

Audience measurement performed by Nielsen Media Research

=== Seasons 4–6 ===
Private Practice : U.S. viewers per episode (millions)

Season	Episode number																						Average
Season	1	2	3	4	5	6	7	8	9	10	11	12	13	14	15	16	17	18	19	20	21	22	Average
4	8.83	7.93	7.90	8.07	7.66	7.68	10.18	8.21	8.01	7.90	7.67	7.05	7.26	6.73	6.44	5.97	7.93	7.24	6.68	6.89	7.27	7.45	7.59
5	7.79	6.06	6.51	6.38	6.40	6.56	7.51	7.23	7.23	7.71	6.55	6.00	6.55	6.52	7.08	6.32	6.85	6.53	8.13	7.38	5.77	6.81	6.86
6	6.45	6.01	6.00	4.58	3.72	4.24	3.76	4.42	3.87	3.84	4.01	4.10	5.32	–									4.64

Audience measurement performed by Nielsen Media Research
