= Krista Vernoff =

American television producer, television and film writer, and author

- Born: October 24, 1971 (age 53)
- Education: Boston University (BFA)
- Occupations: Television producer; screenwriter
- Spouse: Alexandre Schmitt (m. 2018)
- Children: 3

Krista Vernoff (born October 24, 1971) is an American television screenwriter, executive producer and director. She is best known for being the showrunner for Grey's Anatomy (2007–11, 2017–2023) and its spin-off, Station 19 (2019–2023). She has also served as executive producer and writer for Shameless. Other works as producer-writer for television include Charmed and Wonderfalls.

Vernoff earned three Primetime Emmy Award nominations for Grey's Anatomy; two as a producer for the show's Best Drama Series nominations in 2006 and 2007 which were won and one personal Emmy nomination in 2006 for Best Drama Writing for her episode “Into You Like a Train”, an episode that was highly acclaimed years after its initial airing and hailed as the show's best single episode by The A.V. Club.

In 2017, Shonda Rhimes enlisted Vernoff to return to Grey's for its fourteenth season with complete creative control, after she signed a deal to leave ABC for Netflix and Stacy McKee, the previous showrunner, left to run its spin-off Station 19. Vernoff became showrunner for Station 19 after McKee's departure in 2019. That same year she signed a multiyear overall deal with ABC Studios to produce new projects for ABC under her production company, Trip the Light Productions.

== Early life ==
Vernoff attended Troy High School in New York, graduating in 1989. She paid tribute to the school in a season 7 episode of Grey's Anatomy, using the alma mater's song. She also attended Boston University. Vernoff aspired to be a veterinarian as a child, but then turned towards acting, studying it in college. She did not discover screenwriting until her 20s.

== Personal life ==
Vernoff comes from a Jewish family. Her father, Bob Verne died in 2001. A two-part episode of Grey's Anatomy was a tribute to him. She has a daughter, named Cosette. Cosette is named after the Les Misérables character of the same name. She also has a foster son and two stepsons, Benjamin and Adrien.

== Career ==
=== Television ===
Vernoff mentioned she was 28 when she was first interviewed for a writing job. She recalled the "profoundly offensive" moment when the male showrunner said, "I liked your script. Did someone help you write it?" after looking her up head to toe for a minute.

Most of Vernoff's work has been in the medium of television, as a script (or teleplay) writer. She has worked on a number of American television shows, including the program Charmed, from 2000 to 2004. She began as a story editor and became a co-producer of the show. Following this, she became writer and producer for the Fox program Wonderfalls, which aired in 2004. She has also written one episode for long-running drama Law & Order - (season 10, episode 14, "Sundown").

She co-wrote the crossover episodes of Private Practice - (season 2, episode 16, "Ex-Life", season 3, episode 11, "Another Second Chance") and wrote one episode for the second to fifth seasons.

She joined the Showtime series Shameless in 2012 as a writer. She was also co-executive producer.

In 2019, Vernoff joined other WGA members in firing their agents as part of the WGA's stand against the ATA and the practice of packaging, publishing a letter outlining her decision and reasons for supporting the guild.

==== Grey's Anatomy ====
Vernoff is best known for her time as a member of the creative team at the popular drama Grey's Anatomy. She is credited as an executive producer, and has also written episodes of the show. An episode Vernoff wrote, "Into You Like a Train", was nominated for a Best Writing Emmy Award.

Vernoff is credited with the introduction of the catchphrase, "seriously" into the dialogue of Grey's Anatomy episodes. Series creator Shonda Rhimes says that Vernoff used it frequently in the writer's room, and "said correctly, it can convey sarcasm, dismay, disbelief, a sense of moral and ethical superiority, and gentle chastising punishment, all at once."

According to Vernoff on the Grey's Anatomy iTunes Podcast, the episodes "Six Days Pt. 1 and 2" were written as a dedication to Vernoff's father, Bob Verne, who died in much the same way as Dr. George O'Malley's father in the series.

In May 2007, ABC announced that Vernoff would become showrunner and head writer of Grey's Anatomy effective fall 2007. Vernoff left her position with "Grey's Anatomy" in 2011. On April 28, 2017, she announced that she'd be returning to Grey's Anatomy for season 14. She is also showrunner for the Grey's spin-off series, Station 19, beginning with its season 3.

On January 25, 2023, Vernoff announced that she would be stepping down as showrunner for Grey's and Station 19 at the end of season 19 and season 6, respectively. On March 24, 2023, it was announced that Grey’s Anatomy had been renewed for season 20. Along with the announcement, it was reported that Meg Marinis would step in as the new showrunner. Marinis has been involved with Grey’s Anatomy since season 3, progressing from writer's assistant to medical researcher, amongst others, and became an executive producer in 2019.

== Theater ==
Vernoff is also a playwright; a production of her play "Me, My Guitar, and Don Henley" opened in October 2006 in an off-Broadway theater.
