= Don't Let's Start (Grey's Anatomy) =

- Grey's Anatomy episode
- Episode no.: Season 11; Episode 6
- Directed by: Rob Greenlea
- Written by: Austin Guzman
- Original air date: October 30, 2014
- Running time: 43 minutes

Guest appearances
- Meg Steedle as Melissa; James McCauley as Jeremy Weaver; Connie Ray as Karen Kepner; Cascy Beddow as Keith; Vyvy Nguyen as Jacki; Daisy Lightfoot as Caroline; Lori Alan as Ellen Weaver; Sydney Sweeney as Erin Weaver

Episode chronology
← Previous "Bend & Break"	Next → "Could We Start Again, Please?"
- Grey's Anatomy season 11

"Don't Let's Start" is the sixth episode of the eleventh season of the American television medical drama Grey's Anatomy and is the 226th episode overall. Written by Austin Guzman and directed by Rob Greenlea, the episode originally aired on the American Broadcasting Company (ABC) in the United States on October 30, 2014.

The episode revolves around the ongoing tension between Meredith Grey (Ellen Pompeo) and Maggie Pierce (Kelly McCreary) as they continue to navigate their complex relationship as half-sisters. At the same time, April Kepner (Sarah Drew) grapples with her pregnancy and the involvement of her overbearing mother, creating tension in her marriage to Jackson Avery (Jesse Williams). Meanwhile, Arizona Robbins (Jessica Capshaw) faces mounting pressure in her fetal surgery fellowship under Nicole Herman (Geena Davis), while Callie Torres (Sara Ramirez) and Arizona's separation continues to cause emotional strain.

The episode's title is a reference to the song with the same name by They Might Be Giants.

Upon its original broadcast, "Don't Let's Start" was watched by 8.08 million viewers in the United States and garnered a 2.4/7 Nielsen rating. It ranked #13 in the key 18–49 demographic and was the fifth most-watched drama of the night. The episode received positive reviews from television critics.

== Plot ==
The episode opens with a voice-over narration from Meredith Grey (Ellen Pompeo) reflecting on the theme of the complexity and unpredictability of trauma and life challenges.

April Kepner (Sarah Drew) treats Melissa (Meg Steedle), a carjacking victim brought into the ER; however, she seems more concerned about her car than her injuries.

Meanwhile, Derek Shepherd (Patrick Dempsey) and Meredith Grey (Ellen Pompeo) are treating a patient when Maggie Pierce (Kelly McCreary) reveals she has finished reading Ellis Grey's (Kate Burton) journals. While Maggie admires Ellis as a surgeon, she struggles to understand her as a person. After Maggie leaves, Derek suggests inviting her over for dinner, saying, "It’s what families do."

Jackson Avery (Jesse Williams) surprises April by bringing her mother, Karen (Connie Ray) to the hospital after her flight arrived early. April is stunned, unsure how to react, while Jackson explains her mom wanted to see her. He tells April to page him when she's free.

In the lounge, Arizona Robbins (Jessica Capshaw) prepares for her day when Callie Torres (Sara Ramirez) questions whether Arizona has been staying at the hospital. Arizona explains that with Nicole Herman (Geena Davis) constantly pushing her, it's easier to stay at work. Callie, no longer involved in Arizona's personal life, agrees not to reveal their split yet, promising to respect Arizona's wishes.

Ben Warren (Jason George) teases Miranda Bailey (Chandra Wilson) about skipping breakfast. He offers her a donut as they check on Jeremy Weaver (James McCauley), a patient with chest pains. Despite his symptoms, Jeremy smiles and insists it's just heartburn, but Bailey orders further tests after hearing about his unhealthy diet.

Jo Wilson (Camilla Luddington) speaks to Melissa's coworkers, learning they know little about her personal life. Owen Hunt (Kevin McKidd) tends to Melissa, whose condition deteriorates due to internal bleeding. Owen makes the bold decision to operate in the ER. Later, Callie recognizes a tattoo that reveals Melissa is a veteran, deeply moving Owen, who reflects that no one should endure what Melissa has been through.

April meets her mother in the lounge, where her mom presents zoo animal decals for the nursery. April, overwhelmed by work, is frustrated that her mom assumes she has time to plan for the baby. Jackson offers to help, insisting it'll be fun.

Jeremy insists he's healthy enough to leave, but Ben warns him his labs show otherwise. Bailey assures Jeremy they trust science, not gut feelings, and orders more tests.

Nicole shows Arizona scans of Waldo Pfeiffer, a baby with a life-threatening condition. Nicole stresses the urgency of performing fetal surgery and pushes Arizona to internalize the procedure's steps.

As Derek talks with Maggie, she mentions Meredith invited her to dinner. Derek, delighted, tells her to just bring herself. When Richard Webber (James Pickens Jr.) enters, Derek invites him to join, suggesting it's an opportunity for family bonding.

During Jeremy's procedure, Bailey and Ben reflect on their own health habits, which takes a serious turn when Bailey discovers a large tumor in Jeremy's esophagus, revealing the gravity of his condition.

== Release ==
"Don't Let's Start" was originally broadcast on October 30, 2014, in the United States on the American Broadcasting Company (ABC). The episode was watched by a total of 8.08 million viewers and garnered a 2.4/7 Nielsen rating. It ranked No. 13 in the key 18–49 key demographic and was the fifth most-watched drama of the night.

== Reception ==
"I feel like a broken record praising this season of Grey's Anatomy. It's the best season the show's done in at least half a decade, and its doing it without being "old school". Old school Grey's was a brand new show with a huge audience that flitted in and out each week. They had to keep people watching by throwing huge emotions and huge disasters at the audience. This Grey's renaissance is a result of comfort." - FemPop

"Don't Let's Start" received positive reviews from television critics upon telecast.

SpoilerTV praised the season's overall strength, writing, "Season 11 so far has been strong – stronger, even, than Season 10 and certainly Season 9." The TV Addict also lauded the episode, stating, "Oh, how I've missed you GREY'S, how I've missed you. After a week of absence, this week's episode was a biggie."

Entertainment Weekly offered a positive review, noting, "This week, there were many elements being juggled, which made for a fine hour, though it wasn't anything particularly special for the show that has proven before that it knows how to handle its ensemble." The review acknowledged some issues with pacing but concluded, "The episode had its moments: The Jackson Avery (Jesse Williams)-April Kepner (Sarah Drew) story played well, and I can't tell you how happy I am that Meredith Grey (Ellen Pompeo) and Derek Shepherd (Patrick Dempsey) are finally smiling at each other/'showering' together. Also, Alex Karev (Justin Chambers) and Jo Wilson (Camilla Luddington) are great. If only everything ran together a bit more smoothly, I'd have no complaints."
