= Beautiful Doom =

- Grey's Anatomy episode
- Episode no.: Season 9 Episode 5
- Directed by: Stephen Cragg
- Written by: Jeannine Renshaw
- Original air date: November 8, 2012
- Running time: 43 minutes

Guest appearances
- William Daniels as Dr. Craig Thomas; Steven Culp as Dr. Parker; Leanna Tallmeister as Melissa; Gaius Charles as Dr. Shane Ross; Camilla Luddington as Dr. Jo Karev; Tina Majorino as Dr. Heather Brooks; Jerrika Hinton as Dr. Stephanie Edwards; Tessa Ferrer as Leah Murphy; Zoe Perry as Katy Noonan

Episode chronology
← Previous "I Saw Her Standing There"	Next → "Second Opinion"
- Grey's Anatomy season 9

"Beautiful Doom" is the fifth episode of the ninth season of the American television medical drama Grey's Anatomy, and the 177th episode overall. Written by Jeannine Renshaw and directed by Stephen Cragg, the episode aired on the American Broadcasting Company (ABC) in the United States on November 8, 2012.

The episode centers on Meredith Grey (Ellen Pompeo) as she is reminded of her late half-sister Lexie Grey (Chyler Leigh), who died in the Season 8 finale plane crash, when a patient with similar crush injuries is admitted. Meredith struggles to treat the patient while navigating her grief, despite opposition from Richard Webber (James Pickens Jr.). At the same time, Cristina Yang (Sandra Oh) faces the sudden death of her mentor, Craig Thomas (William Daniels), during surgery. Meredith also juggles caring for her daughter Zola at the hospital with the absence of her husband, Derek Shepherd (Patrick Dempsey), with the help of Owen Hunt (Kevin McKidd), Callie Torres (Sara Ramirez) and Miranda Bailey (Chandra Wilson).

Upon its initial airing, "Beautiful Doom" was watched by 9.26 million viewers and earned a 3.3/8 Nielsen rating in the 18–49 demographic, making it the highest-rated television drama of the week. The episode received positive reviews from television critics, with praise directed towards Pompeo and Oh's performances.

== Plot ==
The episode opens with a voice-over narration from Meredith Grey (Ellen Pompeo), reflecting on the frustration of life's uncontrollable moments and the helplessness that comes with them.

Meredith is forced to juggle parenting with work when Derek Shepherd (Patrick Dempsey) is away for a lecture in Boston. While on the phone with Cristina Yang (Sandra Oh), who is bragging about an aneurysm case, Meredith drives past a serious car accident. She pulls over to help and finds a woman trapped under the car, triggering memories of her late half-sister, Lexie Grey (Chyler Leigh), who was trapped in the plane crash. Throughout the episode, Meredith and Cristina lean on each other, maintaining their long-distance friendship as they cope with their respective hospital responsibilities and the trauma of the plane crash.

Cristina and Dr. Craig Thomas (William Daniels) consult with a patient who needs two surgeries to repair an aneurysm and its underlying defect. The patient and her husband turn out to be doomsday preppers, adding an unusual dynamic to the situation. Meanwhile, Meredith becomes determined to save her patient, Melissa, but her emotional investment, likely influenced by her memories of Lexie, concerns Richard Webber (James Pickens Jr.), who questions whether her judgment is clouded. Despite his concerns, Meredith pushes forward, though she eventually agrees to pause the surgery when Richard insists.

At the same time, Cristina worries about her patient and the consequences Dr. Thomas might face for performing the surgery. While Cristina supports Dr. Thomas, he suffers a heart attack mid-surgery, forcing her to complete the operation on her own. Afterward, Cristina informs the patient's family that the surgery was successful, despite the tragic loss of her mentor.

Meredith, after completing her surgery, enjoys a brief moment of levity with her team by initiating a 30-second dance party. Later, she panics when she can't find her daughter Zola but eventually finds her with Owen Hunt (Kevin McKidd), who had been watching her while April Kepner (Sarah Drew) was in surgery.

Cristina calls Meredith again, sharing her concerns about Dr. Thomas and his impending firing. Meredith advises her as she faces her own concerns about her patient, eventually deciding it's the right time to operate again. In the end, Cristina arrives at Meredith's house, where the two friends share a quiet moment reflecting on their shared grief. As Cristina says, "Everyone's dead," they hug, finding comfort in their enduring friendship.

== Production ==
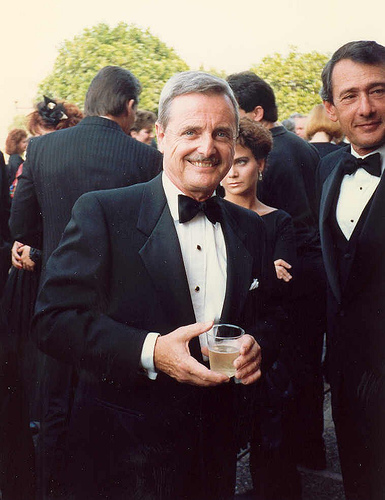
William Daniels made his last appearance as his character Dr. Craig Thomas died in the episode.

The episode was written by Jeannine Renshaw and directed by Stephen Cragg. The episode prominently features crossovers between Seattle, with Meredith Grey (Ellen Pompeo) at Seattle Grace, and Minnesota, where Cristina Yang (Sandra Oh) was practicing at the Mayo Clinic. These crossovers were depicted using split-screen sequences.

William Daniels makes his final appearance in the series as Dr. Craig Thomas.

== Release ==
"Beautiful Doom" was originally broadcast on Thursday, September 27, 2012, in the United States on the American Broadcasting Company (ABC). Upon its initial airing, the episode was watched by 9.26 million viewers, ranking #20 in overall viewership and placing #9 in the 18-49 key demographic. The episode scored a 3.3/8 in the Nielsen Ratings and was ranked as the most-watched drama of the week. It saw an increase in viewership from the previous episode, which was watched by 8.76 million viewers, also improving its rank in viewership.

== Reception ==
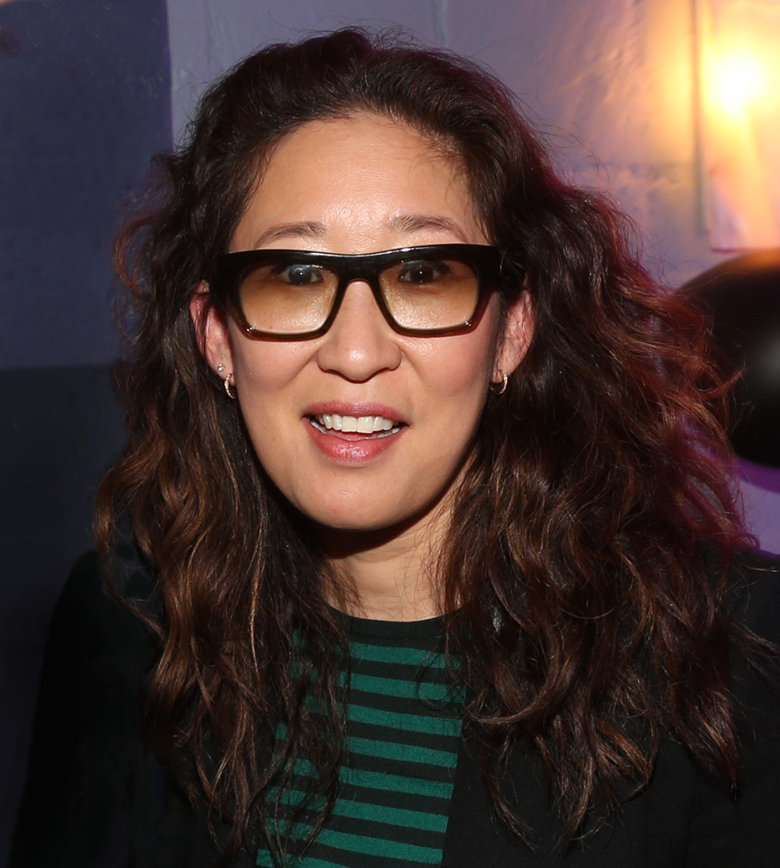
The cross-overs between Sandra Oh (Cristina Yang) (above) and Ellen Pompeo (Meredith Grey) were praised

"Beautiful Doom" received positive reviews from television critics upon telecast, with praise directed towards the performances of Ellen Pompeo (Meredith Grey) and Sandra Oh (Cristina Yang).

Wetpaint praised the episode for focusing on the central friendship between Meredith and Cristina, calling it "the Meredith and Cristina show." The review highlighted the effective use of split-screen sequences and the emotional impact of Dr. Craig Thomas' (William Daniels) death, which "really struck home."

TVLine also gave a positive review, appreciating the episode's focus on Meredith and Cristina. The review praised the split-screen format and noted the pivotal events of the hour, including Dr. Thomas' death, and described it as a "memorable" episode.

TwoCents similarly commended the simplicity and focus of the episode, noting that despite the physical distance, Meredith and Cristina have never been closer or more mature. The site praised the performances of Pompeo and Oh, in addition to Sara Ramirez (Callie Torres) and Chandra Wilson (Miranda Bailey) for their "fantastic" supporting roles, balancing their characters' personal and professional lives.

Entertainment Weekly described the episode as "wrenching", particularly emphasizing Cristina's poignant line, "Everyone's dead," which resonated with the overarching themes of loss and resilience. The site also praised the dramatic death of Dr. Craig Thomas, adding that Cristina's success in the surgery brought relief amidst the emotional weight of the episode.

E! Online echoed the praise for the focus on Meredith and Cristina's bond, even across a physical distance, calling them "each other's people." The site lamented Dr. Thomas' death, expressing frustration with the emotional toll but acknowledging that it propelled Cristina back to Seattle.

SpoilerTV highlighted Pompeo's performance, noting that Meredith-centric episodes always resonate due to her well-developed character. The review compared the episode favorably to past Meredith-focused episodes, praising the balance between Pompeo and Oh's screen presence and the intertwining of various character arcs.
