= Perfect Storm (Grey's Anatomy) =

- Grey's Anatomy episode
- Episode no.: Season 9 Episode 24
- Directed by: Rob Corn
- Written by: Stacy McKee
- Original air date: May 16, 2013
- Running time: 43 minutes

Guest appearances
- Hilarie Burton as Dr. Lauren Boswell; Jason George as Dr. Ben Warren; LisaGay Hamilton as Dr. Connie Ryan; Camilla Luddington as Dr. Jo Karev; Gaius Charles as Dr. Shane Ross; Tina Majorino as Dr. Heather Brooks; Jerrika Hinton as Dr. Stephanie Edwards; Tessa Ferrer as Dr. Leah Murphy

Episode chronology
← Previous "Readiness is All"	Next → "Seal Our Fate"
- Grey's Anatomy season 9

"Perfect Storm" is the twenty-fourth episode and season finale of the ninth season of the American television medical drama Grey's Anatomy, and is the 196th episode overall. It aired on May 16, 2013, on ABC in the United States. The episode was written by Stacy McKee and directed by Rob Corn.

The episode depicts Grey-Sloan Memorial Hospital grappling with power outages and a bus crash during a severe superstorm. Loosely inspired by Hurricane Sandy, which devastated the East Coast of the United States in 2012, the plot follows the doctors as they attempt to rescue survivors from the bus crash in the midst of the storm.

On its initial airing, the episode garnered an American audience of 8.99 million viewers and received widespread critical acclaim.

== Plot ==
The episode opens with a voice-over narration from Meredith Grey (Ellen Pompeo) about surviving life's perfect storms and discovering true strength in the aftermath.

The hospital continues to operate despite the challenges of a power outage caused by the superstorm. Meredith requires an emergency C-section, which is performed in the dark. Although the baby is born healthy, complications arise due to an earlier fall, causing Meredith to suffer serious abdominal bleeding. Bailey steps in to perform the surgery, but before picking up a scalpel, she carefully puts on two pairs of gloves. While Meredith is in surgery, Cristina and Derek share a heart-to-heart conversation. Meanwhile, Arizona, Alex, and Jo face chaos as oxygen machines in the NICU stop working, and Cristina performs surgery on Richard's patient by listening to his heart in the dark.

The emergency room staff scramble to assist passengers from a burning bus outside the hospital. Callie, April, and Bailey load patients into the hospital while Owen and Avery try to rescue a woman pleading for her daughter. As they pull her to safety, Avery spots a little girl’s shoe on the ground. He returns to the bus, which soon explodes, and later emerges from the flames with the little girl in his arms. This leads April to question her engagement to Matthew, fearing that Jackson may have died in the explosion.

In the midst of the chaos, Alex confesses his love to Jo, who reciprocates, and they begin a relationship. Meanwhile, Callie discovers Arizona’s affair with Dr. Boswell, leading to a tense confrontation between them, where their unfiltered feelings finally come out. At the same time, Cristina ends her relationship with Owen. Bailey, filled with guilt, searches for Richard throughout the hospital, wanting to apologize for past mistakes. Richard is found face down and unconscious in the hospital's electrical room after being electrocuted.

== Reception ==
=== Broadcast ===
The episode was originally broadcast on May 16, 2013 in the United States on the American Broadcasting Company (ABC) and was viewed by 8.99 million people. In the key 18-49 demographic, the episode ranked #11 in viewership and #18 overall, making it the #4 most-watched drama of the week. It earned a 3.1/8 Nielsen rating and was the #3 most-watched drama overall.

=== Reviews ===
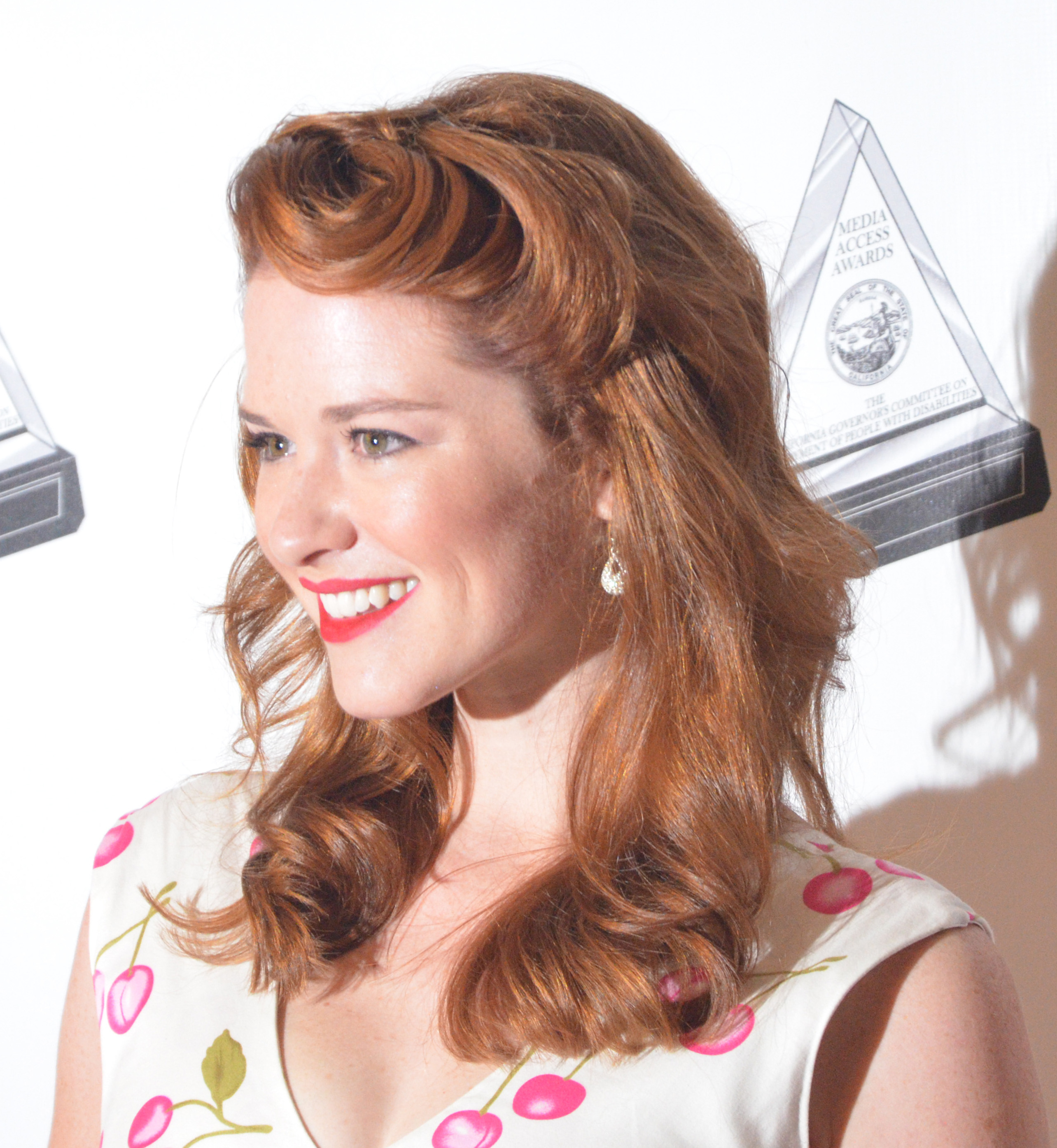
Sarah Drew received widespread critical acclaim for her performance as April Kepner.

The episode received widespread critical acclaim upon telecast.

Entertainment Weekly praised the episode, stating, "I’m freaking out! I spent the entire episode predicting which character was going to end the season in peril, and let’s just say that the nature of the episode caused me to change my mind at least 4 times."

TV Fanatic lauded the episode, commenting, "No matter what goes on during a season, Grey's Anatomy is always able to pull off an unforgettable finale and 'Perfect Storm' was no exception. From explosions to operating in the dark, to the arrival of a beautiful McBabyBoy and the realization of a plethora of feelings by many of the doctors, the hour was jam-packed." The review also praised the cast, specifically highlighting Ellen Pompeo and Chandra Wilson for their "amazing performances".

The Hollywood Reporter called the episode "emotional on multiple levels," while AfterEllen described it as a "hot mess of emotions."

Examiner.com echoed similar sentiments, writing, "Grey's Anatomy delivered yet another epic and emotional season finale that pushes our characters in challenging new directions." The review added, "'Perfect Storm' gets 5 out of 5 stars. This storm brought on all kinds of emotional strife and death that truly tests the seasoned doctors and pushes them to their element. They bond together, guiding each other through the dark, and as the dust settles from this mayhem, there are casualties of all kinds. The tragedy that leaves us hanging until next fall is one hell of a thrill ride full to the brim with shocks."
