= Going, Going, Gone (Grey's Anatomy) =

- Grey's Anatomy episode
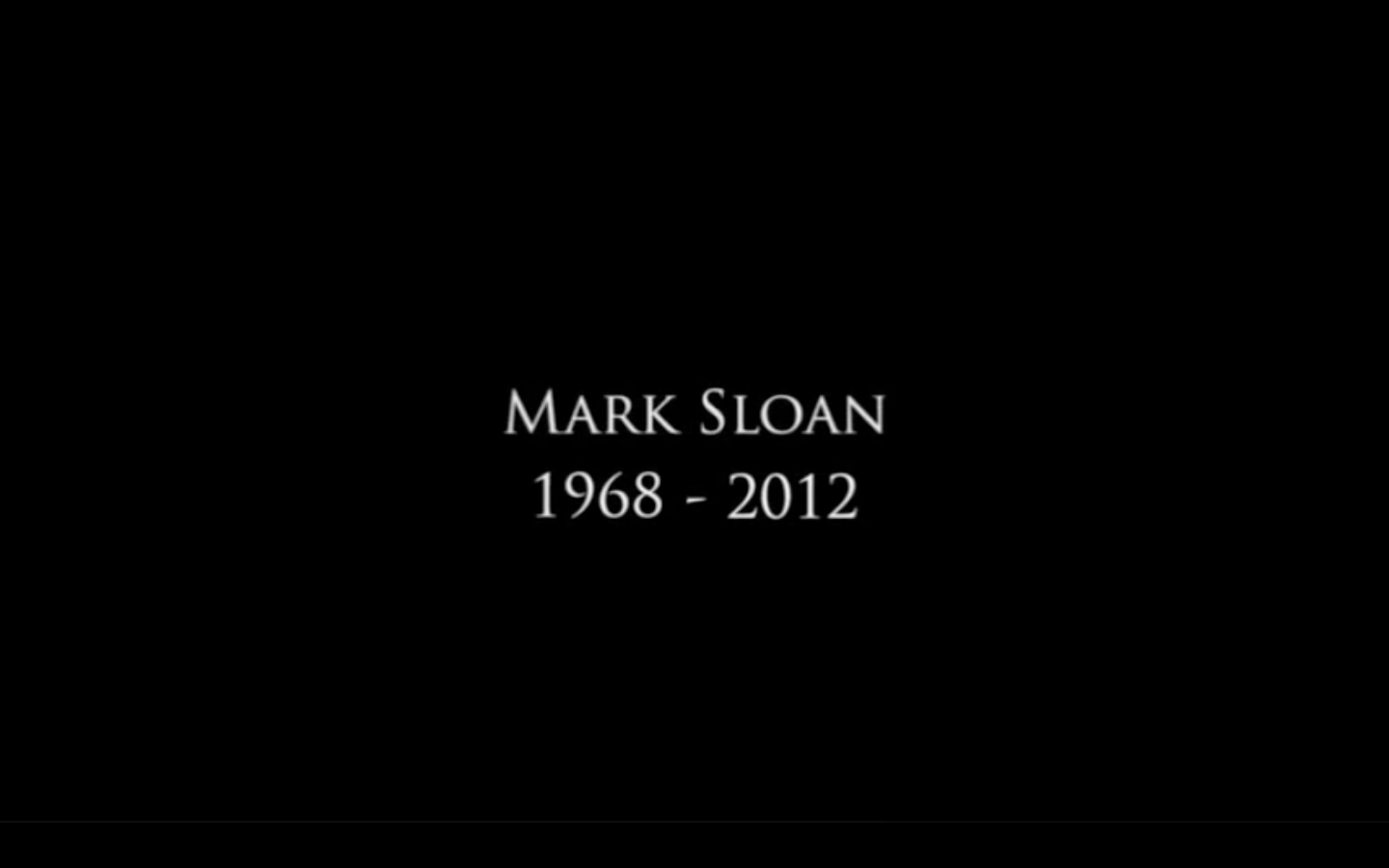
- The episode honored Mark Sloan with a title card of his lifespan.
- Episode no.: Season 9 Episode 1
- Directed by: Rob Corn
- Written by: Stacy McKee
- Original air date: September 27, 2012
- Running time: 43 minutes

Guest appearances
- Jason George as Dr. Ben Warren; William Daniels as Dr. Craig Thomas; Steven Culp as Dr. Parker; Philip Casnoff as Dr. Mel Barnett; Gaius Charles as Dr. Shane Ross; Camilla Luddington as Dr. Jo Wilson; Tina Majorino as Dr. Heather Brooks; Jerrika Hinton as Dr. Stephanie Edwards

Episode chronology
| ← Previous "Flight" | Next → "Remember the Time" |
- Grey's Anatomy season 9

"Going, Going, Gone" is the first episode of the ninth season of the American television medical drama Grey's Anatomy, and the show's 173rd episode overall. Written by Stacy McKee and directed by Rob Corn, the episode was originally broadcast on the American Broadcasting Company (ABC) in the United States on September 27, 2012. The initial airing was viewed by 11.73 million people and received a 4.4 Nielsen rating in the 18–49 demographic, registering the show as the week's highest rated television drama.

Grey's Anatomy centers around a group of physicians struggling to balance their professional lives with their personal lives. In this episode, the doctors of Seattle Grace Mercy West Hospital cope with the physical and emotional reverberations of the aviation accident that took place in the season eight finale, while several surgical residents are promoted. Further storylines include Cristina Yang (Sandra Oh) relocating to a different hospital, and a group of new interns being intimidated by Meredith Grey (Ellen Pompeo).

The episode saw the death of Mark Sloan (Eric Dane); the actor was let go due to budget cuts by the producers. Excessive spoilers were not released, in order to keep the fates of select characters unknown. However, multiple cast members leaked pictures from the set. Jason George returned in a guest capacity. Long-running cast member Camilla Luddington makes her first appearance as Jo Wilson in this episode. The episode received positive reviews from critics.

== Plot ==
The episode opens with a voice-over narration from Meredith Grey (Ellen Pompeo) on how death impacts the living and the lasting memories we leave behind.

In the Season 8 finale, Meredith Grey (Ellen Pompeo), Derek Shepherd (Patrick Dempsey), Cristina Yang (Sandra Oh), Lexie Grey (Chyler Leigh), Mark Sloan (Eric Dane), and Arizona Robbins (Jessica Capshaw) are caught in an aviation accident, leaving Lexie Grey dead, and the rest of the doctors stranded. "Going, Going, Gone" picks up about one month after the crash, and throughout the episode, features home videos of Sloan. The episode begins with Seattle Grace Mercy West Hospital's new interns, Shane Ross (Gaius Charles), Jo Wilson (Camilla Luddington), Heather Brooks (Tina Majorino), and Stephanie Edwards (Jerrika Hinton), expressing fear of Meredith Grey, who is now an attending general surgeon. It is revealed that former resident Alex Karev (Justin Chambers) will be pursuing a pediatric surgical fellowship at Johns Hopkins Hospital. The scene switches to Minnesota, where Yang is now a cardiothoracic surgical fellow.

Back in Seattle, Ben Warren (Jason George) surprises his fiancée Miranda Bailey (Chandra Wilson) with a visit. The couple reunites with constant sexual activity, for which the interns tease Bailey. Meanwhile, Callie Torres (Sara Ramirez) allows Shepherd to operate on a spinal cord, despite his hand being broken from the plane crash. Thereafter, it is revealed that Sloan is in a comatose state, and will be taken off life support that evening. In the hospital cafeteria, Meredith Grey announces that Wilson will be given the honor of performing a supervised appendectomy, a procedure historically used as a reward for interns. The hospital's chief of surgery, Owen Hunt (Kevin McKidd), introduces the new pediatric surgery attending, Mel Barnett (Philip Casnoff), to Torres and Karev. Barnett informs Karev that he will not be continuing with the African orphan charity program (a function to treat ill children from Third World countries), something that was initially finalized by the latter and former chief of pediatric surgery, Robbins. Karev becomes upset about this, and asks Torres to prevent Barnett from discontinuing the program, though Torres shows no interest in helping Karev.

During Shepherd's surgery, his hand becomes numb, and he frustratedly exits the operating room. In the intern appendectomy, Wilson makes a mistake and freezes, leading to a scolding from Meredith Grey. Back in Minnesota, Yang is annoyed by the peppy attitudes of her superiors at Mayo Clinic, Craig Thomas (William Daniels) and Parker (Steven Culp), so she decides to take a trip to Seattle for Sloan's death. However, her post-traumatic stress disorder (PTSD) hinders her from boarding the plane, and she ultimately remains in Minnesota. Meanwhile, Jackson Avery (Jesse Williams), now a plastic surgical fellow, sits by Sloan's bedside and talks of medical cases to him. Richard Webber (James Pickens, Jr.) enters Sloan's hospital room and removes him from life support. Unable to cope with Sloan's death, Meredith Grey boards a plane to visit Yang, but panics before it takes off. Shortly thereafter, Meredith Grey finds Karev at the airport bar, where he reveals that he will be remaining at Seattle Grace Mercy West Hospital. The next morning, Hunt visits April Kepner (Sarah Drew) at her family's farm, and asks her to begin working in Seattle again. At the conclusion of the episode, Torres returns home to Robbins, who is revealed to have had her lower left leg amputated as a result of the crash.

== Production ==
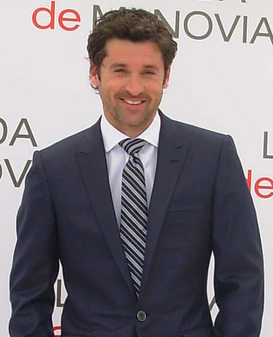
Prior to the premiere, ABC asked Patrick Dempsey (pictured) to remove a set photo of Mark Sloan from Twitter.

Running for approximately 43 minutes, the episode was written by Stacy McKee and directed by Rob Corn. The episode featured the songs "Body of Work", "My Heart Goes Boom Boom", "My Oh My", "Feels Like the End", "Portions for Foxes", "Without You", and "Into You". George returned to the episode as Warren, while Daniels, Culp, Casnoff, Charles, Luddington, Majorino, and Hinton made their first appearances as Thomas, Parker, Barnett, Ross, Wilson, Brookes, and Edwards, respectively. The episode's initial script read-through took place on July 16, 2012. Scenes in the operating room were filmed at the Prospect Studios in Los Feliz, Los Angeles. While creating the visual of Robbins' amputated leg, the special effects crew digitally removed Capshaw's real leg, and replaced it with a graphically created limb.

Prior to broadcast, series creator Shonda Rhimes did not release much information about the season premiere. However, it was revealed prior to broadcast that there would be a time jump in the episode. After it was announced that Dane would be departing shortly after the commencement of the ninth season, Dempsey uploaded a set picture on Twitter of Sloan in bad condition. Due to the unwanted release of spoilers, the American Broadcasting Company (ABC) requested that he delete the photo, and it was subsequently removed. The cast and crew of Grey's Anatomy were being particularly quiet about the fate of Capshaw's character. This secrecy was compromised when McKidd posted a picture on his Twitter account of the editing room, in which there was a picture of Robbins alive on the screen. The picture has since been taken down.

Discussing Robbins' storyline in "Going, Going, Gone", Capshaw revealed that she was "shocked" when it was made known to her that the character's leg would be amputated. The actress additionally noted that it was difficult to keep the fate of her character a secret. Following the premiere, E! Online reported that Dane's death and departure in the premiere were results of budgetary cuts, mandated by ABC. Speaking of Sloan's death, Rhimes said it was the "most tragic", adding that "he's part of the fabric of the show". Rhimes wrote that anything other than the character dying would entail him leaving his daughter behind, something the writers did not want. However, she noted that the writing team considered having him move to Los Angeles to be with Addison Montgomery (Kate Walsh) after her departure from Private Practice, but they feared it would have given the impression that his love confession for Lexie Grey was forgotten.

== Reception ==
=== Broadcast and ratings ===
"Going, Going, Gone" was originally broadcast on Thursday, September 27, 2012 in the United States on ABC. The episode's total viewership of 11.73 million ranked the show second in its 9:00 EST time slot, trailing CBS's Person of Interest (14.28 million), and fifth for the night, behind CBS's Two and a Half Men (12.54 million), Elementary (13.41 million), and The Big Bang Theory (15.66 million). The installment's 4.4 Nielsen rating in the target 18–49 demographic ranked the series first in its time slot and second for the night, trailing only CBS's The Big Bang Theory (5.0). In the key 18–34 demographic, the episode earned a 3.9 Nielsen rating, qualifying Grey's Anatomy as the top television program of the night in that demographic. "Going, Going, Gone"'s total viewership and 18–49 rating tallied the show's highest numbers since "Suddenly" on Thursday, January 5, 2012 (4.5 18–49 rating, 12.12 million viewers).

The 11.73 million people tuned into the episode marked a 3 percent viewership increase from the season eight finale (11.44 million), and a 13 percent increase from the previous season premiere (10.38 million). The episode's 4.4 Nielsen rating in the 18–49 demographic was a 7 percent increase from the season eight finale and previous season premiere, which both received 4.1 18–49 ratings. The Nielsen score additionally registered the show as the week's highest rated drama and third-highest rated scripted series in the 18–49 demographic, placing behind CBS's The Big Bang Theory (5.0) and ABC's Modern Family (5.5). Seven days of time-shifted viewing added on an additional 1.5 rating points in the 18–49 demographic and 3.28 million viewers, bringing the total viewership for the episode to 15.01 million viewers with a 5.9 Nielsen rating in the 18–49 demographic.

=== Critical reviews ===
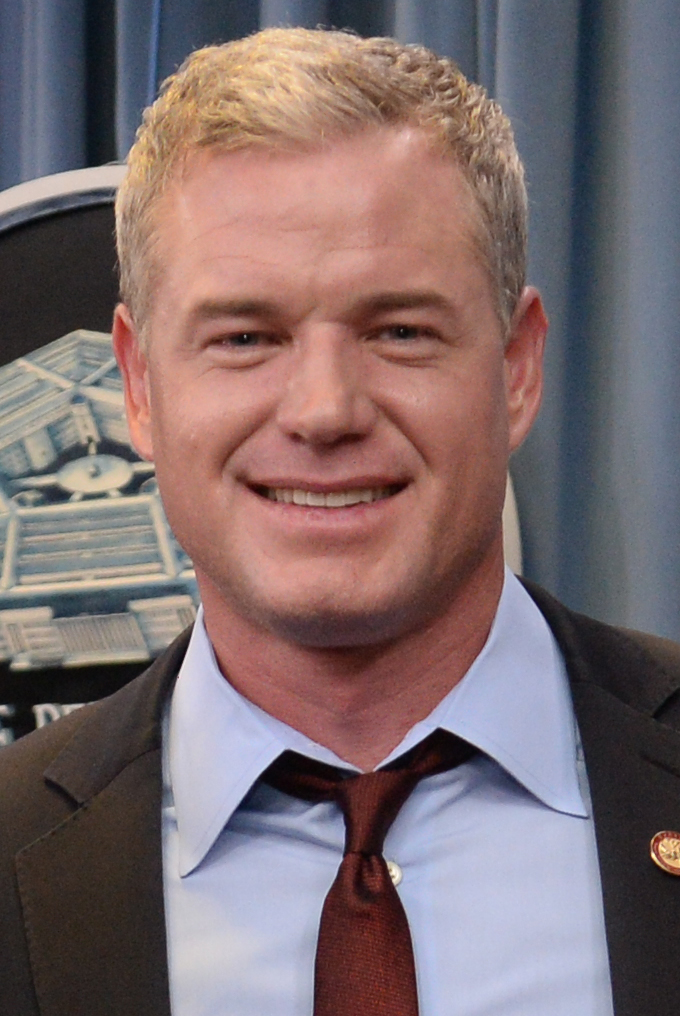
Eric Dane received praise for his portrayal of Mark Sloan.

"The videos so well helped to illustrate what a great guy Sloan ultimately was, because it seems that people mostly just remember all his skirt-chasing and general pig-headedness. The fact is that last night's episode was celebrating a great man, who was a father, a mentor, a friend, and a great doctor."

— Tanner Stransky, Entertainment Weekly

E! Online's Kristin dos Santos called the installment "gut-wrenching", saying it was the type of episode that "rips out your heart and feeds it to you with a spoon". Ann Oldenburg of USA Today summarized that the episode required viewers to "reach for the Kleenex". TV Guide's Natalie Abrams called the episode "heartbreaking", and praised the performances by Dempsey and Ramirez for their realism. Writing for Newsday, Verne Gay called Sloan's death scene "touching", and opined that the show will be different without the character's presence.

Kelly Schremph of Hollywood.com said the installment was "emotionally exhausting", adding that it foreshadowed a "drama-packed season". Schremph commented that all of the changes made it feel like an alternative reality episode, such as was featured in season eight. Writing for Entertainment Weekly, Tanner Stransky expressed similar viewpoints with Schremph, commenting that the installment paved the way for a great season, and that it resembled season eight's alternative reality episode. Stransky appreciated the "dignity" provided in Sloan's death scene, noting that the song played during the scene was "killer" and "so fitting". Jason Hughes of The Huffington Post called Sloan's death day "fateful". TV Fanatic gave a largely positive review to the season, "Grey's Anatomy always knows how to bring the drama and they did not fail in the Season 9 Premiere."

The International Business Times' Arlene Paredes concluded that the episode "raised the bar for deeply emotional yet again", and noted that it was "one of the most high-anticipated TV [returns] this fall". TVLine's Michael Ausiello opined that the attempt to hide Robbins' fate was the "worst kept secret in TV land". Writing for AfterEllen, Bridget McManus threatened to boycott the show if Capshaw's character was killed, but thought the FaceTime calls between Yang and Meredith Grey were humorous. Mark A. Perigard of the Boston Herald was critical of the time it took to rescue the doctors, and deemed the flashbacks featuring Sloan "unconvincing". Zap2it's Carina Adly MacKenzie opined that it "became increasingly clear" that Sloan would die as the episode progressed, and praised Capshaw's performance, noting that it was "brief but truly striking".
