= Gone Are the Days =

Gone Are the Days may refer to:

- Gone Are the Days!, a 1963 film starring Ossie Davis
- "Gone Are the Days", a track from the 2008 album Liverpool 8, written by Ringo Starr
- "Gone Are the Days", a 2021 song by Kygo featuring James Gillespie
- Gone Are the Days (2018 film), a 2018 film starring Lance Henriksen

== See also ==
- Gone Are the Dayes, a 1984 American made-for-television crime comedy film
