= Bend & Break =

- Grey's Anatomy episode
- Episode no.: Season 11; Episode 5
- Directed by: Jesse Bochco
- Written by: Meg Marinis
- Original air date: October 23, 2014
- Running time: 43 minutes

Guest appearance
- Unknown

Episode chronology
| ← Previous "Only Mama Knows" | Next → "Don't Let's Start" |
- Grey's Anatomy season 11

"Bend & Break" is the fifth episode of the eleventh season of the American television medical drama Grey's Anatomy, and is the 225th episode overall. Written by Meg Marinis, and directed by Jesse Bochco, the episode originally aired on the American Broadcasting Company (ABC) in the United States on October 23, 2014.

The episode centers around Callie Torres (Sara Ramirez) and Arizona Robbins (Jessica Capshaw), as they deep-dive into the problems contributing to their troubled marriage. At work, Callie immerses herself in the Veterans' project with Owen Hunt (Kevin McKidd) and begins to spend more time with Meredith Grey (Ellen Pompeo). Meanwhile, Arizona struggles to impress Dr. Nicole Herman (Geena Davis) as she works under her mentorship.

On its initial airing, the episode attracted an audience of 8.62 million viewers upon its initial airing, and received highly positive reviews from television critics, with major praise directed towards the performances of Ramirez and Capshaw.

== Plot ==
The episode opens with a voice-over narration from Arizona Robbins (Jessica Capshaw) and Callie Torres (Sara Ramirez) about recognizing when to step back in the face of chaos and accepting that not everything can be fixed.

In the therapist's office, Callie expresses frustration that despite talking about having another baby for months, they are not making progress. Arizona defends her decision to go to Africa, reminding Callie that she came back for her, only to find Callie pregnant. The therapist points out that they are going in circles and suggests hitting the reset button. While Callie is hesitant, Arizona agrees it's worth trying.

At work, Callie grows frustrated during a meeting with Owen Hunt (Kevin McKidd) and Jackson Avery (Jesse Williams), calling their idea to use part of her grant for one patient's facial reconstruction the "stupidest thing" she's ever heard. After Jackson leaves, Owen asks Callie what's really bothering her.

Back at home, Callie and Arizona establish a strict schedule for childcare and set rules, including no talking except in emergencies and no intimacy, with each other or anyone else. Callie struggles with these rules, and on the first day, she watches Arizona cooking with April Kepner (Sarah Drew), realizing how much the separation is affecting her.

As the days go by, Arizona is succeeding at work, receiving praise from Dr. Nicole Herman (Geena Davis) for her progress. Meanwhile, Callie is dealing with a patient, Emily, who is in constant pain but has no clear diagnosis. Overwhelmed, Callie hides in a supply room where Meredith Grey (Ellen Pompeo) finds her. Realizing how isolated she feels, Callie admits she has no one to talk to.

Later, Callie and Meredith bond over drinks at a bar, sharing their frustrations with their partners. Callie jokes about her past marriages and wonders if Sofia will become a legacy cheater. They laugh, drink, and sing, finding a moment of relief from their struggles.

On Day 29, Callie and Arizona break their intimacy rule, unable to wait any longer. Arizona worries about what their therapist, Dawson, might say, but Callie dismisses the concern, suggesting they just keep it a secret.

Finally, on Day 30, in their therapist's office, Arizona opens up about how the 30-day break made her realize how much she loves Callie. She acknowledges that while her life feels chaotic, Callie is her anchor. However, when it's Callie's turn to speak, she reveals that during the break, she has rediscovered joy and freedom, something she hasn't felt in a long time. She explains that constantly trying to fix their relationship has been slowly killing her. Callie believes they should love themselves and their daughter Sofia, rather than each other, signaling that their marriage is over. As Arizona is left speechless, Callie packs her things and walks out of the therapist's office, ending their relationship.

== Reception ==
=== Broadcast ===
"Bend & Break" aired on October 23, 2014, on the American Broadcasting Company (ABC) in the United States. Upon its initial release, the episode was watched by 8.62 million viewers, garnering a 2.5/8 Nielsen rating. It ranked #16 in the 18–49 key demographic and was the 4th most-watched drama of the night.

=== Reviews ===
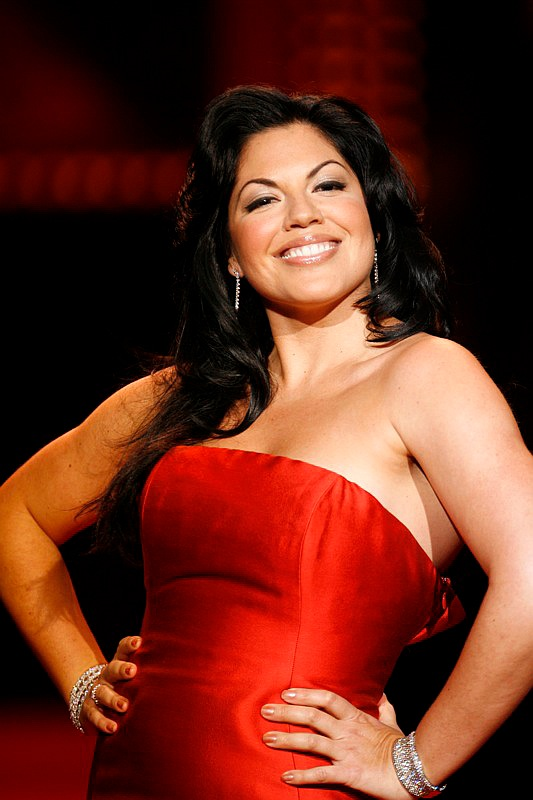
The development of Sara Ramirez's character Callie Torres was highly praised.

"Bend & Break" received highly positive reviews, with critics praising the performances of Sara Ramirez and Jessica Capshaw, as well as the chemistry between Ramirez and Ellen Pompeo's characters.

Entertainment Weekly highlighted the scene where Callie and Meredith bonded over drinks, calling it "a moment of beautiful, weird, comical bonding". Fempop gave the episode a score of 4.9/5, noting, "There's subtlety and nuance in this episode that has been absent from the relationship it explores." They added, "This episode gets 5 stars because it brings really great drama, but mainly because of the vagina song. I love how every major Calzona episode features a brief musical number."

HuffPost also gave a mostly positive review, particularly enjoying the scenes between Callie and Meredith, stating, "Watching Callie and Meredith get drunk though? Entirely amusing. It makes sense that two people who need to not go home could put their misery to good use."

However, Christina Tran of TV Fanatic offered a mixed review, remarking, "All in all, this installment just wasn't my cup of tea." Despite her mixed feelings, Tran appreciated the dynamic between Callie and Meredith, saying, "My favorite part of the entire installment was mainly when Callie hung with Meredith. It's easy to forget sometimes throwing back tequila shots and even cheeseburgers make a terrible day nearly forgettable."
