= Zoe Perry =

American actress (born 1983)

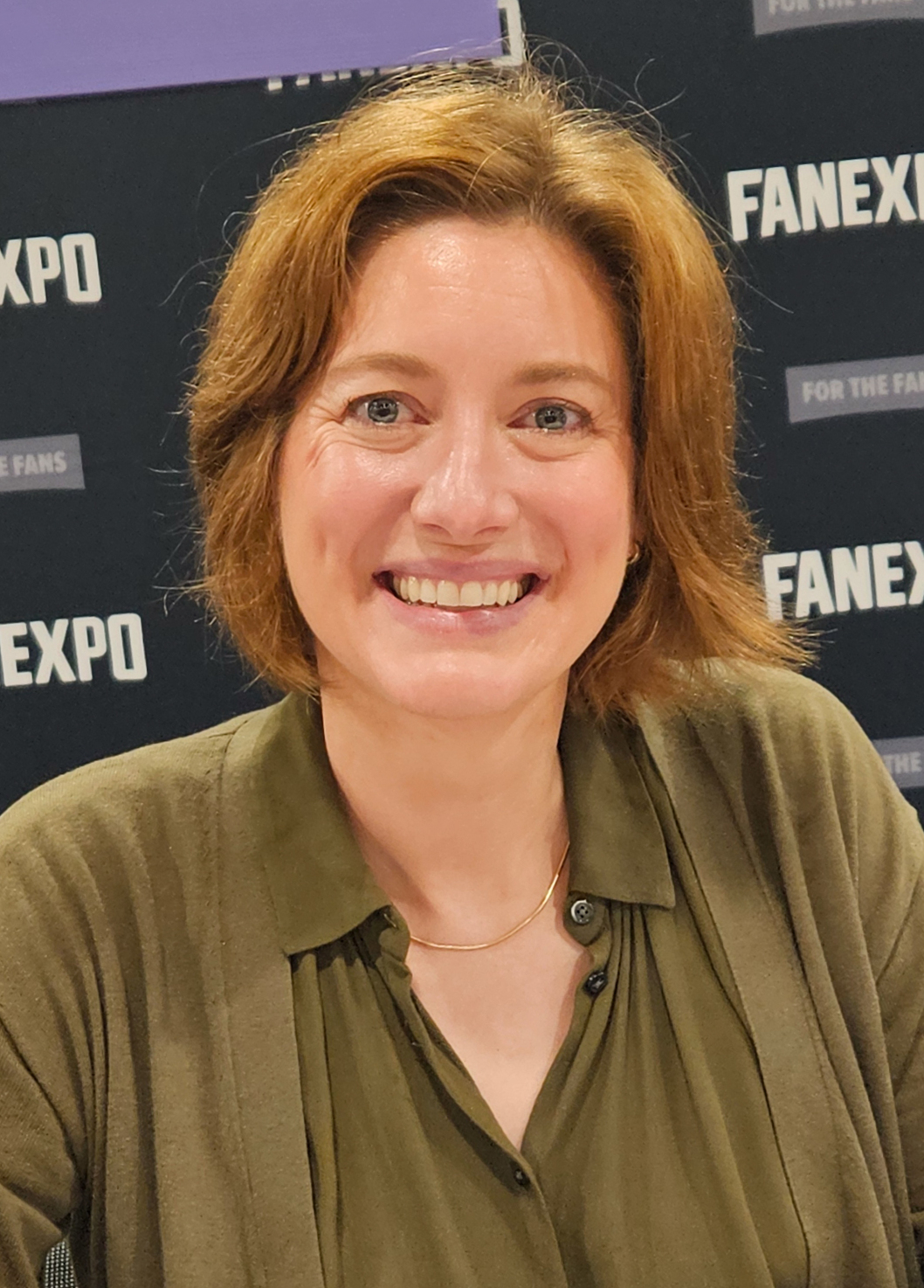
- Perry in 2026
- Born: September 26, 1983 (age 43); Chicago, Illinois, U.S.
- Education: Boston University; Northwestern University (BA)
- Occupation: Actress
- Years active: 1992–present
- Spouse: Gab Taraboulsy (m. 2022)
- Parents: Jeff Perry (father); Laurie Metcalf (mother)
- Relatives: Zoe Akins (great-grandaunt); Hugo Rumbold (great-granduncle)

Zoe Perry (born September 26, 1983) is an American actress. The daughter of actors Laurie Metcalf and Jeff Perry, she made her film debut in Deception (2008) and had a supporting role in the independent drama film The Loss of a Teardrop Diamond (2008).

After recurring roles as Jane on The Family (2016) and Samantha Ruland on Scandal (2017), Perry had her breakout as Mary Cooper on the CBS sitcom Young Sheldon (2017–24). The role, which was played by her mother Laurie Metcalf on The Big Bang Theory, earned Perry a nomination for the Critics' Choice Television Award for Best Supporting Actress in a Comedy Series in 2019. She reprised the role on the spin-off series Georgie & Mandy's First Marriage (2024–present).

== Early life ==
Perry was born in Chicago to actors Laurie Metcalf and Jeff Perry. They divorced when she was three years old. Her first television roles were two appearances as Jackie Harris (as seen in flashback) on the ABC sitcom Roseanne, the character portrayed by her mother. Her parents, however, did not want her to pursue acting until she became an adult, fearing the effect of stress. Perry said that she was too shy to act in high school, but began performing at Northwestern University as a way to make friends after transferring from Boston University.

== Career ==
After graduating, Perry moved to New York to search for television work, landing small roles on series such as Law & Order: Criminal Intent, but homesickness brought her back to California, where she found theater work. In 2013, she performed in The Other Place on Broadway alongside her mother. In 2015, she performed alongside her father and Kevin McKidd in Eugene O'Neill's Pulitzer Prize-winning drama Anna Christie at the Odyssey Theatre Ensemble in West Los Angeles.

Perry appeared in nine episodes of the ABC thriller The Family in 2016. In 2017, she had a recurring role on the ABC political thriller Scandal, starring her father. The same year, she was cast on Young Sheldon, a spin-off of the CBS sitcom The Big Bang Theory, as a younger version of Mary Cooper (Sheldon Cooper's mother), the character her mother had played on 14 episodes of The Big Bang Theory. Despite her family link to the character, she received the role through an audition. She reprised the role of Mary Cooper on Georgie & Mandy's First Marriage, which premiered on CBS on October 17, 2024.

== Filmography ==
=== Film ===
Year	Title	Role	Notes
2008	Deception	Secretary #1	
2008	The Loss of a Teardrop Diamond	Mathilde	
2011	Turkey Bowl	Zoe	
2014	Everyday Miracles	Maxine	
2016	No Pay, Nudity	Renie	

=== Television ===
Year	Title	Role	Notes
1992 & 1995	Roseanne	Young Jackie Harris	Episodes: "Halloween IV" & "All About Rosey"
2006	Law & Order: Criminal Intent	Wendy	Episode: "Vacancy"
2006	Conviction	Audrey Knowles	2 episodes
2006, 2008, & 2010	My Boys	Waitress	4 episodes
2007	Cold Case	Melinda Levy '82	Episode: "Justice"
2008	Private Practice	Lisa	Episode: "Equal & Opposite"
2009	Ave 43	Janet	2 episodes
2012	Grey's Anatomy	Katy Noonan	Episode: "Beautiful Doom"
2013	Second Shot	Krystal Munson	Episode: "If It Ain't Fix, Don't Break It"
2016	The Family	Jane	9 episodes
2016	NCIS	Harpers Ferry Police Officer Kristen Fields	2 episodes
2017	Liv and Maddie	Marlow	Episode: "Tiny House-A-Rooney"
2017	Scandal	Samantha Ruland	Recurring role (season 6); Recurring role
2017–2024	Young Sheldon	Mary Cooper	Main role
2024–present	Georgie & Mandy's First Marriage	Mary Cooper	Recurring role
2025	The Conners	Officer Binkowski	Episodes: "It's Gonna Be a Great Day" & "Applications, Accusations and a Man-Bag"

=== Awards and nominations ===
Year	Award	Category	Nominated work	Result
2019	Critics' Choice Television Awards	Best Supporting Actress in a Comedy Series	Young Sheldon	Nominated

== Theater ==
Year	Title	Role	Venue
1992	My Thing of Love	N/A	Steppenwolf Theatre Company
1998	Pot Mom	Lorraine	Steppenwolf Theatre Company
2006	The Late Christopher Bean	Susan Haggett	The Actors Company Theatre Studio
2010	The Lieutenant of Inishmore	Mairead	Mark Taper Forum
2010	The Autumn Garden	Sophie Tuckerman	Antaeus Theatre Company
2011	End Days	Rachel Stein	Odyssey Theatre Ensemble
2011	Peace in Our Time	Lilly Blake	Antaeus Theatre Company
2012–2013	The Other Place	The Women	Samuel J. Friedman Theatre
2013	Good Television	Brittany	Atlantic Theater Company
2014	The Way West	Manda	Steppenwolf Theatre Company
2015	I'll Get You Back Again	Staged Reading	Steppenwolf Theatre Company
2015	Anna Christie	Anna	Odyssey Theatre Ensemble
