= Grey's Anatomy season 9 =

Grey's Anatomy
- Season 9
- DVD cover art for the ninth season of Grey's Anatomy
- Showrunners: Tony Phelan; Shonda Rhimes; Joan Rater
- Starring: Ellen Pompeo; Sandra Oh; Justin Chambers; Chandra Wilson; James Pickens Jr.; Sara Ramirez; Eric Dane; Kevin McKidd; Jessica Capshaw; Sarah Drew; Jesse Williams; Patrick Dempsey
- No. of episodes: 24

Release
- Original network: ABC
- Original release: September 27, 2012 – May 16, 2013

Season chronology
- ← Previous; Season 8 Next → Season 10

The ninth season of the American television medical drama Grey's Anatomy began airing in the United States on the American Broadcasting Company (ABC) on September 27, 2012, with the season premiere "Going, Going, Gone" and consists of 24 episodes with the season finale "Perfect Storm" airing on May 16, 2013. The season was produced by ABC Studios, in association with Shondaland Production Company and The Mark Gordon Company; the showrunners being Tony Phelan and Joan Rater. The season was officially released on DVD as a 6-disc box-set under the title of Grey's Anatomy: The Complete Ninth Season - Everything Changes on August 27, 2013 by Buena Vista Home Entertainment.

The season follows the characters dealing with the aftermath of the season 8 plane crash that claimed the life of Lexie Grey (Chyler Leigh) and upon rescue Mark Sloan (Eric Dane), who dies after sustaining injuries from the crash. Derek Shepherd (Patrick Dempsey) finds his surgical career in doubt after badly damaging his hand but Callie Torres (Sara Ramirez) ultimately manages to save his hand. The show's protagonist Meredith Grey (Ellen Pompeo) deals with the loss of her half-sister Lexie and later discovers that she is pregnant. Cristina Yang (Sandra Oh) is severely traumatized upon rescue and later decides to take up her fellowship in Minnesota. Arizona Robbins (Jessica Capshaw), another survivor of the plane crash, upon return, realizes that her leg had to be amputated to save her life, reacts badly to this, becoming bitter and blaming her wife Callie and her former friend Alex Karev (Justin Chambers). To prevent the doctors' court case from being thrown out, Owen Hunt (Kevin McKidd) decides to divorce Yang, but the two agree to start again. The hospital itself becomes liable for the crash, putting its future in extreme doubt prompting the 4 crash survivors and Torres to purchase the hospital. Miranda Bailey (Chandra Wilson) marries her partner Ben Warren (Jason George), April Kepner (Sarah Drew) returns home to Ohio, but is brought back by Hunt to rejoin the hospital and she restarts her relationship with Jackson Avery (Jesse Williams).

The season ended with an average of 12.51 million viewers and ranked #26 which was higher than the previous 2 seasons and in the 18-49 key demographic ranked at #10. Ellen Pompeo won the Favorite TV Drama Actress at the 39th People's Choice Awards and the show itself won the Favorite Network TV Drama. It was announced by ABC on May 10, 2013 that the tenth season of Grey's Anatomy would begin in the fall of 2013.

The website Screen Rant ranked the season #2 on their 2023 ranking of the 19 Grey's Anatomy seasons.

== Episodes ==
The number in the "No. in series" column refers to the episode's number within the overall series, whereas the number in the "No. in season" column refers to the episode's number within this particular season. "U.S. viewers in millions" refers to the number of Americans in millions who watched the episodes live. Each episode of this season is named after a song.

No. overall	No. in season	Title	Directed by	Written by	Original release date	Prod. code	U.S. viewers (millions)
173	1	"Going, Going, Gone"	Rob Corn	Stacy McKee	September 27, 2012	901	11.73
A month after the plane crash, Callie and Derek are heartbroken when they realize that they have to take Mark off of life support. Cristina has moved to Rochester, Minnesota and Meredith encourages her to get on a plane to Seattle. Alex worries that the new pediatric surgeon will destroy Arizona's program. Frustrated with his past decisions, Owen visits April and offers her her job back. Meanwhile, Meredith's ruthlessness towards her interns earns her the nickname "Medusa". At the end of the episode, it is revealed that Arizona did survive, but had to have her leg amputated by Karev, and she resents Callie because of it.
174	2	"Remember the Time"	Tony Phelan	William Harper	October 4, 2012	902	10.84
A flashback to the aftermath of the plane crash recounts how the doctors dealt with the disaster. Meredith accepts what has happened, and wants to move on with her life, while Derek, afraid he won't regain full use of his hand, turns to teaching. Cristina is catatonic, but slowly recovers under Owen's care. Arizona is afraid of losing her leg, but after the infection takes a turn for the worse, Callie is forced to make the decision to amputate. Mark is in critical condition, but takes a turn for the better before falling into a coma.
175	3	"Love the One You're With"	Debbie Allen	Zoanne Clack	October 18, 2012	903	9.69
Meredith, Derek, Cristina, Callie and Arizona are offered a large amount of money as a settlement deal from the plane's manufacturer, but the decision has to be unanimous. Jackson and April are put in a stressful situation when they're obligated to work together on a case. Cristina warms up to Dr. Thomas. Callie has to convince a young girl (Skyler Day) with a nearly severed foot to postpone her solo sailing trip in order to save her foot. After visiting the hangar where the crashed plane now sits, Derek decides not to accept the settlement and convinces the others as well. Arizona is bitter towards Callie for making the call to cut off her leg.
176	4	"I Saw Her Standing There"	Kevin McKidd	Austin Guzman	October 25, 2012	904	8.76
Realizing Derek might never perform surgery again, Meredith stops discussing her cases with him in hopes of keeping his spirits up. While Arizona is in the hospital getting a prosthetic leg, Alex and Callie face the consequences of deciding to amputate. Jackson and April continue to have sex together, while Richard asks Catherine Avery to assist him with the surgery of a man whose testicles have grown to great proportions. Cristina starts sleeping with Dr. Parker but stops when she finds out that he has been using her to force Dr. Thomas to retire.
177	5	"Beautiful Doom"	Stephen Cragg	Jeannine Renshaw	November 8, 2012	905	9.26
Meredith is forced to juggle parenting with work when Derek has a lecture in Boston. On her way to work, she comes across a car accident and rushes to help a woman whose injuries remind her of Lexie. Meredith and Cristina lean on each other and maintain their long-distance friendship. Meredith is adamant about saving her patient's life, despite complications in surgery. Cristina assists Dr. Thomas with a cardiac case, when he suddenly suffers a heart attack during the operation. Following Dr. Thomas' death, Cristina returns to Seattle.
178	6	"Second Opinion"	Chandra Wilson	William Harper	November 15, 2012	906	8.84
Cristina returns to Seattle Grace. The crash victims meet with the legal team to decide their actions with moving forward with the lawsuit. Alex asks Meredith to sell him her mother's house. Jo works with a patient dubbed "Santa Claus" who constantly vomits over her and realizes he's been misdiagnosed. Callie feels guilty about Derek's botched hand surgery, while Bailey asks Arizona for help on a case. Jackson admits to April that he has feelings for her. The victims of the plane crash find out that the legal team is actually going after the hospital and Owen for their settlement deal.
179	7	"I Was Made for Lovin' You"	Laura Innes	Peter Nowalk	November 29, 2012	907	8.95
Arizona returns to the hospital and works on a case with Alex and April. Owen feels responsible for the crash after finding out he switched the hospital's airline prior to the crash due to budget cuts. Bailey begins resenting having a Christmas wedding, while she and Cristina work on a patient who needs a liver transplant. April and Jackson have a pregnancy scare but break up when the test is negative. Callie and Jackson research options to fix Derek's hand. Cristina realizes she wants Owen back, but just before telling him, he asks for a divorce. Meredith tells Derek that she is three weeks pregnant, but doesn't want anyone else to know.
180	8	"Love Turns You Upside Down"	Mark Jackson	Stacy McKee	December 6, 2012	908	9.10
The first-year interns go on their first 24-hour shift; Meredith tasks her intern, Heather, with calling Derek's family to ask if they would donate a nerve for his hand surgery. Alex and Jo work together on a premature baby whose teen mother abandons her, leading Jo to admit to Alex that she was also abandoned as an infant. Cristina's interns take their rivalry too far and are reprimanded when their negligence almost leads to the death of a patient. Heather finds out that Meredith is pregnant. Derek's sister, Liz (Neve Campbell) comes to Seattle to donate her nerve to Derek.
181	9	"Run, Baby, Run"	Rob Corn	Debora Cahn	December 13, 2012	909	8.17
With her wedding fast approaching, Bailey enlists April to take care of her patients and asks Meredith, Callie, and Arizona to be her bridesmaids. Meredith and Derek have their first ultrasound. Cristina finds out Owen wants the divorce to avoid being caught in a conflict of interest during the investigation into the crash; after confronting him, they decide to save their relationship. April and Jackson decide to go the wedding with a date, deciding on Shane and Stephanie, respectively. Callie and Jackson operate on Liz and Derek, and Meredith tells Liz about the pregnancy. When Jo cuts too deep during a surgery with Alex, she feels she was set up and complains to Arizona. On their way to the wedding, Richard comforts Bailey when she starts having cold feet, but when Richard gets a call that Adele is in the ER, they are forced to return to the hospital.
182	10	"Things We Said Today"	Ron Underwood	Austin Guzman	January 10, 2013	910	9.34
As Bailey rushes to save Adele's life, everyone at the wedding wonders where she is. Arizona tells Callie that she wants to try to have sex for the first time since the plane crash. Cristina and Owen debate whether to go through with the divorce, while a motorcycle gang is brought to the hospital after a car accident. Alex and Jo bond over their similar childhoods in foster care. Meredith and Bailey successfully operate on Adele and Bailey returns to her wedding. Richard shows up after the ceremony and when Meredith walks over he tells her that Adele has died from a heart attack.
183	11	"The End Is the Beginning Is the End"	Cherie Nowlan	Joan Rater	January 17, 2013	911	8.80
A decision is reached regarding the plane crash case, with the hospital found guilty of negligence, and each of the survivors is awarded $15 million in compensation. Callie decides to throw a celebration dinner. Jackson performs surgery on Sloan's old patient, and has a disagreement with Arizona over the procedure used. In order to train his hand post-surgery, Derek starts playing ping-pong. Grieving over his wife, Richard has withdrawn, causing the doctors around him to worry. Meredith, Richard and Heather work on a patient who eats her hair as a coping mechanism and to deal with the overbearing mother. At Callie's dinner, Meredith reveals that she's pregnant. Meanwhile, at the hospital, Owen finds out that the insurance company won't pay the crash compensation due to a loophole in the contract and the hospital paying for it would result in bankruptcy.
184	12	"Walking on a Dream"	Rob Hardy	Tia Napolitano	January 24, 2013	912	9.01
Dr. Alana Cahill, a financial advisor, is hired to find ways to save the hospital money. Meredith tries to deal with unpredictable pregnancy hormones while trying to save the life of a pregnant woman in dire need of a new liver. Arizona, Alex, and Cristina operate on a little girl from the hospital's Africa program. Owen helps Arizona deal with phantom leg syndrome as she begins feeling pain in her no longer existing leg. Derek returns to performing surgeries and operates on an old patient with a brain tumor. April is asked out on a date by a paramedic. Meredith faces her fear of flying when she has to fly to Oregon to get a liver for her patient while dealing with her pregnancy hormones. At a staff meeting, Dr. Cahill explains that the only way to help save the hospital from closing its doors is to shut down the ER.
185	13	"Bad Blood"	Steve Robin	Jeannine Renshaw	January 31, 2013	913	8.93
As a part of streamlining daily operations, Dr. Cahill has new cameras put in the hospital. Derek and April work together to find a way for the hospital to keep the ER open. Meredith, Bailey, and Richard are given a class on a new technique for hernias, only to learn that the new policies put the number of procedures before patients. Dr. Cahill assists Owen with the case of the ER's final patient. Cristina and Leah work on a young man who is critically injured but is not given a blood transfusion due to his beliefs as a Jehovah's Witness; Leah is reprimanded when she tries to give him blood in an attempt to save his life. Arizona, Callie, and Alex work on a young gymnast who is depressed following her double hip replacement. It is revealed that Dr. Cahill closed the ER because she's finding a buyer for the hospital.
186	14	"The Face of Change"	Rob Greenlea	Stacy McKee	February 7, 2013	914	8.91
In order to sell the hospital, Dr. Cahill suggests finding a photogenic doctor to be "the face of the hospital" in the advertising campaign to attract prospective buyers. During a date with Matthew, April rides along on a call to help a badly injured boy; with the nearest ER too far away, they secretly bring him back to Seattle Grace. With Dr. Cahill busy showing the hospital to the prospective buyers, Pegasus, April and the other attendings go behind Chief Hunt's back to pull off the surgery. Meanwhile, Callie and Richard go "undercover" to Portland General, another hospital owned by Pegasus, and learn discouraging things about their management practices, leading to Callie proposing a surprising plan. Alex and Jackson operate on a transgender teenager whose father doesn't want him to transition.
187	15	"Hard Bargain"	Tony Phelan	William Harper	February 14, 2013	915	8.57
The plane-crash victims discuss whether they should buy the hospital, with everyone but Arizona on board. Derek is mortified when he finds that agreeing to be the new face of the hospital is more than he intended. April goes to Jackson for dating advice. Dr. Bailey and Arizona work on the case of a young cancer patient who is in need of a genome mapping procedure, but the procedure is not approved by Owen due to the new budget constraints. The crash victims learn that Pegasus is due to buy the hospital that night and, led by Derek, resort to drastic measures to prevent the sale.
188	16	"This Is Why We Fight"	Jeannot Szwarc	Austin Guzman	February 21, 2013	916	8.75
Dr. Cahill convinces Pegasus to resubmit their bid; meanwhile, Meredith, Derek, Cristina, Callie, and Arizona meet up with an investor whose capital is needed to buy the hospital. Heather overhears Dr. Cahill saying that Pegasus is buying the hospital only to liquidate its assets and fire the staff. After being turned down due to lack of management experience, Meredith and Cristina work to get Richard and Owen on board, but a second meeting with the investor also goes poorly. Jackson considers moving to Boston, as the news of liquidation plans spreads. After talking with Richard, Catherine offers the Avery Foundation's investment in the hospital, but only if Jackson sits on the Board of Directors, effectively running the hospital.
189	17	"Transplant Wasteland"	Chandra Wilson	Zoanne Clack	March 14, 2013	917	8.20
The transition to new management has the doctors at each other's throats, with much of the frustration directed at an equally frustrated Jackson, whom many felt should not be on the board due to his youth and lack of management experience. Matters become worse when Owen quits as chief, leaving the OR board in complete disarray when the attendings are all swamped with surgeries. At the board meeting, Jackson proposes that the hospital be renamed "Grey-Sloan Memorial Hospital" and to reopen the ER.
190	18	"Idle Hands"	David Greenspan	Gabriel Llanas	March 21, 2013	918	9.39
The ER reopens after extensive remodeling and includes new state-of-the-art technology. Meredith worries that something might be wrong with the baby. Cristina is frustrated when her new administrative duties cut into her medical research time. Callie and Arizona work on improving their sex life. Bailey is pushing for the hospital to sponsor her genome sequencing project. Meredith starts "catastrophizing" about potential congenital defects before she and Derek find out the sex.
191	19	"Can't Fight This Feeling"	Mark Jackson	Meg Marinis	March 28, 2013	919	9.02
The hospital is overrun by patients following a gas tanker explosion. Owen bonds with a boy whose parents were both injured in the crash. Meredith takes interest in the case of a boy whose mother believes he is more sick than the tests indicate. Callie prepares for her TED conference speech with help from Arizona. Meredith asks Dr. Bailey to map Zola's genetic history and her genome to check for Alzheimer's genetic markers.
192	20	"She's Killing Me"	Nicole Rubio	Debora Cahn	April 4, 2013	920	8.58
Meredith and Derek update their wills and healthcare directives when Meredith tests positive for several genetic markers of Alzheimer's. The attendings train two Syrian doctors in performing lifesaving surgeries in the field without much modern equipment, anesthesia or electricity. Derek recognizes that Heather has potential for neurosurgery and focuses on teaching her, much to Shane's chagrin. Owen continues to spend time with the boy whose parents are still in critical condition following the gas tanker crash. Bailey finds herself in hot water when several of her patients are found to have a staph infection.
193	21	"Sleeping Monster"	Bobby Roth	Bronwyn Garrity	April 25, 2013	921	8.24
The CDC comes to the hospital to investigate the post-op infections in Dr. Bailey's patients. Tensions flare when Jackson doesn't side with the rest of the board in supporting Dr. Bailey. Meredith wants Cristina present during her labor. Matthew asks April to give him a second chance. Alex admits to Cristina that he loves Jo. The CDC investigation concludes that the cause of the infection is in the surgical gloves used during Dr. Bailey's surgeries.
194	22	"Do You Believe in Magic?"	Kevin McKidd	Dan Bucatinsky	May 2, 2013	922	8.87
Despite being cleared by the CDC, Dr. Bailey locks herself in her lab, feeling betrayed by her colleagues. Meredith and Richard operate on a magician's assistant literally sawed in half during a magic trick gone awry. April and Jackson rekindle their friendship. Owen continues to care for Ethan, whose father is still in a coma. Dr. Lauren Boswell, a craniofacial surgeon, works with Arizona and Jackson on a complex case of a baby whose brain is on the outside of his skull. Alex tries to avoid Jo, but she comes to him for help when her boyfriend physically abuses her.
195	23	"Readiness is All"	Tony Phelan	William Harper	May 9, 2013	923	8.97
A major storm is heading for Seattle and the hospital is preparing for an influx of patients. Alex brings Jo's boyfriend to the hospital after finding him badly beaten; after being treated, Alex threatens him not to report Jo to the police. Matthew proposes to April. Ethan's father wakes up after nine days in a coma, crushing Owen's dreams of adopting Ethan. Meredith falls down a staircase, but the baby is confirmed to be fine. Dr. Bailey is still hesitant to have contact with patients. Following their surgery, Arizona and Dr. Boswell have a close encounter in an on-call room. As the storm rolls in and the power goes out, Meredith goes into labor.
196	24	"Perfect Storm"	Rob Corn	Stacy McKee	May 16, 2013	924	8.99
The hospital continues to operate despite the power outage. Meredith requires a C-section, which is performed in the dark; the baby is born healthy, but her earlier fall causes serious abdominal bleeding. Alex, Jo and Arizona must deal with chaos when oxygen machines in the NICU stop working. Cristina operates on Richard's patient by listening to his heart in the dark. The ER staff rush to help the passengers of a burning bus. April questions her engagement to Matthew when she believes that Jackson has died in the bus explosion. Alex tells Jo he loves her, she reciprocates, and they begin a relationship. Callie finds out about Arizona's encounter with Dr. Boswell. Cristina breaks up with Owen. Dr. Bailey returns to the OR when she has to perform emergency surgery on Meredith. While trying to fix the emergency generators and restore the lights, Richard is shocked due to the water in the basement.

== Cast and characters ==
=== Main ===
- Ellen Pompeo as Dr. Meredith Grey
- Sandra Oh as Dr. Cristina Yang
- Justin Chambers as Dr. Alex Karev
- Chandra Wilson as Dr. Miranda Bailey
- James Pickens Jr. as Dr. Richard Webber
- Sara Ramirez as Dr. Callie Torres
- Eric Dane as Dr. Mark Sloan (Note: Dane was only credited through episode 2 of Season 9)
- Kevin McKidd as Dr. Owen Hunt
- Jessica Capshaw as Dr. Arizona Robbins
- Sarah Drew as Dr. April Kepner
- Jesse Williams as Dr. Jackson Avery
- Patrick Dempsey as Dr. Derek Shepherd

=== Recurring ===
- Camilla Luddington as Dr. Jo Wilson
- Gaius Charles as Dr. Shane Ross
- Jerrika Hinton as Dr. Stephanie Edwards
- Tessa Ferrer as Dr. Leah Murphy
- Jason George as Dr. Ben Warren
- Loretta Devine as Adele Webber
- Constance Zimmer as Dr. Alana Cahill
- William Daniels as Dr. Craig Thomas
- Debbie Allen as Dr. Catherine Avery
- Justin Bruening as Matthew Taylor
- Neve Campbell as Lizzie Shepherd
- Sarah Chalke as Casey Hedges
- Tina Majorino as Dr. Heather Brooks
- Hilarie Burton as Dr. Lauren Boswell
- Bianca Taylor as Elena Bailey
- Charles Michael Davis as Dr. Jason Myers
- Steven Culp as Dr. Darren Parker
- Eddie Jemison as Stan Grossberg
- Adina Porter as Dr. Ramsey
- Nicole Cummins as Paramedic Nicole

== Production ==
=== Development ===
Grey's Anatomy was renewed by ABC on May 10, 2012. In June 2012, ABC set the premiere date of Grey's Anatomy to September 27, 2012, and it would remain in the Thursday 9:00pm timeslot that it has had since the third season. In October 2012, it was reported that this season would have the same episode count as season 8, meaning it would have a total of 24 episodes. Shonda Rhimes revealed that the season 9 finale would not revolve around a 'disaster' episode.

=== Casting ===
In May 2012, it was announced that 6 original cast-mates, Ellen Pompeo, Sandra Oh, Justin Chambers, Chandra Wilson, James Pickens, Jr. and Patrick Dempsey had renewed their contracts for another 2 seasons, as Meredith Grey, Cristina Yang, Alex Karev, Miranda Bailey, Richard Webber and Derek Shepherd respectively. In July 2012, it was announced that cast member Eric Dane would not be returning to Grey's Anatomy as a series-regular, and would leave after 2 episodes to give his character a proper ending. In addition, Chyler Leigh requested to be released from her contract to spend more time with her family and her character was killed off in the season 8 finale, while Kim Raver also departed from the show following the events of the season 8 finale, having declined the offer of a contract extension. Other series regulars, Sara Ramirez, Kevin McKidd, Jessica Capshaw, Sarah Drew, and Jesse Williams all returned to the series as regulars, though Capshaw would not have a major role in the first few episodes because of her maternity leave.

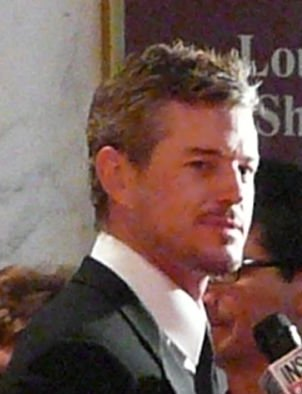
Eric Dane made his final appearance as Mark Sloan in the second episode as he succumbed to his injuries from the crash.

In August 2012, it was announced that Camilla Luddington, Gaius Charles and Tina Majorino had been cast as Jo Wilson, Shane Ross, and Heather Brooks respectively; these characters would be the new interns of Seattle Grace-Mercy West. TVGuide later reported that even with all of the recurring cast being added to Grey's Anatomy for the new season that True Blood star Camilla Luddington is the only actress with an option to become a series-regular. In September 2012, it was announced that Jerrika Hinton and Tessa Ferrer had been cast as new interns Stephanie Edwards and Leah Murphy respectively. In August 2012, it was announced that Debbie Allen would reprise her role as Catherine Avery at sometime in series, and she is set to direct the third episode. In September 2012, it was announced that Steven Culp would be cast as a new doctor at a new hospital, and would be known as Dr. Parker.

In September 2012, it was announced that William Daniels, former Boy Meets World star, and Jason George would reprise their roles as Dr. Craig Thomas, and Ben Warren respectively. In September 2012, TVLine reported that Bones's Andrew Leeds had been cast in a potentially recurring role for the ninth season. In December 2012, Wetpaint reported that Constance Zimmer had been cast in a recurring role as Dr. Cahill and would appear in at least 4 episodes. In November 2012, it was announced that Neve Campbell, known for her role in Scream (1996), would be cast as one of Derek's sisters. It was not until late November that her role was revealed as Liz Shepherd, a therapist. In November 2012, it was announced that in 2013, someone would die on Grey's Anatomy. TVGuide then reported that Loretta Devine, who is known as Adele Webber, would be reprising her role for 2 episodes, and that she would be the one to die. In November 2012, TVLine reported that Nip/Tuck alum Roma Maffia was cast in a recurring role as a member of the hospital board. In December 2012, TVLineTVLine and Wetpaint reported that Ringer and Switched at Birth star, Justin Bruening, was cast as a paramedic known as Matt.

In January 2013, it was announced that Gaius Charles, Tina Majorino, Jerrika Hinton and Tessa Ferrer were all given the option to become series-regulars if Grey's Anatomy were to be renewed. Sarah Chalke is set to guest-star in an episode in the spring, as TVLine reported in January 2013. It was announced by E! Online on March 29, One Tree Hill alumni Hilarie Burton will be cast in a recurring role as a specialist in an investigation going on in the hospital. Her character is to arrive on the twenty-second episode of the season. However, this later turned out to be untrue as Burton ended up portraying a specialist doctor named Lauren Boswell.

== Reception ==
=== Ratings ===
Grey's Anatomy's ninth season opened up to 11.73 million viewers with a 4.4/12 Nielsen rating/share in the 18–49 demographic. The viewership for the episode was an 11% increase from the previous season premiere, which was viewed by a total of 10.38 million people. The rating was a 7% increase from the previous season premiere, which received a 4.1/10 Nielsen rating/share in the 18–49 demographic. The Nielsen score additionally registered the show as the week's highest-rated drama in the 18–49 demographic. As of December 2012, "Going, Going, Gone" has served as the season's most-viewed episode. "Run, Baby, Run" is the season's least-viewed episode, with 8.17 million viewers and a 2.9/8 Nielsen rating/share in the 18-49 demographic. At the time, the season finale was the series' lowest-watched season finale with 9.00 million viewers and 3.1 in the 18-49 rating demographci.

==== Live + SD ratings ====
No. in series	No. in season	Episode	Air date	Time slot (EST)	Rating/Share (18–49)	Viewers (m)	18–49 Rank	Viewership rank	Drama rank
173	1	"Going, Going, Gone"	September 27, 2012	Thursdays; 9:00 P.M.	4.4/12	11.73	6	16	1
174	2	"Remember the Time"	October 4, 2012	Thursdays; 9:00 P.M.	3.8/10	10.84	6	14	1
175	3	"Love the One You're With"	October 18, 2012	Thursdays; 9:00 P.M.	3.4/9	9.69	11	21	1
176	4	"I Saw Her Standing There"	October 25, 2012	Thursdays; 9:00 P.M.	3.0/8	8.76	16	—N/a	4
177	5	"Beautiful Doom"	November 8, 2012	Thursdays; 9:00 P.M.	3.3/8	9.26	9	20	1
178	6	"Second Opinion"	November 15, 2012	Thursdays; 9:00 P.M.	3.2/8	8.84	10	—N/a	1
179	7	"I Was Made for Lovin' You"	November 29, 2012	Thursdays; 9:00 P.M.	3.1/8	8.95	15	—N/a	3
180	8	"Love Turns You Upside Down"	December 6, 2012	Thursdays; 9:00 P.M.	3.0/8	9.10	13	22	1
181	9	"Run, Baby, Run"	December 13, 2012	Thursdays; 9:00 P.M.	2.9/8	8.17	16	23	3
182	10	"Things We Said Today"	January 10, 2013	Thursdays; 9:00 P.M.	3.2/8	9.34	9	18	3
183	11	"The End is the Beginning is the End"	January 17, 2013	Thursdays; 9:00 P.M.	3.0/8	8.80	13	24	3
184	12	"Walking on a Dream"	January 24, 2013	Thursdays; 9:00 P.M.	3.0/8	9.01	12	21	2
185	13	"Bad Blood"	January 31, 2013	Thursdays; 9:00 P.M.	2.8/7	8.93	12	19	5
186	14	"The Face of Change"	February 7, 2013	Thursdays; 9:00 P.M.	3.1/8	8.91	14	24	4
187	15	"Hard Bargain"	February 14, 2013	Thursdays; 9:00 P.M.	2.8/7	8.57	11	21	2
188	16	"This Is Why We Fight"	February 21, 2013	Thursdays; 9:00 P.M.	3.1/8	8.75	13	—N/a	2
189	17	"Transplant Wasteland"	March 14, 2013	Thursdays; 9:00 P.M.	2.6/7	8.20	10	18	2
190	18	"Idle Hands"	March 21, 2013	Thursdays; 9:00 P.M.	3.0/8	9.39	5	13	3
191	19	"Can't Fight This Feeling"	March 28, 2013	Thursdays; 9:00 P.M.	2.9/8	9.02	8	16	2
192	20	"She's Killing Me"	April 4, 2013	Thursdays; 9:00 P.M.	2.8/8	8.58	13	23	2
193	21	"Sleeping Monster"	April 25, 2013	Thursdays; 9:00 P.M.	2.7/7	8.24	10	22	3
194	22	"Do You Believe in Magic?"	May 2, 2013	Thursdays; 9:00 P.M.	3.0/9	8.87	7	22	2
195	23	"Readiness is All"	May 9, 2013	Thursdays; 9:00 P.M.	3.1/9	8.97	8	21	3
196	24	"Perfect Storm"	May 16, 2013	Thursdays; 9:00 P.M.	3.1/8	8.99	11	18	3

==== Live + 7 Day (DVR) ratings ====
No. in series	No. in season	Episode	Air date	Time slot (EST)	18–49 rating increase	Viewers (millions) increase	Total 18-49	Total viewers (millions)	Ref
173	1	"Going, Going, Gone"	September 27, 2012	Thursdays; 9:00 P.M.	1.5	3.28	5.9	15.01	
174	2	"Remember the Time"	October 4, 2012	Thursdays; 9:00 P.M.	1.7	3.49	5.5	14.33	
175	3	"Love the One You're With"	October 18, 2012	Thursdays; 9:00 P.M.	1.8	3.70	5.2	13.40	
176	4	"I Saw Her Standing There"	October 25, 2012	Thursdays; 9:00 P.M.	1.9	3.96	4.9	12.72	
177	5	"Beautiful Doom"	November 8, 2012	Thursdays; 9:00 P.M.	1.9	3.94	5.2	13.20	
178	6	"Second Opinion"	November 15, 2012	Thursdays; 9:00 P.M.	1.6	3.27	4.8	12.10	
179	7	"I Was Made for Lovin' You"	November 29, 2012	Thursdays; 9:00 P.M.	1.6	3.42	4.7	12.37	
180	8	"Love Turns You Upside Down"	December 6, 2012	Thursdays; 9:00 P.M.	1.8	3.75	4.8	12.86	
181	9	"Run, Baby, Run"	December 13, 2012	Thursdays; 9:00 P.M.	1.6	3.49	4.5	11.70	
182	10	"Things We Said Today"	January 10, 2013	Thursdays; 9:00 P.M.	1.6	3.46	4.8	12.79	
183	11	"The End is the Beginning is the End"	January 17, 2013	Thursdays; 9:00 P.M.	1.6	3.24	4.6	12.04	
184	12	"Walking on a Dream"	January 24, 2013	Thursdays; 9:00 P.M.	1.8	3.65	4.8	12.66	
185	13	"Bad Blood"	January 31, 2013	Thursdays; 9:00 P.M.	1.7	3.47	4.5	12.40	
186	14	"The Face of Change"	February 7, 2013	Thursdays; 9:00 P.M.	1.6	3.41	4.7	12.32	
187	15	"Hard Bargain"	February 14, 2013	Thursdays; 9:00 P.M.	1.7	3.73	4.5	12.32	
188	16	"This Is Why We Fight"	February 21, 2013	Thursdays; 9:00 P.M.	1.5	3.20	4.6	11.95	
189	17	"Transplant Wasteland"	March 14, 2013	Thursdays; 9:00 P.M.	1.7	3.64	4.3	11.67	
190	18	"Idle Hands"	March 21, 2013	Thursdays; 9:00 P.M.	1.5	3.12	4.5	12.50	
191	19	"Can't Fight This Feeling"	March 28, 2013	Thursdays; 9:00 P.M.	1.5	3.57	4.4	12.59	
192	20	"She's Killing Me"	April 4, 2013	Thursdays; 9:00 P.M.	1.5	3.27	4.4	11.87	
193	21	"Sleeping Monster"	April 25, 2013	Thursdays; 9:00 P.M.	1.3	2.92	4.0	11.17	
194	22	"Do You Believe in Magic?"	May 2, 2013	Thursdays; 9:00 P.M.	1.5	3.16	4.5	12.02	
195	23	"Readiness is All"	May 9, 2013	Thursdays; 9:00 P.M.	1.5	3.26	4.6	12.23	
196	24	"Perfect Storm"	May 16, 2013	Thursdays; 9:00 P.M.	1.4	3.05	4.5	12.04	

=== Critical response ===
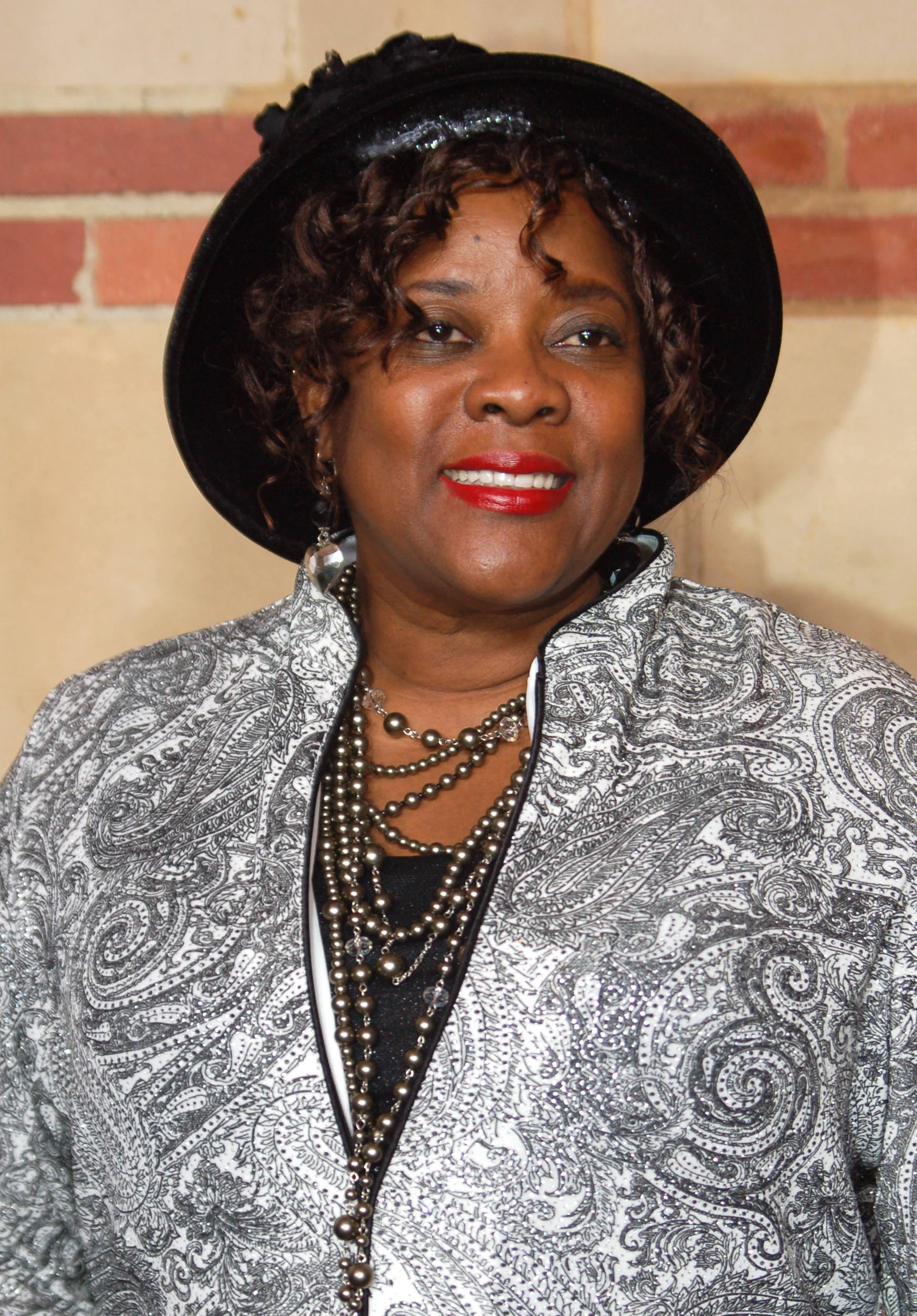
Loretta Devine made her final appearance as Adele in the first episode of 2013 and garnered highly positive reviews.

The season received positive reviews with critics praising numerous aspects of the long-running medical drama including the bonds of the characters with each other and its connection with the audience. Robert Bianco of USA Today noted that after 9 seasons, "There's still life left in Grey's." What Culture gave a positive review for the season, "Grey's Anatomy has developed into a fine example of how a TV show can mature beyond its initial purpose." Toronto Star called it "a solid return to form." TV Fanatic gave a largely positive review to the season, "Grey's Anatomy always knows how to bring the drama and they did not fail in the Season 9."

Melissa Maerz of Entertainment Weekly also gave a positive response stating, "There's still one good reason to keep watching: Where else can you find such deep friendships between co-workers?" Margaret Lyons of New York Magazine wrote that the first part of the season "has been mostly a downer, thanks in part to a whole bunch of people dying at the beginning of the season and also the shocking lack of interesting romances."

Examiner.com reviewing the season finale wrote, "[Grey's] delivered yet another epic and emotional season finale that pushes our characters in challenging new directions." The site added, "'Perfect Storm' gets 5 out of 5 stars. This storm brought on all kinds of emotional strife and death that truly tests the seasoned doctors and pushes them to their element. They bond together, guiding each other through the dark and as the dust settles from this mayhem, there are casualties of all kinds. The tragedy that leaves us hanging until next fall is one hell of a thrill ride full to the brim with shocks."

== DVD release ==
Grey's Anatomy: The Complete Ninth Season - Everything Changes
Set Details		Special Features
24 Episodes (1 extended); 6-Disc Set; English (Dolby Digital 5.1 Surround); Subtitles: English SDH, Spanish & French; Runtime: 1032 minutes		Extended Finale: "Perfect Storm"; Spotlight Cast Piece: James Pickens Jr.; Spotlight Character Piece: Arizona Robbins; Deleted Scenes; In Stitches: Season 9 Outtakes
Release Dates
Region 1	Region 2	Region 4
August 27, 2013	November 4, 2013	October 2, 2013
