= Meg Steedle =

American actress

- Born: Winston-Salem, North Carolina, U.S.
- Education: Northwestern University
- Occupation: Actress
- Years active: 2008–present

Meg Chambers Steedle is an American actress, known for her supporting roles in Boardwalk Empire, Mr. Mercedes and The Mysteries of Laura.

== Early life and education ==
Steedle was born in Winston-Salem, North Carolina, the daughter of two dentists. She grew up in Greensboro, North Carolina, graduating from Greensboro Day School in 2004 before graduating from Northwestern University in 2008.

== Career ==
Steedle had a major supporting role in season 3 of the HBO series Boardwalk Empire, playing Billie Kent. She had worked extensively in theater before appearing in the series, in productions including Barefoot in the Park and The Heir Apparent. She was a recurring character in the first season of NBC's The Mysteries of Laura, portraying Detective Francesca "Frankie" Pulaski.

She appeared in the music video of the Silversun Pickups "Nightlight" on YouTube from their Better Nature LP. She played a mother with a stillborn child in American Horror Story: Coven, in the episode "Burn, Witch. Burn!".

== Filmography ==
=== Film ===
Year	Title	Role	Notes
2008	Slit and Commit	Lydia	Short
2011	What's Life Got to Do with It?	Brenda	Short
2018	Gone Are the Days	Heidi	
2018	The Lightkeeper	Sunny	Short
2021	Writing Around the Christmas Tree	Olive Olsen	TV movie

=== Television ===
Year	Title	Role	Notes
2011	Body of Proof	Heather Clayton	"Buried Secrets"
2012	Boardwalk Empire	Lillian 'Billie' Kent	Recurring role (season 3)
2013	Don't Trust the B— in Apartment 23	Emily	"The Seven Year B—"
2013	American Horror Story	Stillborn Mother	"Burn, Witch. Burn!"
2013	Horizon	Ellen	TV film
2014	NCIS	Amanda Kendall	"The Admiral's Daughter"
2014	Perception	Bonnie Mullane	"Painless"
2014	Grey's Anatomy	Melissa	"Don't Let's Start"
2014	Salvation	Lily Knox	TV film
2015	Mom	Shelly	"Benito Poppins and a Warm Pumpkin"
2015	The Mysteries of Laura	Francesca 'Frankie' Pulaski	Main role (season 1)
2015	NCIS: New Orleans	Cheryl Evans	"Foreign Affairs"
2016	Nashville	Sienna	"If I Could Do It All Again"
2016–17	Code Black	Dr. Kelly Pruitt	"Exodus", "The Devil's Workshop"
2017	I'm Dying Up Here	Sabrina	"The Unbelievable Power of Believing"
2018	Staties	Reese Yeldon	TV film
2019	Mr. Mercedes	Danielle Sweeney	3 episodes
2019	The Magicians	Ismenie the Naiad	"The 4-1-1"
2021	Jupiter's Legacy	Jane	Recurring role (season 1)
