= Burn, Witch. Burn! (American Horror Story) =

- American Horror Story episode
- Episode no.: Season 3 Episode 5
- Directed by: Jeremy Podeswa
- Written by: Jessica Sharzer
- Production code: 3ATS05
- Original air date: November 6, 2013
- Running time: 42 minutes

Guest appearances
- Angela Bassett as Marie Laveau; Gabourey Sidibe as Queenie; Josh Hamilton as Hank Foxx; Jamie Brewer as Nan; Alexander Dreymon as Luke Ramsey; Leslie Jordan as Quentin Fleming; Robin Bartlett as Cecily Pembroke; Meg Steedle as Hospital Patient

Episode chronology
← Previous "Fearful Pranks Ensue"	Next → "The Axeman Cometh"
- American Horror Story: Coven

"Burn, Witch. Burn!" is the fifth episode of the third season of the anthology television series American Horror Story, which premiered on November 6, 2013, on the cable network FX.

This episode focuses on Fiona (Jessica Lange) exacting revenge on Myrtle Snow (Frances Conroy) after Cordelia (Sarah Paulson) is blinded.

== Plot ==
=== 1833 ===
Delphine overhears her three daughters plotting to kill her after she frightens away a potential suitor of her eldest daughter, Borquita, by showing him her chamber of horrors featuring slaves' body parts. Later that night, Delphine's slaves drag the daughters out of their beds and imprison them in her torture chamber. Delphine tells her daughters that she will release them in a year.

=== 2013 ===
At the academy, Luke, believing that Marie's zombies are Halloween pranksters, goes outside to turn them away and is struck in the back with an axe. Nan runs out to save Luke, before Zoe rescues them by using a chainsaw to fight off the zombies. Seeing a zombified Borquita through the kitchen window, Delphine opens the door to talk to her, and she grabs Delphine by the neck. When Borquita corners Queenie, Delphine kills Borquita with a fire poker through the heart. Zoe's chainsaw runs out of gas, and as a zombie lurches towards her, she casts a new spell that causes the zombie to fall to the ground, breaking Marie's spell.

Following the acid attack, Cordelia is hospitalized and Fiona is informed that the doctors could not save Cordelia's eyesight. When Hank makes it to the hospital and touches Cordelia's hand, she has a vision of him having sex with Kaylee, having developed the power of second sight.

The Council returns to the academy and demands that Fiona abdicate her Supremacy, noting that the coven has been under attack since her arrival. Fiona refuses and accuses Myrtle of the acid attack on Cordelia, showing acid burns on Myrtle's hand as proof. The other two Council members, Cecily and Quentin, sentence Myrtle to burn. The coven and the Council walk out to a quarry where Myrtle is tied up to a stake and doused in gasoline. Fiona flicks her lit cigarette at Myrtle and her body goes up in flames, killing her. Back at the house, it is revealed that Queenie dipped her hand in sulfuric acid at a key moment during Fiona's interrogation, framing Myrtle. Fiona flatters Queenie, offering to mentor her and suggesting that she could become the next Supreme.

At the quarry, Misty Day finds Myrtle's charred corpse and uses her powers of resurgence to bring her back to life.

== Reception ==
"Burn, Witch. Burn!" received a 2.2 18–49 ratings share and was watched by 3.80 million viewers, winning the night for cable.

Rotten Tomatoes reports a 94% approval rating, based on 16 reviews. The critical consensus reads, "Philosophical exploration of maternal challenges and a challenging, extraordinary turn for Kathy Bates make "Burn, Witch. Burn!" an excellent – albeit weird – hour of television." Emily VanDerWerff of The A.V. Club gave the episode a B+ rating, saying, "The episodes have all been packed with incident, with crazy moments and crazy twists, but there's not yet a center, and without a center, things cannot, well... you know." Matt Fowler from IGN gave the episode an 8.4/10 rating, calling it a great episode, saying, "This week's episode of Coven gave us a half great/half confusing zombie attack and some emotional moments involving mothers feeling shame and regret."

The episode was chosen as one of The Atlantic's Best TV Episodes of 2013.
