= Corrina, Corrina (film) =

1994 American film directed by Jessie Nelson

- Theatrical release poster
- Directed by: Jessie Nelson
- Written by: Jessie Nelson
- Produced by: Paula Mazur; Jessie Nelson; Steve Tisch
- Starring: Whoopi Goldberg; Ray Liotta; Tina Majorino; Wendy Crewson; Larry Miller; Joan Cusack; Don Ameche
- Cinematography: Bruce Surtees
- Edited by: Lee Percy
- Music by: Rick Cox
- Production company: New Line Cinema
- Distributed by: New Line Cinema
- Release date: August 12, 1994
- Running time: 115 minutes
- Country: United States
- Language: English
- Budget: $10-15 million
- Box office: $20.1 million

Corrina, Corrina is a 1994 American comedy-drama film set in the Los Angeles suburbs of the 1950s about a widower (Ray Liotta) who hires a housekeeper/nanny (Whoopi Goldberg) to care for his daughter (Tina Majorino). It was written and directed by Jessie Nelson, in her feature film directing debut. It was the final film in which Don Ameche starred; he died shortly after filming was completed.

Corrina, Corrina was released by New Line Cinema on August 12, 1994. The film received mixed reviews from critics and grossed $20.1 million against a $10-15 million budget.

== Plot ==
In 1959 Los Angeles, jingle writer Manny Singer is a recent widower with a young daughter, Molly, who, grieving the death of her mother Annie, refuses to speak. Manny decides to hire a housekeeper-nanny to help fill the void of his wife's absence as he returns to work.

Interviewees reveal characteristics that make the choice difficult. Molly does not like the first housekeeper hired; she quickly gets fired after crawling into bed with Manny, rationalizing that performing a wife’s duties entitles her to a wife’s privileges.

African-American Corrina Washington then interviews for the position. Since Molly responds well to her, Manny hires Corrina, who quickly forms a strong bond with Molly. Corrina works out a system for Molly to communicate "yes" or "no" by one or two nose taps, without having to speak. To help Molly heal from her mother's death, Corrina tells Molly that her mother is in heaven. Atheist Manny, whose wife was also atheist, objects to religious indoctrination. Spending time with Corrina's family, who welcome her into their home, however, Molly begins to attend church.

At an office party, Manny is introduced to Jenny, a perky divorcee with two young sons. Still struggling with losing Annie, Manny is not ready to date. Corrina's sister, Jevina, encourages her to date Anthony, a man of their race, but Corrina shows no interest.

A grief-stricken Molly returns to an all-white school, where she is mocked for adding Corrina, the maid, to her family picture. Desperate to go home, she runs into Corrina's arms at the end of the day. That night, when Molly has a nightmare, Corrina tells Molly that she is allowed to be mad at her mother for dying. Manny admits how hurt he is about losing Annie and how much he misses her too. When Corrina returns home late after dealing with Molly’s trauma, Jevina chastises her for spending too much unpaid time with her employer’s family.

Molly begs Corrina to let her stay home from school, and Corrina secretly agrees, taking Molly along on her second job cleaning other clients' homes. As Corrina becomes increasingly involved with Molly and Manny, she becomes indispensable, even helping Manny develop a new jingle and rhyme for advertising client Jello. Slowly Manny and Corrina discover they are compatible, sharing similar values, humor, and a love of music. After a successful advertising campaign, Manny comes home with flowers for Molly and Corrina, with plans for a celebratory dinner at a restaurant. Their celebration is interrupted by a visit from Jenny, and Corrina leaves when Manny does not disclose their prior plans to Jenny.

The next day, when Corrina arrives at work, Manny apologizes for allowing Jenny's uninvited visit to change their plans. They argue like a couple to the extent that upon its conclusion they unconsciously share a kiss on the cheek, witnessed by Manny's nosey neighbor, as Manny leaves for work. That night, after Molly goes to bed, Corrina and Manny talk about their absent spouses, share a moonlight dance, and kiss, observed by a spying Molly. Molly asks her grandfather, Harry, to make sure that Manny marries Corrina. As Corrina and Manny fall in love, they face prejudice as an interracial couple.

After weeks of allowing Molly to play hooky from school, Corrina tells her that she must return to school the next week. When Manny receives a call from Molly’s school, he is furious at the deception. Reminding Corrina that she is not Molly's mother, he fires her; Molly becomes withdrawn again.

After Harry dies, Manny ponders another loss. After Harry’s funeral, Manny visits Corrina at her house to inform her of his death and to properly apologize. After Manny's initially unsuccessful attempt at reconciliation, Corrina overhears Manny’s plea to God to help him out. She informs him that she quits as his employee, and he assures her that she has been replaced. After embracing and kissing, she brings him inside to formally meet her family.

Meanwhile, Molly is at home singing "This Little Light of Mine" to cheer up her grandmother, Eva, who joins in to please her. While they sing, Manny and Corrina return, and Molly joyfully runs to Corrina.

== Cast ==
- Whoopi Goldberg as Corrina Washington
- Ray Liotta as Manny Singer
- Tina Majorino as Molly Singer
- Wendy Crewson as Jenny Davis
- Larry Miller as Sid
- Erica Yohn as Eva Singer
- Jenifer Lewis as Jevina Washington
- Joan Cusack as Jonesy
- Don Ameche as Harry Singer
- Harold Sylvester as Frank
- Steven Williams as Anthony T. Williams
- Patrika Darbo as Wilma the Car Hop
- Lucy Webb as Shiri
- Courtland Mead as Howard
- Asher Metchik as Lewis
- Karen Leigh Hopkins as Liala Sheffield
- Brent Spiner as Brent Witherspoon
- Curtis Williams as Percy
- Briahnna Odom as Lizzie
- Lynette Walden as Annie Singer

== Release ==
The film was a moderate box office success, grossing $20,160,000 in the U.S.

== Reception ==
The film received polarized reviews from many film critics criticizing Nelson's failure to fully address the complications surrounding a romantic interracial relationship in the 1950s. Roger Ebert confessed that he enjoyed it but wrote:

...seems almost as shy as the characters about the charged issues of race and romance. After it was over I felt that, yes, it was warm and good-hearted, but there was more of a story there to be told.

Janet Maslin of The New York Times praised the actors and actresses for their work on it but echoed a similar criticism regarding Manny and Corrina's relationship:

The affection between them is evident, but not even by the end of her story has Ms. Nelson decided what sort of affection it is. That may be true to life, but for an otherwise mainstream movie, it's trouble.

On Rotten Tomatoes it holds a 37% rating based on 19 reviews.

=== Year-end lists ===
- Honorable mention – John Hurley, Staten Island Advance
