= Jo Wilson (Grey's Anatomy) =

Fictional character

Dr. Jo Wilson
- Grey's Anatomy character
- Camilla Luddington as Jo Wilson
- First appearance: Going, Going, Gone (9.01); September 27, 2012 (as recurring cast) "Seal Our Fate" (10.01); September 26, 2013 (as series regular)
- Created by: Shonda Rhimes
- Portrayed by: Camilla Luddington

In-universe information
- Aliases: Josephine Alice Wilson (antecedently as Jo Karev); Brooke Stadler
- Title(s): M.D., F.A.C.S.
- Occupation: OB/GYN resident at Grey Sloan Memorial Hospital (seasons 17–present); Attending general surgeon at Grey Sloan Memorial Hospital (seasons 16–present); Chief Resident fellow (season 15); Surgical resident (season 10–14); Surgical intern (season 9) at Seattle Grace Mercy West Hospital
- Family: Vicki Ann Rudin (biological mother); Alexandra Rudin (half-sister); Josh Rudin (half-brother)
- Spouses: Paul Stadler (m. 2004; died 2018) Alex Karev (m. 2018; div. 2020) Atticus Lincoln (m. 2025)
- Significant others: Chris Cleaver (ex-boyfriend); Jason Myers (ex-boyfriend); Todd Eames (ex-boyfriend); Levi Schmitt (one night stand); Jackson Avery (ex-friend with benefits)
- Children: Luna Ashton Wilson (adoptive daughter); Peyton Lincoln (daughter); Hattie Lincoln (daughter)
- Relatives: Martha Tomlinson (cousin); Scout Derek Shepherd Lincoln (step-son)
- Born: 1987

Josephine "Jo" Brooke Wilson (previously Karev) and formerly Brooke Stadler, M.D., F.A.C.S., is a character from the medical drama television series Grey's Anatomy, which airs on the American Broadcasting Company (ABC) in the United States. The character was created by series producer Shonda Rhimes and is portrayed by actor Camilla Luddington. She was introduced in the Season 9 premiere episode, "Going, Going, Gone", as a surgical intern at Seattle Grace Mercy West Hospital, later renamed Grey Sloan Memorial in the same season. Luddington's character was initially conceptualized as the new love interest for Justin Chambers' character, Alex Karev.

In the storyline, Jo befriends Alex, bonding over their similarly troubled childhoods, which eventually blossoms into a relationship and later marriage. Jo's abandonment issues and her story as a domestic abuse survivor have been central themes in her character development. Other significant storylines include her struggles with mental health, particularly after discovering she is a product of rape and facing rejection from her biological mother. Her real name is later revealed to be Brooke, and she is estranged from her abusive husband, Paul Stadler (Matthew Morrison), from whom she fled to start a new life in Seattle.

Jo's character has received mixed-to-positive reviews from both fans and critics alike, with praise for the strong and sensitive storylines, but criticism for her "irrational" and "over-emotional" nature.

== Storylines ==
Jo is introduced in the ninth season as an intern who initially clashes with Alex Karev (Justin Chambers). However, during Miranda Bailey's (Chandra Wilson) wedding, they bond over their shared difficult childhoods. As the season progresses, their friendship deepens, and Alex develops feelings for Jo. In the episode "Love Turns You Upside Down", after Jo assaults a parent for attempting to abandon her baby, she reveals to Alex that she was left at a fire station when she was two weeks old. Jo explains that she was passed around foster families until she began living in her car at age 16. She shares that Ms. Schmidt, a high school teacher, was the only person who ever cared about her and helped her succeed academically. Ms. Schmidt was also the one who gave Jo the watch she wears when she started working at the hospital. Alex compliments the watch and sits beside her, sharing a quiet moment of understanding. In the penultimate episode of season nine, "Readiness is All", Jo gets into an altercation with her then-boyfriend Jason Myers (Charles Michael Davis), revealing he physically abused her. She fought him off, and he hit his head on the fireplace. Alex convinces Jason not to press charges. In the finale, "Perfect Storm", Alex confesses his feelings to Jo, and they share a kiss.

By Season 10, Jo is a resident and is in a relationship with Alex.

In Season 11, Jo becomes frustrated with Meredith Grey (Ellen Pompeo) growing closer to Alex after Cristina Yang's (Sandra Oh) departure, feeling sidelined.

In Season 12, Jo finds an invoice from the fertility clinic where Alex and his ex-wife Izzie Stevens (Katherine Heigl) stored fertilized embryos when she had cancer. This discovery leads Jo to question whether her relationship with Alex is real, but Alex reassures her that his relationship with Izzie is in the past. Alex proposes to Jo, but she rejects him, revealing her frustration that he often prioritizes Meredith over her. In the season finale, "Family Affair", Jo drunkenly confesses to Andrew DeLuca (Giacomo Gianniotti) that she is already married and cannot marry Alex because she is estranged from her abusive husband, Paul Stadler (Matthew Morrison), having fled him to start a new life in Seattle. Alex walks in on Jo and DeLuca in a compromising situation, misinterprets it, and brutally attacks DeLuca, believing him to be assaulting Jo.

In the Season 13 episode "You Haven't Done Nothin'", Jo reveals to Alex that she is still married, and explains that she never told him because she feared he would attack her husband and end up in jail. Later, it is revealed that Jo's real name is Brooke and that Paul Stadler is her abusive husband.

In Season 14, Jo and Alex reconcile, and she confronts her abusive past when Paul returns with a new fiancée, Jenny, who Jo suspects is also being abused. Paul is later involved in a hit-and-run accident and dies from second-impact syndrome after an altercation in the hospital. Jo donates his organs and finally finds closure. Jo and Alex get married in the Season 14 finale, "All of Me".

In Season 15, Jo becomes a general surgical fellow. In the episode "Silent All These Years", Jo tracks down her birth mother, Vicki Rudin (Michelle Forbes), and discovers that she is the product of rape. This revelation sends Jo into a deep depression, and by the season finale, she voluntarily checks into a psychiatric ward.

In Season 16, Jo emerges from treatment and legally marries Alex, after realizing they never signed the marriage license. She also becomes an attending surgeon. However, Alex leaves Seattle and eventually reveals through a letter that he has reconnected with Izzie, who had his children via their frozen embryos. He leaves Jo his shares in Grey Sloan Memorial and tells her she deserves better, but that he wants to be a father to his twins with Izzie. Jo is devastated but vows to rise above it.

In Season 17, Jo begins a brief friends with benefits relationship with Jackson Avery (Jesse Williams), which ends when he moves to Boston to take over the Catherine Fox Foundation. Around the same time, Jo treats a premature baby named Luna, who loses her mother during childbirth. Jo grows attached to Luna and decides to switch specialties from general surgery to OB-GYN. Jo applies to adopt Luna but is initially turned down due to a failed background check. Determined to become Luna's mother, Jo gets her friend Atticus "Link" Lincoln (Chris Carmack) to temporarily foster Luna, and she is eventually granted full custody. Jo moves into a new apartment with Luna to start their life together.

== Development ==
In August 2012, it was announced that Camilla Luddington, Gaius Charles, and Tina Majorino had been cast as Jo Wilson, Shane Ross, and Heather Brooks, respectively, the new interns at Seattle Grace-Mercy West. TV Guide later reported that, despite the number of recurring cast members being added to Grey's Anatomy for the new season, Camilla Luddington was the only actress with an option to become a series regular.

Luddington had met Grey's Anatomy creator Shonda Rhimes a few months before the auditioning process for Jo Wilson but missed the actual audition due to a scheduling conflict. "I had a pilot called Gilded Lilys that I tested for, so I knew [Rhimes] a few months before," Luddington explained, according to TVLine. "When I went in [for Grey's], I actually missed the auditions because I was at Comic Con for Tomb Raider. I heard that Shonda had wanted me to come in, but I couldn't make it." The casting directors did not find the right fit for the role during that time. "That Monday, they said they still hadn't found anybody," Luddington shared, revealing that she was given the opportunity to try out for the part. She described the casting process for the medical drama as fast, saying, "I went in, and my first scene was kind of flirty. My second scene was me just blabbering a lot of medical dialogue. I probably heard two days later that I got the role."

Luddington later revealed that the production team told her they would write the characters’ stories based on their real personalities. "They had told me they were going to write our stories just off our personalities, so I guess I come across as a garbage eater or something," she joked, referencing Jo's street smarts. "They had decided after they cast me that I would be Karev's new love interest. It was interesting. I had never been cast that way before."

She also shared that her first scene with Meredith Grey (Ellen Pompeo), was cut because she had forgotten her lines due to nerves and her admiration for the show. Luddington believed her role would be cut entirely by the end of the day, but fortunately, only the scene was removed.

=== Characterization and development ===
Luddington describes Jo as a character who has "navigated through her life always looking over her shoulder" due to her estranged abusive husband. Showrunner Krista Vernoff described Jo as "resilient".

Regarding the domestic abuse storyline, Luddington shed light on how Meredith Grey (Ellen Pompeo) supported Jo, despite their past differences as colleagues.

"That played out amazing. The moment where Jo is watching Paul manipulate people and he is so charming and confident and suggesting that Jo, in her past, had not been believed? He finds subtle ways to undermine her — saying that she was a party girl and alcoholic. In that moment when Jo runs out from the gallery and interrupts them, she didn't believe Meredith would believe her. They had a rocky relationship in the past. But it was this incredible moment for Jo when Meredith turns around and tells her, "I know who you are." That's when Jo breaks down because I don't know how often — if ever — she's heard that."

In an interview with Bustle, Luddington noted the connection between her character's domestic abuse storyline and the #MeToo and Time's Up movements, which were gaining momentum at the time. She described the storyline as one of women "no longer being silent, and women finding the strength to use their voice and to be heard and to be believed." While the domestic abuse storyline had already been in development for over a season, and the headlines for the movements went viral during the filming of those episodes, Luddington found the timing to be serendipitous.

Krista Vernoff, and myself and all the writers, because it's been such a long time coming, there have been so many conversations with domestic abuse organizations. [...] even just the words and the dialogue that we wanted to use in several scenes, we were just particular with it, because [...] we wanted to tell this story right, and also educate people that have misconceptions about domestic abuse, who it happens to, and what it looks like.

— Luddington on the language used in depicting her domestic abuse storyline.

The character's reunion with her abusive husband, portrayed by Matthew Morrison, showcases the illusion often created by domestic abusers. Showrunner Krista Vernoff commented on the casting choice of Morrison, known for more charming roles on Glee, as being perfect to depict a character who could deceive others who were not the direct victims of his violence. Luddington noted that Jo was "paralyzed" when confronted by her estranged ex-husband, highlighting the "manipulative" nature of Morrison's character, which affected those around him.

In the wake of Justin Chambers' abrupt departure from the series, Vernoff discussed her decision to divorce Jo and Alex. She felt that keeping Jo married to an off-screen character would have been a disservice to Luddington, who deserved more layered and dynamic storylines. Vernoff explained, "It wasn't fair to her to keep her married to a character who was off screen. It would absolutely eliminate [the chance for her to play] so many colors that she is so good at playing," adding that giving Alex a happy ending with Izzie "was so clearly the right course." The decision to write Alex off by reuniting him with Izzie was described as an obvious choice in the writers' room.

Vernoff also commented on the choice not to further explore Jo's depression after Alex left her. She explained, "[Camilla] had so beautifully gone through many months of very dark storytelling, and I didn't want any of us to watch Jo go into a hole again." Vernoff added that Jo's reaction to learning the truth about Alex made sense because "not knowing can be so much worse than a very painful truth." After spending so much time in the dark about Alex's whereabouts, Jo found relief in finally getting an answer, even if it was painful. Vernoff noted that this closure allowed Jo to begin moving on, as she had already been grieving the relationship in the weeks leading up to Alex's revelation.

== Reception ==
=== Critical reception ===
In her review of the Season 12 episode "I Choose You", Lauren Hoffman expressed that while she enjoyed Jo's scenes with Alex, she found Jo's reaction to the discovery of Alex and Izzie's embryos "really confusing". Hoffman felt that Jo jumped to a false conclusion, especially after Alex explained that he had agreed to fertilize the eggs a long time ago. She believed that Jo, being "pragmatic enough," would "understand the big picture here" and criticized the character for being "absently upset with him until the end of the episode".

For the domestic abuse episode "1-800-799-7233", Ariana Romero of Refinery29 praised Luddington's "intensely evocative performance without saying a word" during the scene where Jo is confronted by her estranged ex-husband. Romero commended the camerawork for allowing viewers to step into the shoes of a domestic abuse survivor, emphasizing how it centers on Jo's "bewildered, horrified, and shocked face" as Paul's voice sounds distant, "like she's hearing it through a seashell." Romero also highlighted the gaslighting tactics Paul uses, with his first remark being that Jo looks "better" and "It looks like you finally got the help you needed".

Jo's development, particularly in the episode "Silent All These Years", which deals with the sensitive subject of sexual assault, was widely acclaimed. Digital Spy, in a review published nine months later, called it a "highly emotional episode for Jo". Abby Gardner of Glamour described the episode as "emotional, powerful, and, I hope, educational". Amanda Bell of TV Guide described Jo's scenes with her mother, portrayed by Michelle Forbes, as "unspeakably upsetting" and called the revelation of Jo's conception "earth-shattering".

However, not all commentary on Jo's character has been positive. Maggie Fremont of Vulture criticized Jo's portrayal following Alex's departure, stating, "Poor Jo! And poor me for having to sympathize with a character I can't stand, you know? Jo's letter truly sucks," referring to the impersonal nature of the letter Alex left her. Jasmine Blu of TV Fanatic was similarly critical, remarking that Jo's "Woe is Jo hours" were "irritating" and stating that "so much of Alex's storylines in the last few seasons have been playing second to Jo."
