= Gone Are the Days (2018 film) =

- Film poster
- Directed by: Mark Landre Gould
- Starring: Lance Henriksen; Tom Berenger; Meg Steedle; Danny Trejo
- Distributed by: Lionsgate Home Entertainment
- Release date: April 10, 2018
- Running time: 99 minutes
- Country: United States
- Language: English

Gone Are the Days is a 2018 American Western film directed by Mark Landre Gould and starring Lance Henriksen, Tom Berenger, Meg Steedle and Danny Trejo. It is Gould's feature directorial debut.

== Cast ==
- Lance Henriksen as Taylon Flynn
- Billy Lush as Virgil
- Danny Trejo as "River Man"
- Steve Railsback as Jaden
- Meg Steedle as Heidi
- Tom Berenger as Sheriff Will
- Lulu Wilson as Sally Anne
- Jamie McShane as Dr. Jenkins
- Carter Hastings as Jonathan
- Jackson Dunn as Henry

== Release ==
The film was released on Blu-ray and digital platforms on April 10, 2018.
