= Camilla Luddington =

British actress (born 1983)

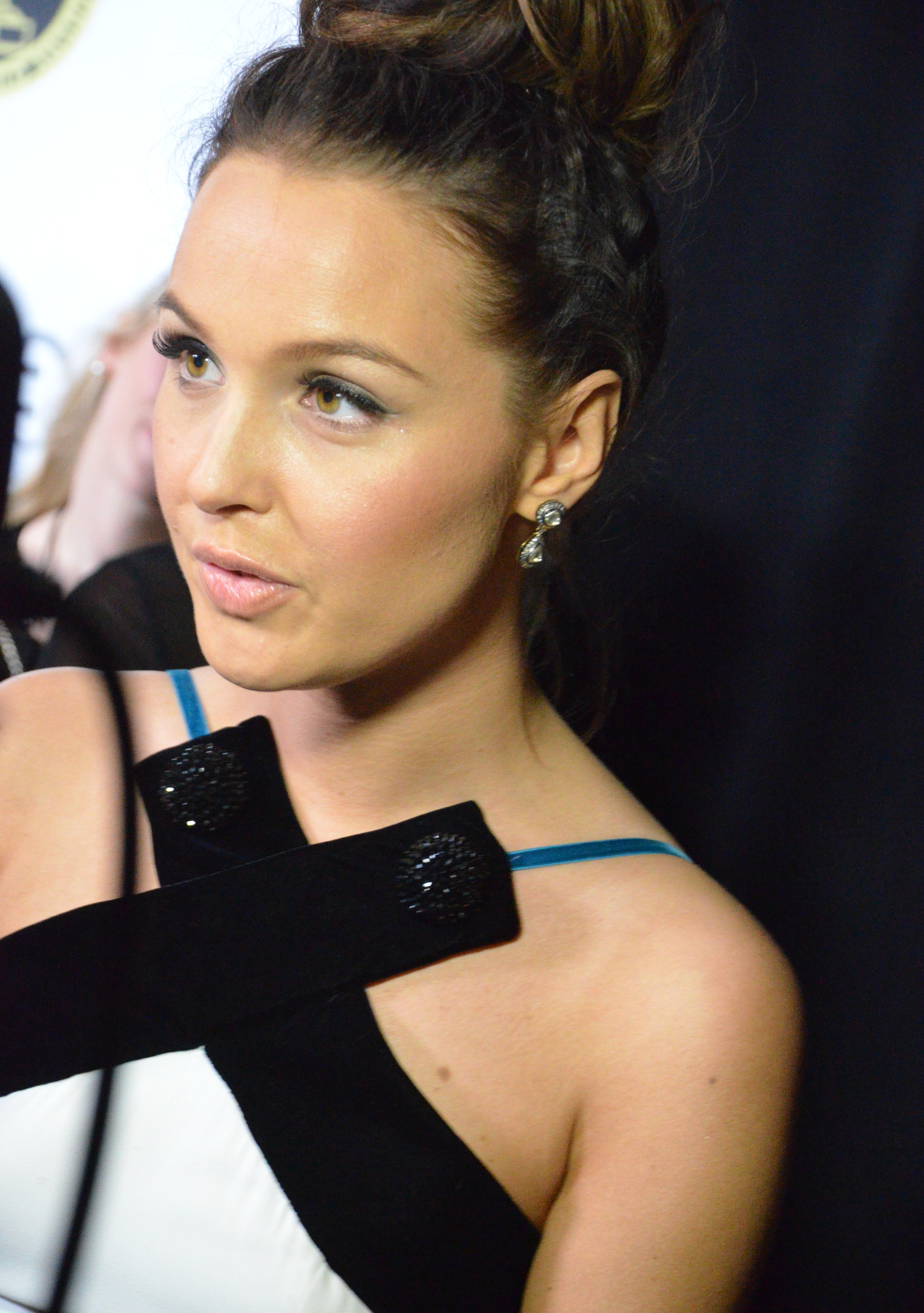
- Luddington in 2014
- Born: 15 December 1983 (age 42); Ascot, Berkshire, England
- Citizenship: United Kingdom; United States
- Education: Italia Conti Academy of Theatre Arts
- Occupation: Actress
- Years active: 2007–present
- Spouse: Matthew Alan (m. 2019)
- Children: 2

Camilla Anne Luddington (born 15 December 1983) is an English actress, best known for her role as Dr. Jo Wilson in the ABC medical drama series Grey's Anatomy (since 2012) and her role as Lara Croft in the Tomb Raider Survivor trilogy video games and Zatanna in the DC Animated Movie Universe.

== Early life ==
Luddington was born in Ascot, Berkshire, and at age 11 began studying at the Italia Conti Academy in England. She moved to suburban Austin, Texas, United States when she was fourteen, and attended Westwood High School for one year.

She returned to England after one year, and completed her education at The American International School in England (TASIS), in July 2002.

When she was nineteen, Luddington enrolled in Susquehanna University in Pennsylvania. However, she had not visited the university before she arrived as a student, and after six months, she left and transferred to the New York Film Academy.

In 2003, Luddington was part of the school's first one-year acting class program.

== Career ==
=== Film ===
Luddington had the lead role of Kate in William & Kate: The Movie (2011). In 2013, she appeared in the film The Pact II, in which she played a crime scene cleaner. In 2015, she joined the cast of The Healer as Cecilia.

=== Television ===
Luddington has worked mainly in the United States. Luddington joined the cast of the Showtime comedy-drama series Californication for its fifth season, playing a nanny. She joined the cast of season five of the HBO vampire drama True Blood, as Claudette Crane, a faerie. In July 2012, Luddington joined the cast of the ABC medical drama Grey's Anatomy as Dr. Jo Wilson, in a recurring role. In June 2013 it was announced that she would be a series regular from season ten onward. In October 2012, Luddington appeared on a Halloween special of E!'s fashion programme Fashion Police, alongside a panel of Joan Rivers, Kelly Osbourne, George Kotsiopoulos, and Kris Jenner.

=== Tomb Raider ===
In June 2012, Crystal Dynamics confirmed Luddington would voice Lara Croft in the video game Tomb Raider. Luddington originally went into the audition for Lara thinking she was auditioning for a project called "Cryptids" with a character, which may have been called Sara. Luddington reprised the role in the game's sequels, Rise of the Tomb Raider and Shadow of the Tomb Raider. As of 2025, Luddington has been replaced as the voice of Lara by Alix Wilton Regan.

== Personal life ==
On 21 October 2016, Luddington announced that she was expecting a child) with fellow actor and boyfriend Matthew Alan. Luddington announced their engagement on 17 January 2018. Luddington and Alan married on 17 August 2019. The couple has since had a second child together. In 2018, Luddington officially became a US citizen while retaining her British citizenship.

== Filmography ==
=== Film ===
Year	Title	Role	Notes
2007	A Couple of White Chicks at the Hairdresser	Receptionist #2	
2009	Behaving Badly	Flight Attendant	
2010	Pride and Prejudice and Zombies: Dawn of the Dreadfuls	Jane Bennet	Short film
2010	The Filming of Shakey Willis	Brooke	Short film
2014	The Pact 2	June Abbott	
2016	The Healer	Cecilia	
2017	Justice League Dark	Zatanna (voice)	Direct-to-video
2020	Justice League Dark: Apokolips War	Zatanna (voice)	Direct-to-video
2022	Constantine: The House of Mystery	Zatanna (voice)	Direct-to-video

=== Television ===
Year	Title	Role	Notes
2010	The Forgotten	Emma Clark / Jane Doe	Episode: "Train Jane"
2010	CSI: Crime Scene Investigation	Claire	Episode: "Lost & Found"
2010	Days of Our Lives	Tiffany	1 episode
2010	Big Time Rush	Rebecca	Episode: "Big Time Concert"
2011	The Defenders	Talia	Episode: "Nevada v. Wayne"
2011	Accidentally in Love	Sandra	TV film
2011	William & Kate: The Movie	Kate Middleton	TV film
2011	Friends with Benefits	Woman	Episode: "The Benefit of Friends"
2012	Serving Time	Cammy	Episode: "Fresh Meet"
2012	Friend Me	Brandi	Unaired pilot
2012	Californication	Lizzie	10 episodes
2012	True Blood	Claudette	6 episodes
2012–present	Grey's Anatomy	Dr. Jo Wilson / Brooke Stadler	Recurring role (season 9); Main cast (season 10–present); 253 episodes
2013	Tomb Raider: The Final Hours – A Story of Survival	Herself / Lara Croft	TV film
2019	Robot Chicken	Nadia, Agent Marshall (voice)	Episode: "Garfield Stockman in: A Voice Like Wet Ham"
2025	Celebrity Jeopardy!	Herself (Contestant)	

=== Video games ===
Year	Title	Role	Notes
2013	Tomb Raider	Lara Croft	Also motion capture
2015	Infinite Crisis	Supergirl, The Construct	Announcer
2015	Rise of the Tomb Raider	Lara Croft	Also motion capture
2018	Shadow of the Tomb Raider	Lara Croft	Also motion capture

== Accolades ==
Year	Association	Category	Nominated work	Result	References
2013	NAVGTR Awards	Lead Performance, Drama	Tomb Raider	Nominated	
2013	Spike Video Game Awards	Best Voice Actress	Tomb Raider	Nominated	
2015	NAVGTR Awards	Lead Performance, Drama	Rise of the Tomb Raider	Nominated	
2015	The Game Awards	Best Performance	Rise of the Tomb Raider	Nominated	
2016	19th Annual D.I.C.E. Awards	Outstanding Achievement in Character	Rise of the Tomb Raider	Won	
2018	Gamers' Choice Awards	Fan Favorite Female Voice Actor	Shadow of the Tomb Raider	Won	
