= Tina Majorino =

American actress (born 1985)

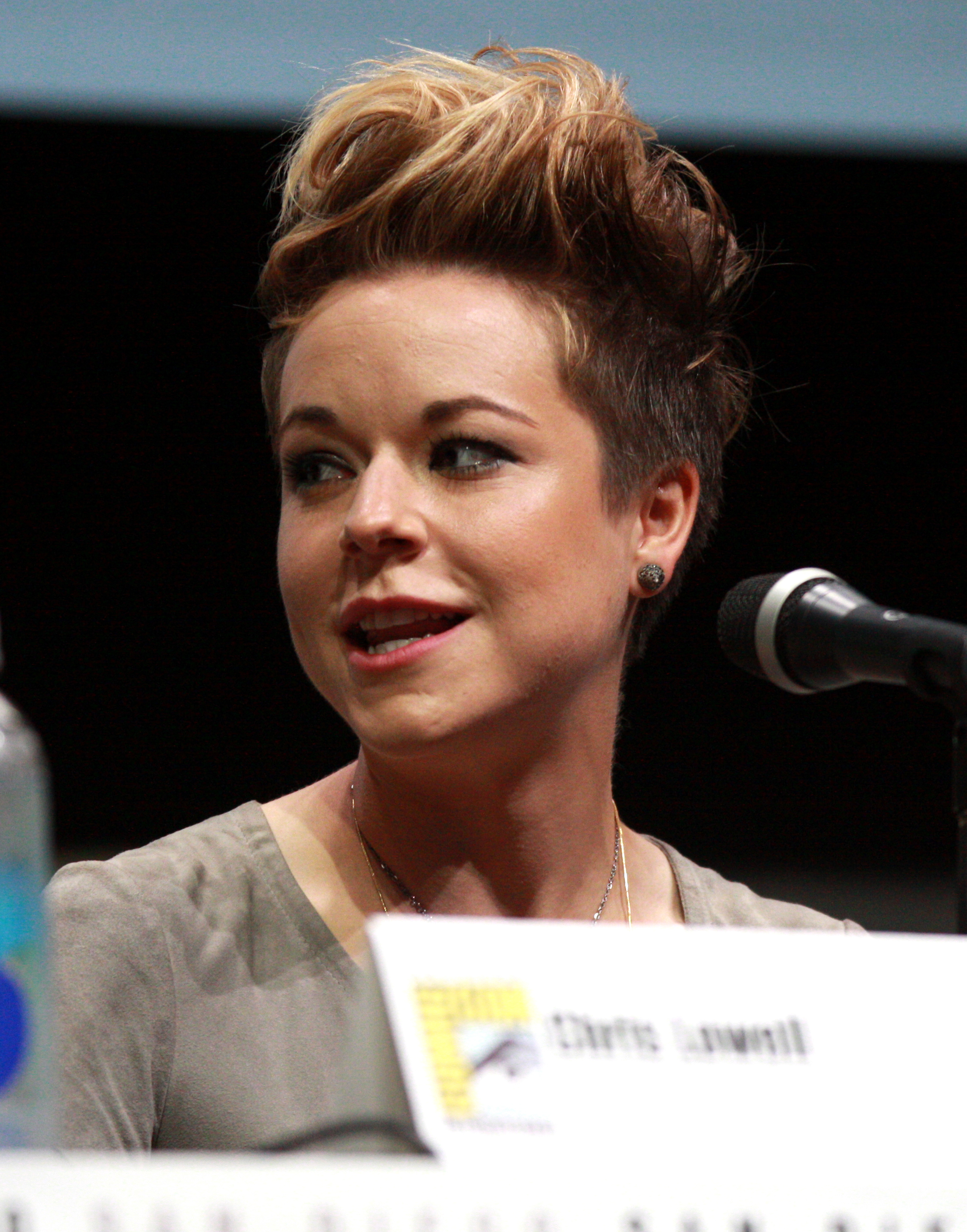
- Majorino at the 2013 San Diego Comic-Con
- Born: Albertina Marie Majorino; February 7, 1985 (age 41); Westlake Village, California, U.S.
- Occupation: Actress
- Years active: 1992–1999; 2004–present

Albertina Marie Majorino (/meɪdʒoʊˈriːnoʊ/ may-joh-REE-noh; born February 7, 1985) is an American actress. She started her career as a child actress, starring in films such as When a Man Loves a Woman, Corrina, Corrina, Andre, Waterworld and Alice in Wonderland.

After her early success as a child actress, she returned to acting at age 18 as the character Deb in the 2004 film Napoleon Dynamite. From 2004 to 2007, she portrayed Cindy "Mac" Mackenzie on Veronica Mars, and reprised the character in the 2014 spinoff film; she was offered the chance to play the character once again in the eight-episode fourth season in 2019, but turned it down. She has appeared in multiple television series, including Big Love, True Blood and Grey's Anatomy. She also played the part of Maggie Harris on the television series Legends. She later appeared in the recurring role of Florence in the television series Scorpion.

== Early life ==
Majorino was born on February 7, 1985, in Westlake Village, California, a city in Los Angeles County, to Sarah and Bob Majorino. She has Italian ancestry on her paternal side. Majorino has an older brother, Kevin, with whom she has formed a rock band, The AM Project.

== Career ==
Majorino began her acting career in a 1992 sitcom called Camp Wilder. Her first film role was in 1994's When a Man Loves a Woman. She subsequently starred in leading roles in the family films Corrina, Corrina and Andre, both of which were released in August 1994. Her next film was the 1995 action film Waterworld, playing a child named Enola.

She played the title role in the 1999 television film Alice in Wonderland. After Alice, she took time off from show business, later saying that she stopped acting so she would not miss out on her childhood: "I wanted to experience the things that a little kid can experience and get to know myself so when I came back I could be tough enough and strong enough to keep a good attitude, keep my head on straight and make the right decisions for myself and my family." She did not appear in another film until the 2004 cult film Napoleon Dynamite. From 2004 onward, she played a recurring role on UPN's series Veronica Mars as the computer-savvy Cindy "Mac" Mackenzie. She first appeared in the show's eighth episode, "Like a Virgin", and continued until the show's series finale, "The Bitch is Back". Show creator Rob Thomas created the role with her in mind. She had met Thomas while interviewing him for a report on one of his books. Majorino became a series regular in the show's third and final season. During her time on Veronica Mars, she also started appearing in a recurring role on the cable television series Big Love with Waterworld costar Jeanne Tripplehorn and fellow Veronica Mars cast members Amanda Seyfried and Kyle Gallner. In 2005, she appeared in the music video for the song "Blind" by rock group Lifehouse.

She started filming for The Deep End, a television show for ABC in 2009. She played the role of Addy Fisher, a meek, insecure first-year associate at a high-profile law firm. The show was canceled after only six episodes were aired.

She returned to television in 2011 playing the recurring role of Special Agent Genny Shaw on Bones. She also starred in the music video for "Fuckin' Perfect" by Pink.

In 2012, she reprised her role as Deb in the animated TV version of Napoleon Dynamite. She was also seen playing the role of the vampire Molly in Season 5 of the HBO television series True Blood, an uncredited role as a pregnant woman in the Fox show, Raising Hope, in an episode titled "Tarot Cards," and the role of intern Dr. Heather Brooks in Season 9 of the ABC series Grey's Anatomy, with her character being killed off in the two-part premiere of Season 10. In 2014 she appeared in the Veronica Mars film as her character Mac, a project financed by fans through Kickstarter. Majorino was approached to reprise the role of Mac when Veronica Mars was renewed for a fourth season by Hulu in 2019, but turned it down upon learning the role was essentially a cameo.

In an interview with Mental in 2022, Majorino talks about dealing with anxiety and how therapy, meditation, and setting boundaries has helped her finally find self-love.

== Filmography ==
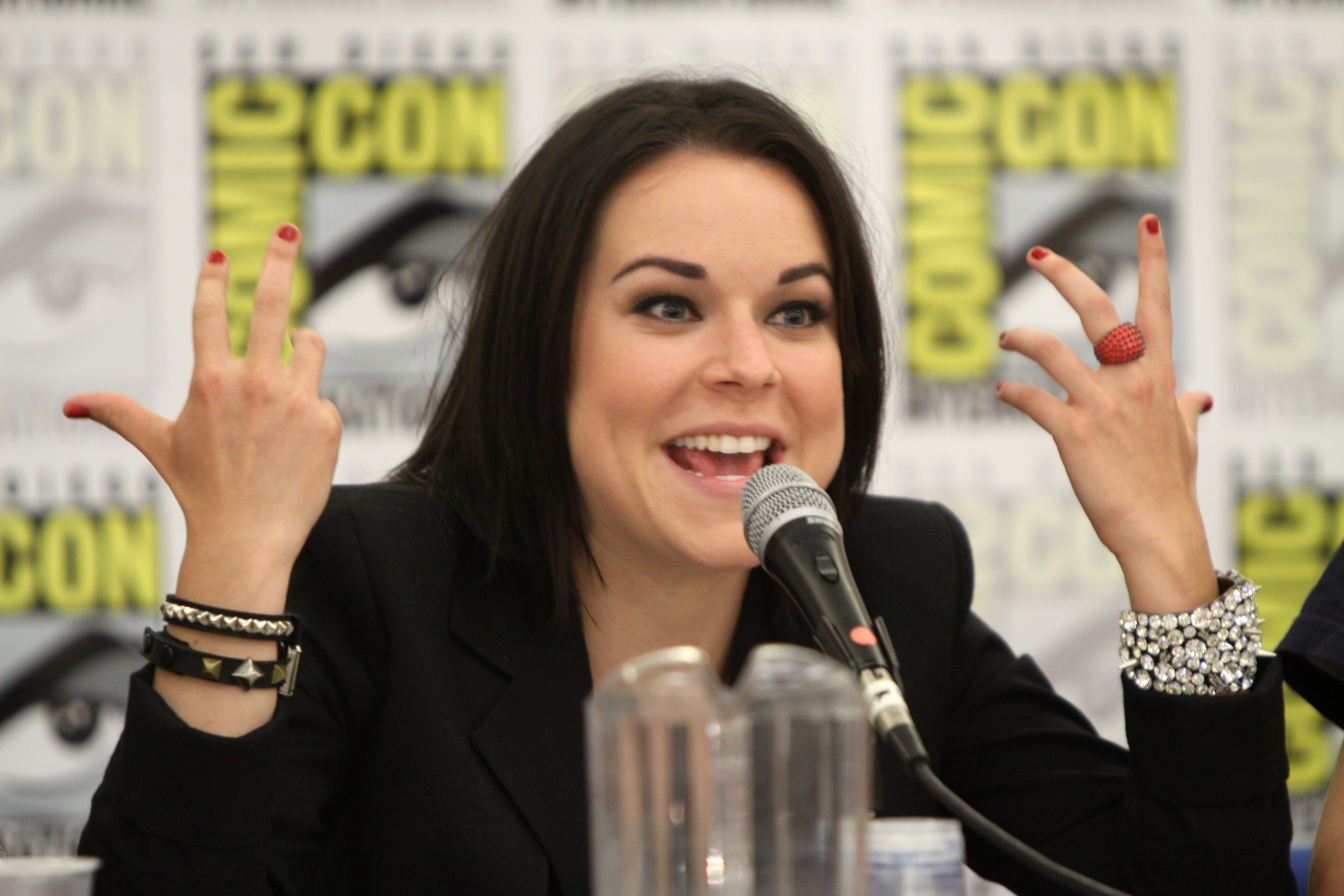
Majorino at the 2011 San Diego Comic-Con

=== Film ===
Year	Title	Role	Notes
1994	When a Man Loves a Woman	Jess Green	
1994	Corrina, Corrina	Molly Singer	
1994	Andre	Toni Whitney	
1995	Waterworld	Enola	
1997	Santa Fe	Crystal Thomas	
1999	Alice in Wonderland	Alice	
2004	Napoleon Dynamite	Deb	
2006	Think Tank	Sal	
2006	A Sharp	The Daughter	Short Film
2007	What We Do Is Secret	Michelle	
2012	Should've Been Romeo	Alice	
2014	Veronica Mars	Cindy "Mac" Mackenzie	

=== Television ===
Year	Title	Role	Notes
1992	ABC TGIF	Sophie	TV Series
1992–1993	Camp Wilder	Sophie Wilder	Main role (19 episodes)
1996	New York Crossing		Television film
1997	True Women	Young Euphemia Ashby	Television film
1997	Before Women Had Wings	Avocet Abigail 'Bird' Jackson	Television film
1997	Merry Christmas, George Bailey	Janie Bailey	Television film
1999	Alice in Wonderland	Alice	Television film
2004	Without a Trace	Serena Barnes / Andrews	Episode: "Lost and Found"
2004	Testing Bob	Allison Barrett	Television film
2004–2007	Veronica Mars	Cindy "Mac" Mackenzie	Recurring role (seasons 1–2); Main role (season 3); 33 episodes
2006–2011	Big Love	Heather Tuttle	Recurring role (26 episodes)
2010	The Deep End	Addy Fisher	Main role (6 episodes)
2010	In Security		Television film
2011	P!nk: Fuckin' Perfect	Adult Angel	Video short
2011	Castle	Reese Harmon	Episode: "One Life to Lose"
2011–2012	Bones	Special Agent Genevieve Shaw	Recurring role (seasons 6–7; 3 episodes)
2012	Napoleon Dynamite	Deb (voice)	Main role (6 episodes)
2012	True Blood	Molly	Recurring role (season 5; 6 episodes)
2012–2013	Grey's Anatomy	Dr. Heather Brooks	Recurring role (seasons 9–10; 22 episodes)
2014	You, Me & Her	Erin	Short
2014	If the Days of the Week Were People	Saturday	Video short
2014	Legends	Maggie Harris	Main role (season 1; 10 episodes)
2017–2018	Scorpion	Florence	Recurring role (season 4; 12 episodes)
2020	Into the Dark	Jenny	Episode: "Delivered"
2020	Etheria	Erin	Episode: "You Me & Her"
2022	The Good Doctor	Grace	Episode: "Cheat Day"
2025	Devil May Cry	Sentry	Voice role

=== Music videos ===
Year	Title	Artist	Director
2005	"Blind"	Lifehouse	Nigel Dick
2011	"Fuckin' Perfect"	P!nk	Dave Meyers
