= Grey's Anatomy season 23 =

Television season

Grey's Anatomy
- Season 23
- Promotional poster
- Showrunner: Meg Marinis
- Starring: Ellen Pompeo; Chandra Wilson; James Pickens Jr.; Caterina Scorsone; Camilla Luddington; Jason George; Chris Carmack; Anthony Hill; Alexis Floyd; Harry Shum Jr.; Adelaide Kane; Niko Terho; Trevor Jackson
- No. of episodes: 6

Release
- Original network: ABC
- Original release: October 15, 2026 – present

Season chronology
- ← Previous; Season 22

The twenty-third season of the American medical drama television series Grey's Anatomy was announced on March 30, 2026, and premiered in the United States on the American Broadcasting Company (ABC) on October 15, 2026.

This is the first season not to feature Kevin McKidd and Kim Raver as series regulars since the fifth and fifteenth seasons, respectively.

== Episodes ==
No. overall	No. in season	Title	Directed by	Written by	Original release date
467	1	"Collide"	Debbie Allen	Meg Marinis & Jess Righthand	October 15, 2026
468	2	"Slippin' and Slidin'"	Linda Klein	Michelle Lirtzman	October 22, 2026
469	3	"It's All Wrong, but It's All Right"	Debbie Allen	Jase Miles-Perez	October 29, 2026
470	4	"Love on the Brain"	Nefertite Nguvu	Scott D. Brown	November 5, 2026
471	5	"Stronger (What Doesn't Kill You)"	Jake Borelli	Zoanne Clack	November 12, 2026
472	6	"Till I Collapse"	Allison Liddi-Brown	Sandra Hamada	November 19, 2026
473	7	TBA	TBA	Julie Wong	January 7, 2027

== Cast and characters ==
=== Main ===
- Ellen Pompeo as Dr. Meredith Grey
- Chandra Wilson as Dr. Miranda Bailey
- James Pickens Jr. as Dr. Richard Webber
- Caterina Scorsone as Dr. Amelia Shepherd
- Camilla Luddington as Dr. Jo Wilson
- Jason George as Dr. Ben Warren
- Chris Carmack as Dr. Atticus "Link" Lincoln
- Anthony Hill as Dr. Winston Ndugu
- Alexis Floyd as Dr. Simone Griffith
- Harry Shum Jr. as Dr. Benson "Blue" Kwan
- Adelaide Kane as Dr. Jules Millin
- Niko Terho as Dr. Lucas Adams
- Trevor Jackson as Dr. Wes Bryant

=== Recurring ===
- Debbie Allen as Dr. Catherine Fox
- Scott Speedman as Dr. Nick Marsh
- Jennifer Landon as Dr. Toni Wright
- James Wolk as Dr. Seth Norton
- Jade Pettyjohn as Dr. Dani Spencer
- Sarah Levy as Corrie

== Production ==
=== Development ===
On March 30, 2026, ABC renewed the series for a twenty-third season with Meg Marinis' fourth year as showrunner. Season premiered on October 15, 2026 and is set to run for 13 episodes.

=== Casting ===
On March 25, 2026, it was announced that series regulars Kevin McKidd (Dr. Owen Hunt) and Kim Raver (Dr. Teddy Altman) would depart the series after the season finale of the previous season.

=== Filming ===
During production of the twenty-third season, cast member Harry Shum Jr. (Dr. Benson "Blue" Kawn), competed on the thirty-fifth season of Dancing with the Stars, partnered with professional dancer Jenna Johnson. Showrunner Meg Marinis stated that his participation in the competition did not affect his screen time, as filming was scheduled around his commitments to both shows.
