= Grey's Anatomy season 7 =

Season of television series

Grey's Anatomy
- Season 7
- DVD cover art for the seventh season of Grey's Anatomy
- Showrunners: Shonda Rhimes; Krista Vernoff
- Starring: Ellen Pompeo; Sandra Oh; Justin Chambers; Chandra Wilson; James Pickens Jr.; Sara Ramirez; Eric Dane; Chyler Leigh; Kevin McKidd; Jessica Capshaw; Kim Raver; Sarah Drew; Jesse Williams; Patrick Dempsey
- No. of episodes: 22

Release
- Original network: ABC
- Original release: September 23, 2010 – May 19, 2011

Season chronology
- ← Previous; Season 6 Next → Season 8

The seventh season of the American television medical drama Grey's Anatomy, began airing on September 23, 2010 on the American Broadcasting Company (ABC), and concluded on May 19, 2011 ending the season with a total of 22 episodes. The season was produced by ABC Studios, in association with Shondaland Production Company and The Mark Gordon Company; the showrunner being Shonda Rhimes and head writer Krista Vernoff.

The website Screen Rant ranked the season #10 on their 2023 ranking of the 19 Grey's Anatomy seasons.

== Synopsis ==
The season follows the aftermath of the season 6 shooting, in which Derek Shepherd (Patrick Dempsey), Alex Karev (Justin Chambers), Reed, and Charles are shot, with a total of 11 people dead. Cristina Yang (Sandra Oh) was the most affected by the shooting, quitting her job. Cristina and Owen later marry with "her person", the show's protagonist Meredith Grey (Ellen Pompeo), as her maid of honor. Meredith and Derek start a clinical trial for Alzheimer's disease, with Meredith suspecting that Richard Webber's (James Pickens Jr.) wife Adele (Loretta Devine) may have the condition. Arizona Robbins (Jessica Capshaw) leaves for Africa after getting a grant, leaving Callie Torres (Sara Ramirez) despondent. She sleeps with Mark Sloan (Eric Dane) and gets pregnant. Arizona returns, confessing her love for Callie. Meredith invalidates the trial by ensuring Adele gets the treatment, only to have Alex find out and tell Hunt, and Meredith responds by kicking Alex out of her house. Derek leaves Meredith with Zola. Lexie Grey (Chyler Leigh) decides to give Mark a second chance but later starts a relationship with Jackson Avery (Jesse Williams). Teddy Altman (Kim Raver) starts a relationship with Andrew Perkins (James Tupper), a trauma counselor, but later falls for her patient, Henry Burton. This season marks the first appearance of Caterina Scorsone as Derek's sister, Dr. Amelia Shepherd, who becomes a series regular in season 11.

The season ended with an average of 11.41 million viewers and was ranked #31 in overall viewership and was #9 in the 18-49 key demographic. Loretta Devine won the Outstanding Guest Actress in a Drama at the 63rd Primetime Emmy Awards. The season also garnered 7 nominations at the 37th People's Choice Awards and also won the Outstanding Drama Series at the NAACP Image Awards.

== Episodes ==
The number in the "No. in series" column refers to the episode's number within the overall series, whereas the number in the "No. in season" column refers to the episode's number within this particular season. "U.S. viewers in millions" refers to the number of Americans in millions who watched the episodes live. Each episode of this season is named after a song.

No. overall	No. in season	Title	Directed by	Written by	Original release date	Prod. code	U.S. viewers (millions)
127	1	"With You I'm Born Again"	Rob Corn	Krista Vernoff	September 23, 2010	701	14.32
A trauma counselor, Dr. Perkins, tries to help the hospital staff in the recovery and to assess each doctor's readiness to return to work. This episode includes flashback scenes, to events that happen between the shooting and the present time. Cristina and Owen plan their wedding, (his proposal is in this episode), while Meredith fails to get approved for surgery, as the counselor doubts her moving on. Derek quickly returns to work with adrenaline, but Meredith worries when he continuously speeds while driving. This recklessness costs him a seat at Owen and Cristina's wedding at the end of the episode.
128	2	"Shock to the System"	Tom Verica	William Harper	September 30, 2010	702	12.53
Meredith at last tells Derek about her miscarriage and is finally cleared to return to her surgical duties in the wake of the hospital shooting spree. Cristina experiences PTSD in the midst of an operation; and Bailey refuses to let Alex operate until he agrees to have the bullet in his chest removed. Several people are admitted to the ER after being struck by lightning.
129	3	"Superfreak"	Michael Pressman	Mark Wilding	October 7, 2010	703	12.75
Derek's sister, Amelia, shows up at the hospital, and things go awry between the siblings; Webber tries to help Alex with his trauma of elevators; Meredith and Derek try to help Cristina with her post-traumatic stress. Lexie, Bailey and Jackson have to hide their true feelings when they treat a man covered in warts, while Meredith and April treat a virgin with a condom stuck in her lungs. This episode concludes a crossover with Private Practice beginning with "Short Cuts". Caterina Scorsone's Amelia character is encouraged to visit Derek in the first hour.
130	4	"Can't Fight Biology"	Edward Ornelas	Peter Nowalk	October 14, 2010	704	12.11
Meredith and Derek receive some disturbing news from the obstetrician, and Lexie loses it when she notices Meredith and April getting closer. Meanwhile, a car crash brings in multiple traumas and Jackson tries using his physical attributes to get ahead in the operating room, while Cristina's self-doubt carries outside of the hospital and into her house hunting with Owen. A patient inspires Meredith to get tested for the gene for Alzheimer's, while Callie tries to figure out why Arizona doesn't like Mark, while working with Alex to find a way to save the leg of a talented ballet dancer.
131	5	"Almost Grown"	Chandra Wilson	Brian Tanen	October 21, 2010	705	10.97
Webber puts the residents in charge while the attending surgeons compete for a million-dollar grant, and Callie tries to psych everyone out. Derek tells Webber of his wish to start a clinical trial for Alzheimer's. Alex has a male patient who wants a breast reduction, while Jackson and Meredith compete for a solo surgery, and Cristina finds her voice for a borderline transplant patient.
132	6	"These Arms of Mine"	Stephen Cragg	Stacy McKee	October 28, 2010	706	10.79
A documentary film crew visits the hospital six months after the shooting to document the recovery process of doctors and patients. Mary Portman returns to the hospital to have Bailey perform her surgery. Meanwhile, Derek and other surgeons prepare to do a double arm transplant on a logger who lost his arms in an accident four years previously. Alex treats a young girl who is slowly dying that no other doctor has been able to cure up to now. Alex, however, looks for an alternative cure. Derek is able to operate and save the logger. In the end, Alex manages to find a treatment that involves the growth of a trachea in vitro and saves the life of the girl. After Arizona receives an elite medical grant based on a proposed project in Africa, she and Callie decide to go together. Although the surgery went well, Mary does not wakeup and Bailey is devastated.
133	7	"That's Me Trying"	Tony Phelan	Austin Guzman	November 4, 2010	707	11.92
Cristina is left alone to watch an ill patient while Teddy goes to retrieve his organ transplant. Owen puts the residents through a rigorous trauma certification drill. Mark and Lexie perform surgery on a woman who wants butt implants. Callie and Arizona prepare for their trip to Africa, but at the airport, Arizona says she does not want Callie to go, as she has been so ambivalent. Arizona ends the relationship. Cristina quits, explaining she doesn't want to be a surgeon anymore. Bailey tries to deal with the trauma of losing Mary.
134	8	"Something's Gotta Give"	Jeannot Szwarc	William Harper	November 11, 2010	708	11.13
Cristina tries to decorate her house for a housewarming party while the hospital welcomes a new Pediatrics Attending, Dr. Robert Stark. Alex and April become intimate after she stands up for him against Stark, but her nervousness ends up agitating him. As a result of this bad experience, April bursts into tears at Cristina's housewarming party. When Jackson learns about what happened to April, he starts punching Alex out of rage. Hunt and Teddy have to work on a patient from the world of global politics. Meanwhile, Derek advises Mark and others to not have an intervention for Cristina. When Cristina's party is held, no one can find her, although she is sat with Derek on the terraces discussing home decoration. Absent: Jessica Capshaw as Arizona Robbins due to maternity leave.
135	9	"Slow Night, So Long"	Rob Bailey	Zoanne Clack	November 18, 2010	709	11.46
The residents are on their own when they have to take a night-shift, and realize things go very differently at night. Meredith and Alex have to do a surgery neither are trained for when they can't get in touch with Stark, April deals with two teenagers who superglued themselves together, while Lexie and Jackson have two patients whose car was hit by a train. The attendings head to Joe's to celebrate Derek's grant for his clinical trial and are shocked when they see that Cristina has started work as a waitress there. Absent: Jessica Capshaw as Arizona Robbins due to maternity leave.
136	10	"Adrift and at Peace"	Allison Liddi-Brown	Tony Phelan & Joan Rater	December 2, 2010	710	11.02
Derek takes Cristina out on a fishing trip to help her with her problem. Teddy finds herself attracted to a patient who no longer has insurance. She attempts to get approval to do it pro bono, but when she has no luck going down that route she ends up making a shocking suggestion. Lexie deals with a nurse who refuses to take orders from her and realizes she has to ask Mark for help. Arizona comes back, but Callie shuts the door in her face.
137	11	"Disarm"	Debbie Allen	Krista Vernoff	January 6, 2011	711	11.64
The doctors of Seattle Grace-Mercy West have to treat victims of a mass student shooting at a nearby college, and are confronted with their own trauma memories. Cristina gets back to surgery by saving one of the wounded while riding the ambulance to the hospital. As most of the doctors work to save the shooting victims, Teddy learns she is operating on the shooter. Some staff leave the OR, but Cristina stays and settles in. Despite Jackson's anger at the shooter's actions, he comforts the shooter's mother who had no idea what her son was planning. In the end, the doctors learn that they were able to save all the victims.
138	12	"Start Me Up"	Mark Jackson	Natalie Krinsky	January 13, 2011	712	12.15
All the residents are appointed a med student for the day, whom they are supposed to teach. As the med students evaluate their teachers, they all receive negative evaluations, except for Alex. He has a fling with the young woman who had been assigned to him. Teddy faces difficulties as she has to make life-changing decisions for her patient, of whom she is the legal spouse. Arizona attempts to reconcile with Callie, but she refuses, finally revealing that she is pregnant with Mark's child.
139	13	"Don't Deceive Me (Please Don't Go)"	Kevin McKidd	Mark Wilding	February 3, 2011	713	11.18
Derek starts his Alzheimers clinical trial and reluctantly includes Meredith as an assistant. Bailey starts tweeting during her surgeries, a concept that Webber opposes. He approves it after seeing what a valuable teaching tool it can be, and accepts suggestions from surgeons outside Seattle who are monitoring the surgery. Mark tells Lexie about Callie's pregnancy, resulting in her refusal to continue their relationship. Callie is overanxious about the health of the fetus, and struggles with the roles to be played by the three adults.
140	14	"P.Y.T. (Pretty Young Thing)"	Steve Robin	Austin Guzman	February 10, 2011	714	10.47
Meredith and Lexie's father, Thatcher, is admitted to the hospital with kidney stones. Much to Lexie's shock, he is accompanied by a 20-year-old girlfriend, Danni. Alex conflicts with the hospital's newest OB/GYN, but unintentionally wins her respect by remaining concerned over a case from which she dismissed him. Mark tasks Avery to find out what is upsetting Lexie, causing Jackson to find Lexie frustrated about people around her making major life changes, such as her father and Mark, doesn't report back to Mark and uses this information to get closer to Lexie. Webber offers Meredith the chance to lead a clinical trial to test cultivated cells for diabetes treatment, which her mother had developed, but she chooses to remain on her Alzheimer trial with Derek.
141	15	"Golden Hour"	Rob Corn	Stacy McKee	February 17, 2011	715	10.24
Meredith runs the ER for a night, and time is shown to be critical. Meanwhile, Bailey sneaks off with Eli and gets into a little mischief, while Meredith grows concerned that Lexie isn't focusing properly. Everyone is surprised when the Webber's wife, Adele, shows up as one of the ER patients and Meredith comes to believe Adele may have Alzheimer's disease. Lucy starts to see a different side to Alex.
142	16	"Not Responsible"	Debbie Allen	Debora Cahn	February 24, 2011	716	9.13
Meredith must choose between her fertility treatments and her eyesight when she begins having trouble seeing, and stops the medication. Mark is emphatic about being consulted on decisions about the baby. After treating two cystic fibrosis patients, Lexie and Jackson enter into a relationship. April discovers there's more to Dr. Stark than first appears, while Webber continues to dismiss concerns over Adele's health when she suffers from another fall.
143	17	"This Is How We Do It"	Edward Ornelas	Peter Nowalk	March 24, 2011	717	10.28
Webber is desperate for Derek and Meredith to accept Adele into their Alzheimer's trial, and she is accepted. Meanwhile, Mark and Arizona have conflicting ideas of the kind of baby shower Callie wants, Teddy is freaked out when Henry has another health complication -- leaving them both a little exposed. Things begin to heat up between Alex and Lucy, while April turns Stark down after comments from the other residents. The competitiveness among the residents for the Chief Resident position is amplified when Webber receives the green light for his diabetes clinical trial.
144	18	"Song Beneath the Song"	Tony Phelan	Shonda Rhimes	March 31, 2011	718	13.09
In a series first, diegetic music is used extensively in this episode. While driving to a weekend B&B, Arizona proposes to Callie. The two are hit by a truck, and Callie suffers injuries that threaten both her life and her fetus. As the hospital staff work together to try and save them both, Callie hallucinates both an uninjured version of herself and the other doctors singing. Various individuals take the lead in singing such songs as "Chasing Cars" (Snow Patrol), "Breathe" (Anna Nalick), "How to Save a Life" (The Fray) and "The Story" (Brandi Carlile). Kate Walsh makes a guest appearance as Addison Montgomery.
145	19	"It's a Long Way Back"	Steve Robin	William Harper	April 28, 2011	719	10.67
Everyone pulls together to help Callie and baby Sofía on their painstaking journeys to recovery in hopes of allowing mother and baby to finally meet. The sudden death of a clinical trial patient has Derek proceeding cautiously, while Meredith makes a calculated, risky move. Alex treats a cranky old rich woman dying of cancer and gets an idea for a grandiose endeavor that is sure to get him the Chief Resident spot. Teddy is pleasantly surprised by the return of a familiar face.
146	20	"White Wedding"	Chandra Wilson	Stacy McKee	May 5, 2011	720	10.11
As Callie and Arizona's wedding approaches, the couple quickly realize that the day they've been looking forward to is not turning out the way they'd envisioned. Meanwhile, Alex continues to make the other residents jealous as he appears to be the top contender for Chief Resident. While Dr. Andrew Perkins presents Teddy with a very tempting proposition, Meredith and Derek make a life-changing decision.
147	21	"I Will Survive"	Tom Verica	Zoanne Clack	May 12, 2011	721	9.63
Personal and work pressures are adding up and have Meredith visibly on edge, Owen conducts formal interviews for the Chief Resident position, Cristina grows increasingly defiant, Alex and Lucy's undefined relationship gets tested, and Jackson suddenly backs out of Webber's diabetes trial.
148	22	"Unaccompanied Minor"	Rob Corn	Debora Cahn	May 19, 2011	722	9.89
News of Meredith's dishonesty in the clinical trial comes to light, leading to unanticipated consequences for both her and others. A plane crash puts pressure on the hospital. Cristina finds herself in a compromising situation, which forces her to decide between her career and her relationship. Meanwhile, Owen posts his decision for chief resident and Teddy makes a surprising choice regarding her love life -- and her future.

== Cast and characters ==
=== Main ===
- Ellen Pompeo as Dr. Meredith Grey
- Sandra Oh as Dr. Cristina Yang
- Justin Chambers as Dr. Alex Karev
- Chandra Wilson as Dr. Miranda Bailey
- James Pickens Jr. as Dr. Richard Webber
- Sara Ramirez as Dr. Callie Torres
- Eric Dane as Dr. Mark Sloan
- Chyler Leigh as Dr. Lexie Grey
- Kevin McKidd as Dr. Owen Hunt
- Jessica Capshaw as Dr. Arizona Robbins
- Kim Raver as Dr. Teddy Altman
- Sarah Drew as Dr. April Kepner
- Jesse Williams as Dr. Jackson Avery
- Patrick Dempsey as Dr. Derek Shepherd

=== Recurring ===
- James Tupper as Dr. Andrew Perkins
- Rachael Taylor as Dr. Lucy Fields
- Peter MacNicol as Dr. Robert Stark
- Scott Foley as Henry Burton
- Daniel Sunjata as Nurse Eli
- Loretta Devine as Adele Webber
- Jeff Perry as Thatcher Grey
- Nicole Cummins as Paramedic Nicole

=== Notable guests ===
- Kate Walsh as Dr. Addison Montgomery
- Caterina Scorsone as Dr. Amelia Shepherd
- Jason George as Dr. Ben Warren
- Mark Saul as Dr. Steve Mastow
- Mandy Moore as Mary Portman
- Ryan Devlin as Bill Portman
- Frances Conroy as Eleanor
- Diane Farr as Laila
- Héctor Elizondo as Carlos Torres
- Debra Mooney as Evelyn Hunt
- Amanda Foreman as Nora
- Amber Benson as Corinne Henley
- Jamie Chung as Trina
- Steven W. Bailey as Joe, the Bartender
- Adam Busch as Fred Wilson
- Marina Sirtis as Sonya
- Nancy Travis as Allison Baker
- L. Scott Caldwell as Alison
- Wilmer Calderon as Raul Aranda
- Toni Torres as Annette Aranda
- Anthony Keyvan as Miguel Aranda
- Amber Stevens as Laurel Pinson
- Candice Patton as Meg Waylon
- Doris Roberts as Gladys

== Reception ==
=== Ratings ===
==== Live + SD ratings ====
No. in series	No. in season	Episode	Air date	Time slot (EST)	Rating/Share (18–49)	Viewers (m)	18–49 Rank	Viewership rank
127	1	"With You I'm Born Again"	September 23, 2010	Thursdays; 9:00 p.m.	5.4/14	14.32	3	10
128	2	"Shock to the System"	September 30, 2010	Thursdays; 9:00 p.m.	4.6/12	12.53	8	17
129	3	"Superfreak"	October 7, 2010	Thursdays; 9:00 p.m.	4.6/13	12.75	4	11
130	4	"Can't Fight Biology"	October 14, 2010	Thursdays; 9:00 p.m.	4.6/12	12.11	5	16
131	5	"Almost Grown"	October 21, 2010	Thursdays; 9:00 p.m.	4.0/11	10.97	8	23
132	6	"These Arms of Mine"	October 28, 2010	Thursdays; 9:00 p.m.	3.9/10	10.79	15	—N/a
133	7	"That's Me Trying"	November 4, 2010	Thursdays; 9:00 p.m.	4.3/12	11.92	6	15
134	8	"Something's Gotta Give"	November 11, 2010	Thursdays; 9:00 p.m.	4.0/11	11.13	11	20
135	9	"Slow Night, So Long"	November 18, 2010	Thursdays; 9:00 p.m.	4.3/11	11.46	8	21
136	10	"Adrift and at Peace"	December 2, 2010	Thursdays; 9:00 p.m.	4.0/10	11.02	6	14
137	11	"Disarm"	January 6, 2011	Thursdays; 9:00 p.m.	4.2/11	11.64	11	16
138	12	"Start Me Up"	January 13, 2011	Thursdays; 9:00 p.m.	4.3/12	12.15	6	10
139	13	"Don't Deceive Me (Please Don't Go)"	February 3, 2011	Thursdays; 9:00 p.m.	4.3/11	11.18	8	14
140	14	"P.Y.T. (Pretty Young Thing)"	February 10, 2011	Thursdays; 9:00 p.m.	3.9/10	10.47	10	20
141	15	"Golden Hour"	February 17, 2011	Thursdays; 9:00 p.m.	3.7/10	10.24	7	23
142	16	"Not Responsible"	February 24, 2011	Thursdays; 9:00 p.m.	3.4/9	9.13	13	—N/a
143	17	"This Is How We Do It"	March 24, 2011	Thursdays; 9:00 p.m.	3.7/10	10.28	7	17
144	18	"Song Beneath the Song"	March 31, 2011	Thursdays; 9:00 p.m.	4.9/13	13.09	5	10
145	19	"It's a Long Way Back"	April 28, 2011	Thursdays; 9:00 p.m.	3.7/9	10.67	6	15
146	20	"White Wedding"	May 5, 2011	Thursdays; 9:00 p.m.	3.5/10	10.11	8	19
147	21	"I Will Survive"	May 12, 2011	Thursdays; 9:00 p.m.	3.2/9	9.63	14	25
148	22	"Unaccompanied Minor"	May 19, 2011	Thursdays; 9:00 p.m.	3.6/9	9.89	10	20

==== Live + 7 Day (DVR) ratings ====
No. in series	No. in season	Episode	Air date	Time slot (EST)	18–49 rating increase	Viewers (millions) increase	Total 18-49	Total viewers (millions)	Ref
127	1	"With You I'm Born Again"	September 23, 2010	Thursdays; 9:00 p.m.	1.4	2.95	6.8	17.32	
128	2	"Shock to the System"	September 30, 2010	Thursdays; 9:00 p.m.	1.5	3.08	6.1	15.64	
129	3	"Superfreak"	October 7, 2010	Thursdays; 9:00 p.m.	1.4	2.87	6.0	15.69	
130	4	"Can't Fight Biology"	October 14, 2010	Thursdays; 9:00 p.m.	1.5	2.94	6.1	15.10	
131	5	"Almost Grown"	October 21, 2010	Thursdays; 9:00 p.m.	1.5	3.02	5.5	14.02	
132	6	"These Arms of Mine"	October 28, 2010	Thursdays; 9:00 p.m.	1.4	3.03	5.3	13.83	
133	7	"That's Me Trying"	November 4, 2010	Thursdays; 9:00 p.m.	1.3	2.67	5.7	14.61	
134	8	"Something's Gotta Give"	November 11, 2010	Thursdays; 9:00 p.m.	1.5	3.02	5.5	14.16	
135	9	"Slow Night, So Long"	November 18, 2010	Thursdays; 9:00 p.m.	1.5	2.94	5.8	14.43	
136	10	"Adrift and at Peace"	December 2, 2010	Thursdays; 9:00 p.m.	1.4	2.79	5.3	13.82	
137	11	"Disarm"	January 6, 2011	Thursdays; 9:00 p.m.	1.3	2.85	5.5	14.51	
138	12	"Start Me Up"	January 13, 2011	Thursdays; 9:00 p.m.	1.5	2.81	5.8	14.96	
139	13	"Don't Deceive Me (Please Don't Go)"	February 3, 2011	Thursdays; 9:00 p.m.	1.4	2.86	5.7	14.06	
140	14	"P.Y.T. (Pretty Young Thing)"	February 10, 2011	Thursdays; 9:00 p.m.	1.4	2.88	5.3	13.36	
141	15	"Golden Hour"	February 17, 2011	Thursdays; 9:00 p.m.	1.5	2.85	5.2	13.09	
142	16	"Not Responsible"	February 24, 2011	Thursdays; 9:00 p.m.	1.4	2.87	4.8	12.02	
143	17	"This Is How We Do It"	March 24, 2011	Thursdays; 9:00 p.m.	1.5	2.96	5.2	13.26	
144	18	"Song Beneath the Song"	March 31, 2011	Thursdays; 9:00 p.m.	1.4	2.91	6.3	16.00	
145	19	"It's a Long Way Back"	April 28, 2011	Thursdays; 9:00 p.m.	1.4	2.92	5.1	13.58	
146	20	"White Wedding"	May 5, 2011	Thursdays; 9:00 p.m.	1.6	3.14	5.1	13.25	
147	21	"I Will Survive"	May 12, 2011	Thursdays; 9:00 p.m.	1.4	2.78	4.6	12.41	
148	22	"Unaccompanied Minor"	May 19, 2011	Thursdays; 9:00 p.m.	1.3	2.94	4.9	12.81	

=== Critical response ===
The reviews to the season were mixed-to-positive. Robert Bianco USA Today gave a largely positive review stating, "Happily, it now seems to have landed on solid ground, with its best ensemble and most engaging stories in years, the union of Meredith and Derek strengthened it by pushing them into a more mature place", and praising Sandra Oh's performance:" Cristina, who responded last week with a performance that stands with any you're likely to see."

The TV Addict also lauded the season and wrote, "the seventh season of ABC's genre-defining medical drama is good. Is it "great again"? This would imply that it was great before, a memory I wish I could fondly look back on, but can't. I'll admit to have been taken with the doctors of Seattle Grace in their initial seasons: they had chemistry, gave some nice performances", praising the majority cast including Oh's "powerful performance".

Jennifer Armstrong of Entertainment Weekly also praised the season, "Season 7 hasn't relegated the finale's events to a dramatic stunt; rather, it's reveled in the possibilities of rebuilding life in the wake of tragedy." She added "It's in the shooting's emotional reverberations that the show is regenerating after the past few hit-and-miss seasons."

Tom Gliatto writing for People Weekly called the season "satisfying", "Grey has been on long enough now that it has lost much of its erotic sizzle--McDreamy is edging toward McNappy--but the satisfyingly-steady seventh season is a model of a hit that keeps fitting new characters into the blueprint."

Renee Scolaro Rathke of PopMatters, reviewing the premiere, gave a mixed review, "Unfortunately, the best bits of the premiere were the flashbacks to the finale, though their impact was watered down considerably in the context of an action-less storyline, filled with Grey's usual rambling pontifications." Verne Gay of Newsday was rather critical of the season stating, "Unfortunately, they've settled on far-too-easy and facile answers for the most part."

The marriage of Callie Torres and Arizona Robbins in "White Wedding" was noted for its significance to LGBT representation on network television. The Advocate described Callie and Arizona as the first regular lesbian characters on a prime-time network series to be shown walking down the aisle.

== DVD release ==
Grey's Anatomy: The Complete Seventh Season - More Heartbeats
Set details		Special features
22 Episodes (1 extended); 6-Disc Set; English (Dolby Digital 5.1 Surround); Subtitles: English SDH, Spanish & French; Runtime: 952 minutes		Extended Episode: "Song Beneath the Song"; Dissecting Grey's Anatomy - Unaired Scenes; In Stitches: Season 7 Outtakes; The Music Event: Behind the Scenes; Seattle Grace: Message of Hope - 6 Webisodes; The Making of "Seattle Grace: Message of Hope"
Release dates
Region 1	Region 2	Region 4
September 13, 2011	May 28, 2012	November 2, 2011
