= Kerrigan =

Kerrigan may refer to:

- Kerrigan (surname)
- Kerrigan Mahan (born 1955), American voice actor
- Kerrigan, Missouri, U.S. ghost town

== See also ==
- karrigan (born 1990), Danish esports player
- Karigan, village in Gevar Rural District, Sarduiyeh District, Jiroft County, Kerman Province, Iran
