= Kerrigan (surname) =

Kerrigan is a surname of Irish origin. Anglicized from the Gaelic "Ó Ciaragán." From the word ciar, it means "black; dark."

== People ==
Notable people with the surname include:

- Dan Kerrigan (1843–1880), American pugilist, sportsman, and politician
- Danny Kerrigan (born 1982), English footballer
- Daryl Kerrigan, Irish-American fashion designer
- Don Kerrigan (1941–1990), Scottish football player
- Frank Kerrigan (1868–1935), United States District Judge
- Gene Kerrigan, Irish journalist and novelist
- Herbert Kerrigan (1879–1959), American track and field athlete
- James Kerrigan (1828–1899), United States Representative from New York
- J. M. Kerrigan (James Michael Kerrigan, 1884–1964), Irish actor
- Jimmy Kerrigan (born 1959), Irish Gaelic football player
- Joe Kerrigan (born 1954), American baseball player
- John Kerrigan (disambiguation), several people
- Jonathan Kerrigan (born 1972), English actor
- Justin Kerrigan (born 1974), Welsh writer and film director
- Kait Kerrigan, American playwright, musical theater lyricist and book writer
- Kathleen Kerrigan (actress) (c.1869–1957), American actress
- Kathleen Kerrigan (judge), American federal judge
- Lodge Kerrigan (born 1964), American motion picture screenwriter and director
- Marguerite Kerrigan (1931–2022), American professional baseball player
- Michael Kerrigan (1952–2014), British television director
- Mike Kerrigan (born 1960), American football player
- Nancy Kerrigan (born 1969), American figure skater
- Patrick J. Kerrigan (1864–1895), New York assemblyman
- Patrick Kerrigan (1928–1979), Irish politician
- Paul Kerrigan (born 1986), Irish Gaelic footballer
- Peter Kerrigan (1899–1977), British trade unionist
- Rose Kerrigan (1903–1995), British communist
- Ryan Kerrigan (born 1988), American football player
- Simon Kerrigan (born 1989), English cricketer
- Steve Kerrigan (born 1971), American politician
- Steve Kerrigan (footballer) (born 1972), Scottish football player
- T. S. Kerrigan (Thomas Sherman Kerrigan, born 1939), American lawyer and poet
- Tom Kerrigan (golfer) (1895–1964), American golfer
- Tom Kerrigan (American football) (1906–1979), American football player
- J. Warren Kerrigan (1879–1947), American silent film actor and film director

=== Fictional characters ===
- Sarah Kerrigan, fictional character in the StarCraft universe and Heroes of the Storm
- Ryan Kerrigan, fictional character fiancé of Amelia Shepherd in the Grey's Anatomy universe
