= Amelia Shepherd =

Fictional character

- Private Practice & Grey's Anatomy character
- Caterina Scorsone as Dr. Amelia Shepherd
- First appearance: Private Practice: "Eyes Wide Open" (3.19) April 1, 2010 (as recurring cast) "Take Two" (4.01) September 23, 2010 (as series regular); Grey's Anatomy: "Superfreak" (7.03); October 7, 2010 (as guest star) "I Must Have Lost it on the Wind (11.01); September 25, 2014 (as series regular); Station 19: "Born to Run" (03.08); March 12, 2020 (as guest star)
- Created by: Shonda Rhimes
- Portrayed by: Caterina Scorsone

In-universe information
- Full name: Amelia Frances Shepherd
- Nicknames: Amy; Hurricane Amelia; The Other Shepherd; Girl Shepherd; The Junkie; The Wrong Dr. Shepherd; Auntie Amelia; Shepherdess
- Title(s): Chief of Neurosurgery; M.D. F.A.C.S.
- Occupation: Head of Neurosurgery at Grey Sloan Memorial Hospital; Neurosurgeon at Oceanside wellness group (former); Neurosurgeon at St. Ambrose Hospital (former)
- Family: Christopher Shepherd (father; deceased); Carolyn Shepherd (née Maloney (mother); Derek Shepherd (brother, deceased); Nancy Shepherd (sister); Kathleen Shepherd (sister); Liz Shepherd (sister)
- Spouse: Owen Hunt (m. 2016; div. 2018)
- Significant others: Toni Wright (girlfriend); Kai Bartley (ex-partner); Atticus Lincoln (ex-boyfriend); James Peterson (ex-fiancé); Ryan Kerrigan (fiancé; deceased)
- Children: Christopher Shepherd (deceased); Scout Derek Shepherd Lincoln
- Relatives: Adam (uncle; deceased); Zola Grey Shepherd (niece); Derek Bailey Shepherd (nephew); Meredith Grey (Sister-In-Law); Addison Montgomery (Former Sister-In-Law); Ellis Shepherd (niece); Lucas Adams (nephew); Eleven assorted nieces and nephews
- Nationality: American
- Born: 1980

Amelia Frances Shepherd, M.D., F.A.C.S. is a fictional character from the ABC American television medical drama Grey's Anatomy and the series Private Practice, portrayed by Caterina Scorsone. Amelia was introduced in Season 3 of Private Practice, visiting her former sister-in-law, Addison Montgomery, and later became a partner at the Oceanside Wellness Group. In July 2010, it was announced that Scorsone was promoted to a series regular for season 4 of Private Practice after her guest appearance in the final five episodes of season 3. She remained on the show until its final episode in 2013.

Amelia's crossover to Grey's Anatomy began as a special guest in one episode of both the seventh (2010–11) and eighth (2011–12) seasons, which ran concurrently with the fourth (2010–11) and fifth (2011–12) seasons of Private Practice. After Private Practice ended its six-season run in January 2013, Scorsone returned to Grey's Anatomy, making recurring appearances in the final four episodes of Season 10 (2014). Following this, she was promoted to a series regular in Season 11 (2014–15) and has continued to be a central character through all subsequent seasons, including Season 23, which began airing in October 2026.

Amelia is the youngest sibling in the Shepherd family, and the character is marked by her struggles with addiction, ambition, and emotional trauma. She is a recovering drug addict whose storylines across both Grey's Anatomy and Private Practice revolve around her battle for sobriety, recklessness, and her career as a talented yet troubled neurosurgeon. Over the course of her arc, Amelia faces numerous personal and professional challenges, all while trying to establish herself beyond the shadow of her late brother, Derek Shepherd (Patrick Dempsey). Scorsone's performance as Amelia has been praised by both critics and fans for portraying complex emotional depth and resilience.

Scorsone herself has described Amelia's "hero" journey as showing the "full phoenix-ing of a woman who was so broken and traumatized by loss and addiction", emphasizing the character's growth and redemption from her darker past. Amelia has also appeared as a guest star on the second Grey's Anatomy spin-off, Station 19, further establishing her presence in the Grey's Anatomy universe.

== Development ==
=== Casting and creation ===
On March 2, 2010, Caterina Scorsone was recruited to join the cast of Shonda Rhimes' medical drama series Private Practice in the recurring role of Amelia Shepherd, the younger sister of Derek Shepherd from the parent show, Grey's Anatomy. Eric Stoltz, who directed Scorsone's debut episode, "Eyes Wide Open", recommended her for the role after recalling her talent from their previous work together in My Horrible Year! (2001). Stoltz pointed out Scorsone's acting skills and her resemblance to Patrick Dempsey, who portrays Derek Shepherd, which caught Rhimes' attention. Despite the recommendation, Scorsone still had to go through the regular audition process to secure the role. She ended up appearing in five episodes of Private Practice's third season.

As of July 2010, Scorsone was promoted to a series regular for Private Practice, following the strong reception of her character.

Scorsone has shared that her sister was a big fan of Grey's Anatomy, and she herself was inspired by the show in an unexpected way. While finishing her bachelor's degree, Scorsone binge-watched the first season of Grey's Anatomy to unwind after exams. She recalled, "I was under the misapprehension that I wanted to become a doctor. So I went to this medical faculty lecture series and by the end, I said, ‘I don't want to be a doctor. In fact, I just want to be on Grey's Anatomy.'" This passion for the show eventually came full circle when she became part of the Grey's Anatomy universe.

=== Characterization and development ===
That's what's so tragic about this episode: She went through more on Private Practice than any human could reasonably endure. She suffered so much tragedy, heartbreak and really has taken the long and hard path back to sobriety and back to a balanced life. Now she's come to Seattle under these circumstances to be of service, and she's finally proving herself as the chief of neuro and then her tragedies come back to blindside her.

— Scorsone on her character's past as a drug addict being exposed.

In an interview with The Hollywood Reporter, Scorsone discussed Amelia's past as a recovering addict, which is revealed in Grey's Anatomy's Season 11 episode, "Could We Start Again, Please?". She elaborated on the emotional depth of the storyline, saying, "There's the shock and sadness of seeing that all of the work that she's done to build this new life in Seattle is being destroyed, as everybody is finding out about her past in a way that she's not in control of. It's not as though she decided that she's comfortable with revealing her history and was able to tell the story sensitively; it was taken from her and exposed in a way that she wasn't in control of and that she wouldn't have chosen. It's a pretty exposing and disempowering experience for her."

Scorsone also highlighted the intensity required to portray Amelia, saying the character demands "lots of emotional energy to play" and explaining how she manages to distance herself from the role after filming: "To kind of shake it out and get back to my real personality, it helps to kind of go away and explore new things and see the world a little bit."

In reflecting on Amelia's journey during the fifth season of Private Practice, Scorsone commented in 2011 about her character's struggles: "Yes, at this point she suffers emotionally and chemically. She had her surgical privileges revoked because she fell off the wagon. So I explore depression, grief, and substance abuse. I think—speaking of wanting to help people—I do get to articulate and illustrate for people what a struggle with substance abuse and mental health looks like."

"Gosh. Everything we did in season 5 of Private Practice felt so intense and fresh. I do think we really dug into the addiction story in a way that educated so many people and made it clear that addiction is an illness and not a moral failing. The whole journey Amelia got to play that year was so rich and deep."

At this point, Amelia has grown so much. She has maintained her sobriety, become Chief of Neurosurgery, been an incredible friend to everyone she knows and helped to raise both a baby and a teenager who was struggling with addiction. Her love has expanded in so many ways, and she has her feet solidly planted on the ground.

— Scorsone on her character's development in the series.

The loss of Amelia's newborn son, Christopher, during Private Practice profoundly affects her storyline in Grey's Anatomy. In Season 13 (2016–17), Amelia faces a significant rift with her newly wedded husband, Owen Hunt (Kevin McKidd), over the prospect of having children. Scorsone explained the complexity of Amelia's fears regarding parenthood, which stem from the trauma of losing her firstborn. She stated, "...he's been very accepting but this is a very core trauma for Amelia and there's something about trauma that goes beyond logic. When someone has undergone serious trauma... there's something like trauma itself that makes whatever it was that traumatized the person almost unsayable. I think that's what she's experiencing: even to speak it is to re-traumatize herself in some ways." Amelia's deep fear of re-experiencing the loss paralyzes her, causing tension between her and Owen. She continued, "She loves him so much and she is also totally paralyzed by the fear and trauma she went through in Los Angeles."

Though Owen and Amelia ultimately break up due to their differences regarding having children, the two form a bond through co-parenting Betty and her son Leo, whom Owen later adopts. In Season 16 (2019–20), Amelia finds out she is pregnant again, this time with Link's child. Scorsone felt that Amelia was now more prepared for motherhood, having co-parented Leo and supported Betty, as well as processing the loss of Christopher aloud for the first time. The season presents Amelia in a much healthier and happier place, where she has grown into her "authentic self", with her career, community, and support of sisters Meredith and Maggie Pierce (Kelly McCreary). Scorsone elaborated, saying, "She doesn't want or need to lose herself in anything or anyone anymore," emphasizing that Amelia's sense of identity and motherhood is not contingent on her relationship with Atticus "Link" Lincoln (Chris Carmack). While Scorsone expressed uncertainty about whether Amelia's feelings for Link were entirely genuine or influenced by pregnancy hormones, she noted that Amelia admired Link's commitment to being a father, regardless of their romantic relationship.

== Private Practice storyline ==
Amelia's backstory, particularly the trauma of witnessing her father's murder at the age of 5, is a central aspect of her character development, as she explains in season 3, episode 22, "In the Name of Love", of the show.

Amelia first appears in Private Practice during the Season 3 episode 19, "Eyes Wide Open", as part of a team of neurosurgeons visiting Los Angeles for a consult. Despite knowing she would run into her former sister-in-law, Addison Montgomery (Kate Walsh), Amelia joins the team. However, she is soon fired after offering a patient's family hope by suggesting an experimental surgery, which her boss, Dr. Geraldine Ginsberg (Nora Dunn), and her brother, Derek Shepherd (Patrick Dempsey), disagree with. The patient's husband insists that Amelia perform the surgery, despite its risks, leading to tension and conflict over her decision to defy her superiors.

Seeking stability, Amelia requests a position at Oceanside Wellness as the primary neurosurgeon. In the Season 3 finale, Amelia performs surgery on Maya Bennett, Sam and Naomi's pregnant daughter. Immediately after the surgery, she rushes to treat Dell Parker (Chris Lowell), a beloved colleague who has suffered brain bleeds, but he dies on the operating table. Amelia is devastated by Dell's death, and the emotional weight of her job starts to take its toll.

Shortly after, a friend from college visits Amelia, whose mother had died from Huntington's disease. Amelia encourages her friend to get tested for the gene, and when the results come back positive, her friend pleads with her to assist in suicide, unwilling to face the same fate as her mother. Amelia refuses to help, and her friend eventually takes her own life, adding to Amelia's mounting grief.

Amelia's emotional pain leads her to relapse on drugs. During her struggle with addiction, she meets a man named Ryan, and the two fall in love, bonding over their shared addiction. Ryan proposes to Amelia, and she gifts him her father's watch, a deeply meaningful item tied to her father's murder. The watch symbolizes the love between her parents, and her decision to give it to Ryan shows how much he meant to her. Together, they decide to quit drugs and start a family, but they decide to have "one last high" before quitting, which results in Ryan overdosing and dying. Amelia wakes up next to Ryan's body, a devastating blow that pushes her deeper into grief.

Shortly after Ryan's death, Amelia discovers she is pregnant with his child. However, during her pregnancy, she learns that the baby, Christopher, has no frontal lobe and will not survive after birth. Amelia carries the pregnancy to term and holds Christopher in her arms as he passes away shortly after birth. In a final act of love and to give meaning to Christopher's short life, Amelia donates all of his organs, ensuring that his death was not in vain.

== Grey's Anatomy storyline ==
=== Guest appearances ===
After the conclusion of Private Practice in January 2013, Amelia was officially integrated into Grey's Anatomy as a regular character. In Grey's Anatomy's Season 10, Amelia appeared in the final four episodes, visiting her brother Derek Shepherd and his wife Meredith Grey in Seattle. She assisted them in caring for their children and became more involved in the storyline. Prior to this, Amelia had only made brief guest appearances on Grey's Anatomy during cross-over events between the two shows, such as in seasons 7 and 8.

In the third episode of season 7 of Grey's Anatomy, Amelia and Derek began to reconcile their strained relationship after years of emotional distance. Later, in the fifteenth episode of season 8, she worked alongside Lexie Grey (Chyler Leigh) on a neuro case involving a patient with a brain tumor. This episode reignited her dispute with Derek over surgical methods, highlighting their different approaches to medicine and their ongoing sibling tension.

=== As regular cast member ===
On June 23, 2014, Scorsone and her character, Amelia, were promoted to the regular cast of Grey's Anatomy for season eleven, which premiered in September 2014.

In Season 11, Amelia ended her engagement with James and began a secret romantic relationship with Owen Hunt (Kevin McKidd). She later confided in her brother Derek about the relationship. However, Derek's death deeply affected Amelia, and she grieved his loss alongside Owen. After Derek's passing, Owen temporarily left for the army but returned later in the season, leading to a deeper connection between them as they bonded over their grief.

In Season 12, Amelia and Owen's romance grew, but Amelia also struggled with anger towards Meredith Grey for unplugging Derek from life support without giving her a chance to say goodbye. Additionally, she harbored resentment towards Miranda Bailey (Chandra Wilson) for hiring Penny Blake (Samantha Sloyan), one of the doctors involved in Derek's care on the day he died. Despite these conflicts, Amelia and Owen got married by the end of the season, though she had doubts and second thoughts leading up to the wedding.

Season 13 presented challenges for Amelia and Owen's marriage, especially regarding the topic of having children. Amelia's trauma from losing her firstborn son, Christopher, resurfaced, leading to marital strain. In Season 14, their relationship further deteriorated, and after Amelia had a brain tumor removed, they amicably divorced, attributing some of her erratic behavior to the tumor. Later in the season, Amelia became involved in helping a teenage addict named Betty, who had a six-month-old son, Leo. Owen eventually adopted Leo, while Betty returned to her parents for stability. Though Owen and Amelia rekindled their romantic relationship, it became complicated when Owen discovered his former love, Teddy Altman (Kim Raver), was pregnant with his child.

In Season 15, Amelia began a relationship with Atticus "Link" Lincoln (Chris Carmack) and soon discovered she was pregnant. Initially uncertain about the baby's paternity, as it could have been Owen's, she found reassurance in Link's unconditional love and support, regardless of whether he was the father. Amelia gave birth to their son in the Season 16 finale, and they later named him Scout Derek Shepherd Lincoln in the Season 17 premiere. However, towards the end of Season 17, Link proposed to Amelia, but she turned him down, causing a rift in their relationship.

In Season 18, Amelia became involved in a storyline with Meredith Grey (Ellen Pompeo) focused on Parkinson's disease research. They traveled to Minnesota to collaborate on finding a cure for the disease, funded by Dr. David Hamilton (Peter Gallagher), who has Parkinson's. During this time, Amelia met Dr. Kai Bartley (E. R. Fightmaster), a non-binary neuroscientist and Hopkins alumni. In the mid-season finale, Kai traveled to Seattle with Dr. Hamilton for his surgery, and Amelia and Kai's connection deepened, culminating in them sharing a kiss outside Grey Sloan Memorial Hospital. They broke up in Season 19 and Kai moved to London.

In Season 20, Amelia begins to form a connection with Dr. Monica Beltran (Natalie Morales), a pediatric surgeon from Texas who joins Grey Sloan Memorial after being recruited by Richard Webber (James Pickens Jr.). Their dynamic starts off rocky when Amelia takes Monica’s parking spot on her first day. Amelia eventually asks Monica out, but Monica declines due to her ongoing divorce. In Season 21, Amelia learns that Monica had a one-night stand with Dr. Winston Ndugu (Anthony Hill), however the two of them remain friends. Additionally, Amelia takes on an impossible surgery on 9-year-old, Dylan Gatlin. In the Season 21 finale, Monica witnesses Amelia being held hostage in OR2 by Dylan’s mother, Jenna Gatlin (Piper Perabo) and alerts for help. After an explosion in OR2, Monica dies later that evening, right next to Dr. Jules Millin (Adelaide Kane) in the Season 22 premiere. In the wake of the explosion, Amelia takes a sabbatical following the irreversible outcome of Dylan’s surgery and Monica’s death.

As of Season 23, Amelia begins a relationship with Dr. Toni Wright (Jen Landon), a fellow physician and plastic surgeon whom she met on orientation day at Harvard Medical School.

== Reception ==
Tanner Stransky from Entertainment Weekly felt that Scorsone's appearance in the Grey's Anatomy Season 8 crossover episode, "Have You Seen Me Lately?", was one of the weaker crossover episodes for the parent show. However, he praised the "dramatic" nature of its Private Practice portion. Stransky evaluated that "for characters I don't really care about that much, I did care... a little bit." He also noted that Amelia "proved her strength", despite the many "demons in her life", which added depth to her character arc.
