= Teddy Altman =

Fictional character

- Grey's Anatomy character
- Kim Raver as Dr. Teddy Altman in 2010.
- First appearance: "New History" (6.09); November 12, 2009
- Last appearance: "Bridge over Troubled Water" (22.18); May 7, 2026 (as series regular)
- Created by: Shonda Rhimes
- Portrayed by: Kim Raver
- Season(s): 6–8 (main); 14 (recurring); 15–22 (main)

In-universe information
- Full name: Theodora Grace Altman
- Title(s): M.D. F.A.C.S. Major, US army (inactive)
- Occupation: Chief of Surgery; Attending Cardiothoracic Surgeon; Co-Head of Cardiothoracic Surgery (Former); Head of Cardiothoracic Surgery (Former); Head of Trauma Surgery (Former)
- Spouses: Henry Burton (m. 2011, died 2012); Owen Hunt (m. 2021, div. 2026; reconciled)
- Significant others: Andrew Perkins (ex-boyfriend); Mark Sloan (ex-lover; deceased); Tom Koracick (ex-boyfriend); Allison Robin Brown (ex-girlfriend; deceased)
- Children: Leo Hunt (raising with Owen); Allison Hunt
- Status: Alive
- Born: 1976
- Alma mater: University of Texas Southwestern (MD)

Theodora Grace "Teddy" Altman, M.D., F.A.C.S. is a fictional character from the ABC medical drama Grey's Anatomy. The character was created by series producer Shonda Rhimes, and is portrayed by Kim Raver. She was introduced as a recurring character in Season 6, but is later upgraded to series-regular in the same season after Katherine Heigl's departure from the series.

Altman was conceived as the third major cardiothoracic surgeon attending on the series, following the exits of Preston Burke (Isaiah Washington) and Erica Hahn (Brooke Smith). In the storyline, Altman is brought in as a mentor for Cristina Yang (Sandra Oh) at the suggestion of Owen Hunt (Kevin McKidd), who had served with Altman in the military. This mentorship develops complications when a past connection between Owen and Teddy creates a love-triangle involving Yang.

Another notable storyline includes Altman's relationship with Henry Burton (Scott Foley), a patient she marries to provide healthcare coverage, only to eventually fall in love with him. Raver's initial stint on the show lasted from 2009 to 2012, ending with her departure in the Season 8 finale.

Altman reappears in Season 14 after a five-year absence when it is revealed that she helped identify Megan Hunt (Abigail Spencer), Owen's presumed-dead sister, who is found alive. In Season 15, Altman is upgraded once again to a series regular after it is revealed she is pregnant with Owen's child. Since her return, her storylines have focused on her involvement in multiple love triangles, including with Owen, Amelia Shepherd (Caterina Scorsone), and Tom Koracick (Greg Germann).

Altman's backstory also reveals she had a romantic relationship with Allison, her best friend who died during the 9/11 attacks. This revelation confirmed Altman's bisexuality, a significant development in her character's arc. Eventually, Altman ascends to the role of Chief of Surgery, succeeding Meredith Grey (Ellen Pompeo) in the position.

== Storylines ==
Teddy attended the University of Texas Southwestern Medical Center. She completed her surgical residency at George Washington University Medical School and her fellowship at Mayo Clinic, Florida. As an attending physician, Teddy worked at Columbia University, but after her best friend and lover Allison (Sherri Saum) was killed during the collapse of the second tower on September 11, 2001, she left and joined the army, meeting trauma surgeon Owen Hunt (Kevin McKidd) during her tour in Baghdad.

Owen brings Teddy to Seattle Grace Mercy West hospital to mentor his girlfriend, Cristina Yang (Sandra Oh). Teddy admits that she is in love with Owen, but he tells her that he loves Cristina. When Teddy assigns Cristina a difficult surgery for her first solo cardiothoracic case and refuses to assist, Owen questions Teddy's motives. Teddy decides to leave Seattle Grace; Cristina pleads with her to stay, even offering to break up with Owen if Teddy will continue to teach her. Although Teddy agrees to stay, Owen convinces Cristina to stay with him, and Teddy briefly removes her from her service.

Teddy develops a friendship with pediatric surgeon Arizona Robbins (Jessica Capshaw), who sets her up with plastic surgeon Mark Sloan (Eric Dane). They have a brief relationship, which they both enjoy despite knowing that neither wants the other—Teddy still wants Owen, and Mark is in love with Lexie Grey (Chyler Leigh). The two separate amicably when Teddy walks in on Mark sleeping with resident Reed Adamson (Nora Zehetner).

Towards the end of Season 6, Teddy has to fight for her job as Chief of Cardiothoracic Surgery. Cristina asks Owen to put in a good word for Teddy; he does the opposite by telling Chief of Surgery Derek Shepherd (Patrick Dempsey) that she would land on her feet. Ultimately another candidate refuses to take the post and Teddy receives a full-time contract. Teddy later learns of, and is hurt by Owen's betrayal.

Teddy has a brief relationship with Andrew Perkins (James Tupper), whose service at the hospital is temporary. Before his departure, he suggests that Teddy has a tendency to fall for people who are either otherwise engaged or only in town for a month. She later meets Henry Burton (Scott Foley), a patient with the rare genetic condition Von Hippel–Lindau disease, who can no longer afford to pay for his medical care. Teddy marries him so that he can use her health insurance, and only comes to appreciate the gravity of this decision when Henry suffers a near fatal complication of his illness. Teddy discovers that he has listed her as his emergency contact and is forced to make a life-or-death decision regarding his care, not as his doctor but as his wife. Though the newly-weds both maintain that theirs is a simple marriage of convenience, and Teddy continues to date other men, Henry later confesses that he has feelings for Teddy. She tells him she does not feel the same way.

Teddy again removes Cristina from her service when she performs a surgery despite Teddy's opposition. She tells Owen that Cristina's over-abundance of confidence makes her dangerous, and that she will keep Cristina off her service until she feels she is ready to return. When Andrew returns and asks Teddy to move to Germany with him, she accepts, and agrees to divorce Henry. However, in the Season 7 finale, Teddy changes her mind and tells Henry that she is falling in love with him. The two begin their married life properly, but in Season 8, Henry dies, leaving Teddy distraught. She blames Owen because she wasn't told that Henry had died until after her surgery on another patient. Feeling that he put the hospital before her, she breaks off her friendship with him, causing problems with them being able to work together that are later made worse by Cristina's own relationship troubles with Owen (During this time, Cristina tells Owen that he has to grant Teddy her anger, to which an enraged Owen lashes out the hypocrisy in the situation, given that when Cristina discovered she was pregnant with Owen's child, she told him that keeping the pregnancy was non negotiable and wanted to pursue an abortion, despite Owen's desire to have a child, and his pleas to keep the pregnancy, points out that Cristina never "granted him any anger" over what he thought was her selfish decision). After a particularly bad case, Miranda Bailey (Chandra Wilson) sternly tells Teddy that what happened with Henry was not Owen's fault and that Teddy knows this and needs to get over it, which pushes Teddy to behave more civilly towards Owen, but she finally lets go of her anger after she desperately begs Owen to convince Cristina (who by this point has broken up with him) to not transfer away from Seattle and is left shocked and silent when Owen furiously tells her he will not do that because he and Teddy are only co-workers and, as she made very clear, not friends and therefore she has no right to ask him for any help or favors. She and Owen eventually make up in the season finale. Owen finds out she was offered a job at the United States Army Medical Command, but turned it down because she wanted to be there for Owen, if he and Cristina were to separate. He ultimately fires her and she does take the military job, and tells her that he'll be okay as they part having restored their friendship. Teddy and Owen make up and hug each other goodbye as he wants her to take the job offer, which would be good for her.

Teddy is later mentioned in Season 13 episode, "True Colors", when army officers speak to Amelia Shepherd (Caterina Scorsone) about the return of Owen's missing sister, Megan (Abigail Spencer), whom Teddy knew while serving.

In Season 14, following the split between Amelia and Owen, in which Amelia tells Owen to profess his love for Teddy, Owen travels to Germany to be with her. In Germany, Teddy and Owen sleep together, but after the two fight over their history, Teddy sends Owen on his way. In the season finale, Teddy returns to Grey Sloan, and it is revealed that she is pregnant with Owen's baby.

In Season 15, Teddy, now heavily pregnant with Owen's baby, gets involved with Tom Koracick (Greg Germann), an attending neurosurgeon at Grey Sloan. Teddy and Tom's relationship quickly progresses, much to Owen's dismay, with Tom offering to help Teddy with the baby once she gives birth. However, though Teddy recognizes how right Tom is for her, she realizes that she is still in love with Owen. In the Season 15 finale, Teddy gives birth to her and Owen's daughter, whom they both have named Allison, in honor of Teddy's best-friend Allison Brown, who died during 9/11. Having broken up with Tom, Teddy admits her feelings to Owen, who reciprocates.

In Season 16, as Teddy and Owen plan to get married, Teddy struggles with being a new mother, and because she misses working, Owen offers to take time off as well. When Teddy learns that Owen might be the father of Amelia's baby, she runs back to Tom, and they begin to have an affair. It is later revealed that Owen is not the father, but Teddy and Tom still continue to sneak behind Owen's back. Towards the end of the season, Teddy travels to Los Angeles with a couple other surgeons from Grey Sloan for a medical conference, and she reminisces on her relationship with Allison, who was also her secret lover. At the end of the season, Teddy and Owen prepare for their wedding, but on the day of, Teddy accidentally sends Owen a voicemail of her and Tom having sex, and Owen postpones the wedding.

In Season 17, Owen breaks off his engagement from Teddy and is unable to forgive her for cheating. Teddy is put on Meredith's (Ellen Pompeo) COVID-19 case, and Meredith's worsening health drains Teddy physically and mentally. As Teddy continues to overwork herself, she finds herself ostracized at the hospital, as everyone has heard about her infidelity. Teddy reaches her breaking point when she is unable to save Andrew DeLuca (Giacomo Gianniotti), who dies from a stabbing wound from a child predator. This causes Teddy to go into a catatonic state, where she experiences nightmares and "what-ifs" about her past relationships. She is eventually able to start getting better, and at the same time, Owen offers her his friendship. Towards the end of the season, Owen and Teddy begin sleeping with each other again, and in the season finale, Owen proposes to Teddy, which she accepts.

In the beginning of Season 18, Teddy and Owen got married at the Emerald City Bar after their wedding at the Park was interrupted by a bicycle accident. After Owen's near-fatal car crash, she assists him with giving illegal drugs to dying soldiers. At the end of the season, she and Owen are reported for their actions and are seen taking a plane, now on the run. In Station 19's fifth season, she guest stars to aid show lead Andy Herrera's (Jaina Lee Ortiz) assaulter.

== Development ==
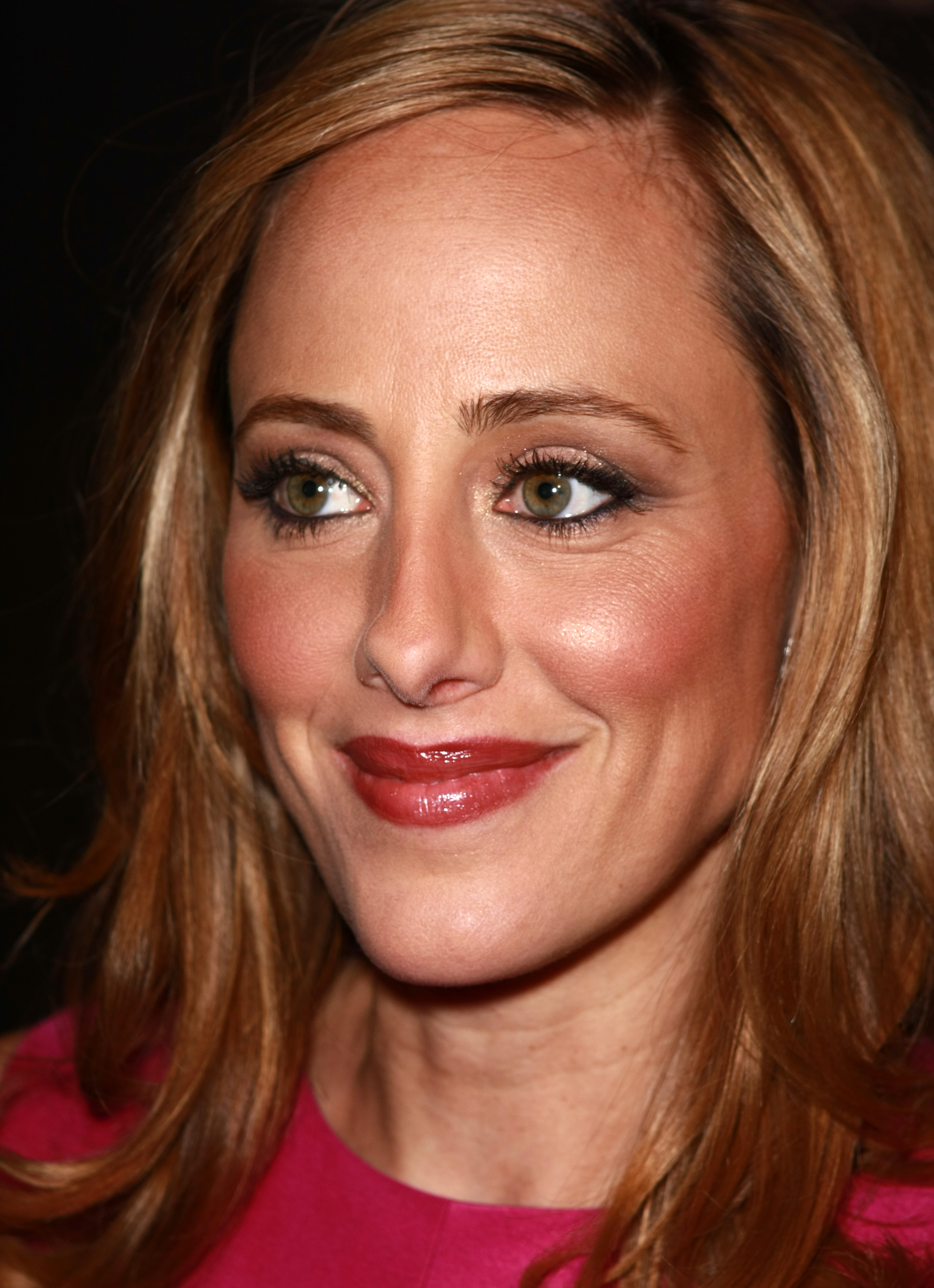
Kim Raver initially signed for a recurring role, but was promoted to a series-regular.

=== Casting and creation ===
In October 2009, it was reported that actress Kim Raver would join Grey's Anatomy as Teddy Altman, initially in a recurring role for the show's sixth season. By January 2010, Raver was promoted to a series regular.

On May 18, 2012, a day after the Season 8 finale, Grey's Anatomy creator Shonda Rhimes announced that it was Raver's decision to depart the series. Rhimes said, "I know this season's finale had some surprises for viewers and the exit of Kim Raver was one of the big ones. But Kim's series option was up and she was ready to give Teddy Altman a much-needed vacation. It's been a pleasure working with someone as talented and funny and kind as Kim; everyone is going to miss her terribly. I like to imagine that Teddy is still out there in the Grey's Anatomy universe, running Army Medical Command and building a new life."

When news of her departure was made public, Raver took to Twitter, expressing her gratitude: "I've had one of the best times of my creative career working on Grey's with Shonda, Betsy, and the best cast on television," adding: "I feel fortunate and grateful to have worked with such an amazing team at GA [Grey's Anatomy]. [I] am going to miss everyone!! And to the GA fans, you guys rock! I am sure S9 [Season 9] will be great!"

On June 20, 2017, it was announced that Raver would reprise her role as Teddy Altman in a guest arc for the show's 14th season. After recurring in Season 14, Raver was once again promoted to a series regular in Season 15.

== Reception ==
Entertainment Weekly writer Tanner Stransky remarked that Teddy Altman had not been given a substantial storyline until the arrival of Henry Burton, stating: "I think Kim Raver has always been rather under-used on this show, until more recently."
