= Grey's Anatomy season 22 =

Season of television series

Grey's Anatomy
- Season 22
- Promotional poster
- Showrunner: Meg Marinis
- Starring: Ellen Pompeo; Chandra Wilson; James Pickens Jr.; Kevin McKidd; Caterina Scorsone; Camilla Luddington; Jason George; Kim Raver; Chris Carmack; Anthony Hill; Alexis Floyd; Harry Shum Jr.; Adelaide Kane; Niko Terho; Trevor Jackson
- No. of episodes: 18

Release
- Original network: ABC
- Original release: October 9, 2025 – May 7, 2026

Season chronology
- ← Previous; Season 21 Next → Season 23

The twenty-second season of the American medical drama television series Grey's Anatomy was announced on April 3, 2025, and premiered in the United States on the American Broadcasting Company (ABC) on October 9, 2025.

This is the first season not to feature Jake Borelli and Midori Francis as series regulars since the sixteenth and nineteenth seasons, respectively.

On March 25, 2026, it was announced that series regulars Kevin McKidd (Dr. Owen Hunt) and Kim Raver (Dr. Teddy Altman) would depart the series after the season finale.

== Episodes ==
No. overall	No. in season	Title	Directed by	Written by	Original release date	U.S. viewers (millions)
449	1	"Only the Strong Survive"	Debbie Allen	Meg Marinis	October 9, 2025	2.61
After the catastrophic hospital explosion, Grey Sloan's staff scrambles to save not only their patients' lives but also their own. Confronted with impossible surgical decisions and emotional turmoil, they fight to preserve life amid devastation.
450	2	"We Built This City"	Kevin McKidd	Zoanne Clack	October 16, 2025	2.22
The team at Grey Sloan navigates a chaotic first day of surgical rotations amid hospital renovations. Ben accepts the position of chief resident and Meredith and Maggie spend time with Amelia.
451	3	"Between Two Lungs"	Debbie Allen	Sandra Hamada	October 23, 2025	2.16
A high-risk lung transplant pushes the surgical team to their limits. Meanwhile, Bailey juggles a trauma patient whose treatment hangs in the balance.
452	4	"Goodbye Horses"	Sammi Cannold	Jase Miles-Perez	October 30, 2025	2.13
The interns juggle a bizarre trauma, while a complex breast reconstruction forces Meredith into a tense partnership.
453	5	"Sometimes I Feel Like a Motherless Child"	Bille Woodruff	Jess Righthand	November 6, 2025	2.04
Jo navigates a challenging case with a pregnant mother, while Blue and Jules care for a diabetic patient. Meanwhile, Simone treats a patient with a surprising revelation.
454	6	"When I Crash"	Phylicia Rashad	Michelle Lirtzman	November 13, 2025	1.84
Grey Sloan takes in patients following a catastrophic bus accident. Teddy and Owen have an awkward encounter, and Richard tests Bailey’s patience.
455	7	"Skyfall"	Allison Liddi-Brown	Carol Brown	January 8, 2026	2.04
Winston performs an emergency C-section on Jo, delivering twin girls, but Jo’s cardiomyopathy worsens and she is left in a coma after a cardiac pump is placed. Both newborns are admitted to the NICU; one stabilizes quickly, while the other is treated for a heart murmur. As Link struggles to cope, colleagues rally to support the family. Jo later regains consciousness, and her baby’s condition improves. Elsewhere, Jules Millin confronts her feelings for Winston after treating a critically injured patient but finds him flirting in the bar, while Simone Griffith abandons their celibacy pact and reconnects with Wes. Bailey urges Richard Webber to follow up on his cancer diagnosis, and Lucas Adams grows closer to a terminally ill patient.
456	8	"Heavy On Me"	Lisa Leone	Tameson Duffy	January 15, 2026	2.23
Richard Webber decides to proceed with surgical treatment for his prostate cancer after consulting an outside specialist and reconsidering a watch-and-wait approach. Bailey and Owen lead a multidisciplinary team in the successful removal of a 35-pound abdominal tumor using ECMO support, and Owen proposes expanded trauma training opportunities for residents. Jules Millin reflects on her social detachment and begins engaging more openly with others. Jo Wilson continues recovering from postpartum complications while spending time with her newborn twins in the NICU and identifies eclampsia in another patient, directing emergency treatment that stabilizes the patient.
457	9	"Fortunate Son"	Kim Raver	Julie Wong	January 22, 2026	2.45
Richard continues to navigate his health. Meanwhile, Meredith and Nick are visited by Nick’s estranged sister from Boston.
458	10	"Strip That Down"	Kevin McKidd	Min-Woo Park	January 29, 2026	2.44
Addison Montgomery returns to Grey Sloan, seeking assistance with a patient with a neurological condition. Bailey joins Owen and Blue on a paramedic ride-along.
459	11	"(If You Want It) Do It Yourself"	Linda Klein	Scott D. Brown	February 26, 2026	2.25
Teddy and Winston clash over a case, while Owen and Jules treat a urologist. Lucas struggles with prioritizing patients. This episode is dedicated to the memory of Eric Dane, (who portrayed Dr. Mark Sloan), who died of amyotrophic lateral sclerosis (ALS) on February 19, 2026.
460	12	"Get Lucky"	Chandra Wilson	Jess Righthand	March 5, 2026	2.15
Tensions rise as Teddy and Winston take on a complex procedure, while Kavita and Ben try and impress the new plastics attending. Jo and Link leave the babies with a nanny for the first time.
461	13	"Love the Way You Lie"	Allison Liddi-Brown	Sophia Arnao	March 12, 2026	2.22
Richard tackles a shocking case on his first day back, while Kavita and Jules prepare for a high-stakes presentation. Bailey must have a difficult conversation with a beloved patient, and Jo works to baby-proof the loft.
462	14	"Wrecking Ball"	Kevin McKidd	Michelle Lirtzman	March 19, 2026	2.37
A couple lands in the hospital with life-altering injuries after a wrecking ball destroys their home. Lucas and Simone struggle to support a young, terminally ill patient, and Richard hosts a prostate screening event.
463	15	"Take Me to the River"	Bille Woodruff	Jase Miles-Perez	March 26, 2026	2.65
Bailey and Blue are forced to confront the emotional costs of experimental care. Meanwhile, Owen, Teddy, Simone and Dani help out at a busy rural hospital, and Richard attempts to spread information about early prostate screenings to the community.
464	16	"Feel It Still"	Jake Borelli	Sandra Hamada	April 2, 2026	2.38
Jo returns for her first full day back from leave, and Owen struggles to keep it together when someone close to him is admitted to Grey Sloan. Meanwhile, Bailey navigates hospital leadership.
465	17	"Through the Fire"	Linda Klein	Julie Wong	April 30, 2026	2.21
A Station 19 firefighter lands in the ER for severe burn treatment, and the team treats an elderly patient impaled by an art structure.
466	18	"Bridge Over Troubled Water"	Kevin McKidd	Meg Marinis	May 7, 2026	2.69
After a catastrophic bridge collapse sends dozens of victims to Grey Sloan, the hospital activates its full disaster response as they race to treat a surge of critically injured patients, including one of their own. This marks the last episode featuring the reconciled couple Dr. Owen Hunt and Dr. Teddy Altman, portrayed by Kevin McKidd and Kim Raver as series regulars.

== Cast and characters ==
=== Main ===
- Ellen Pompeo as Dr. Meredith Grey
- Chandra Wilson as Dr. Miranda Bailey
- James Pickens Jr. as Dr. Richard Webber
- Kevin McKidd as Dr. Owen Hunt
- Caterina Scorsone as Dr. Amelia Shepherd
- Camilla Luddington as Dr. Jo Wilson
- Jason George as Dr. Ben Warren
- Kim Raver as Dr. Teddy Altman
- Chris Carmack as Dr. Atticus "Link" Lincoln
- Anthony Hill as Dr. Winston Ndugu
- Alexis Floyd as Dr. Simone Griffith
- Harry Shum Jr. as Dr. Benson "Blue" Kwan
- Adelaide Kane as Dr. Jules Millin
- Niko Terho as Dr. Lucas Adams
- Trevor Jackson as Dr. Wes Bryant

=== Recurring ===
- Debbie Allen as Dr. Catherine Fox
- Scott Speedman as Dr. Nick Marsh
- Jaicy Elliot as Dr. Taryn Helm
- Jade Pettyjohn as Dr. Dani Spencer
- Anita Kalathara as Dr. Kavita Mohanty
- Floriana Lima as Nora Young
- Samantha Marie Ware as Katie Rogers
- Sophia Bush as Dr. Cass Beckman
- Jennifer Landon as Dr. Toni Wright
- Sara Paxton as Leticia

=== Notable guests ===
- Natalie Morales as Dr. Monica Beltran
- Kate Burton as Dr. Ellis Grey
- Kelly McCreary as Dr. Maggie Pierce
- Jesse Williams as Dr. Jackson Avery
- Kate Walsh as Dr. Addison Montgomery
- Jamie-Lynn Sigler as Dr. Laura Kaplan
- Debra Mooney as Evelyn Hunt
- Danielle Savre as Maya DeLuca-Bishop

== Production ==
=== Development ===
On April 3, 2025, ABC renewed the series for a twenty-second season with Meg Marinis' third year as showrunner. The season consists of 18 episodes, consistent with the episode order of Season 21. It surpassed the 450 episode mark during episode 2, extending its record as the longest-running American primetime medical drama. Filming began on August 1. Season 22 premiered in the United States on October 9, 2025. On January 30, 2026, filming on the season paused for the day amid the national shutdown by the University of Minnesota, after its crew members didn't show up. Filming on the season resumed the next day.

=== Casting ===
Ellen Pompeo continued to narrate the series and receive star billing, appearing in seven episodes, as she did in Season 21. Chandra Wilson and James Pickens Jr. remain the only original cast members confirmed to appear in all 18 episodes. On October 9, 2025, Trevor Jackson, who guest starred as Dr. Wes Bryant in the last two episodes of Season 21, was promoted to a series regular.

Continuing from last season, the minimum episode guarantee for most series regulars was reduced to 14 out of 18 episodes. However, longtime cast member Caterina Scorsone's role was further scaled back, resulting in a total of 11 appearances for the season. Following her character's sabbatical in episode two, Scorsone was absent for seven episodes, returning for episode 10 in January 2026.

In November 2025, James Pickens Jr. opened up about his prostate cancer diagnosis, which now mirrors the storyline of his character Dr. Richard Webber, who revealed he has cancer in the mid-season finale. Subsequently, he announced being cancer-free.

In December 2025, it was revealed that Kate Walsh will reprise her role as Dr. Addison Montgomery in episode 10, titled "Strip That Down", airing January 29, 2026.

In January 2026, actress Jamie-Lynn Sigler would guest star as Dr. Laura Kaplan, a doctor suffering from multiple sclerosis (MS), in episode which "Heavy on Me," which aired on January 15, 2026. The guest appearance was a nod to Sigler's real life MS condition and was also deemed a way of showing her real life condition openly to a television audience.

On March 25, 2026, it was announced that series regulars Kevin McKidd (Dr. Owen Hunt) and Kim Raver (Dr. Teddy Altman) will depart the series after the season finale.

== Future ==
In February 2026, Grey's Anatomy was reported to likely receive a 23rd season renewal from ABC. The potential renewal was said to involve additional budget reductions, which could affect the episode order and cast. In recent seasons, veteran cast members had already seen their episode guarantees reduced as part of cost-cutting measures, and further cast departures were described as possible. On March 30, 2026, ABC officially renewed the series for a twenty-third season with Meg Marinis' fourth year as showrunner.

== Reception ==
=== Ratings ===
Viewership and ratings per episode of Grey's Anatomy season 22
No.	Title	Air date	Timeslot (ET)	Rating/share (18–49)	Viewers (millions)	DVR (18–49)	DVR viewers (millions)	Total (18–49)	Total viewers (millions)	Ref.
1	"Only the Strong Survive"	October 9, 2025	Thursday 10:00 p.m.	0.3/3	2.61	0.2	1.74	0.4	5.20	
2	"We Built This City"	October 16, 2025	Thursday 10:00 p.m.	0.2/2	2.20	0.3	1.68	0.4	3.90	
3	"Between Two Lungs"	October 23, 2025	Thursday 10:00 p.m.	0.2/3	2.16	0.2	1.56	0.5	3.73	
4	"Goodbye Horses"	October 30, 2025	Thursday 10:00 p.m.	0.2/3	2.13	0.2	1.24	0.4	3.37	
5	"Sometimes I Feel Like a Motherless Child"	November 6, 2025	Thursday 10:00 p.m.	0.2/2	2.04	0.2	1.03	0.3	3.07	
6	"When I Crash"	November 13, 2025	Thursday 10:00 p.m.	0.1/2	1.84	—N/a	—N/a	—N/a	—N/a	
7	"Skyfall"	January 8, 2026	Thursday 10:00 p.m.	0.2/2	2.04	—N/a	—N/a	—N/a	—N/a	
8	"Heavy On Me"	January 15, 2026	Thursday 10:00 p.m.	0.2/3	2.23	—N/a	—N/a	—N/a	—N/a	
9	"Fortunate Son"	January 22, 2026	Thursday 10:00 p.m.	0.2/3	2.45	—N/a	—N/a	—N/a	—N/a	
10	"Strip That Down"	January 29, 2026	Thursday 10:00 p.m.	0.2/3	2.44	—N/a	—N/a	—N/a	—N/a	
11	"(If You Want It) Do It Yourself"	February 26, 2026	Thursday 10:00 p.m.	0.2/3	2.25	—N/a	—N/a	—N/a	—N/a	
12	"Get Lucky"	March 5, 2026	Thursday 10:00 p.m.	0.2/3	2.15	—N/a	—N/a	—N/a	—N/a	
13	"Love the Way You Lie"	March 12, 2026	Thursday 10:00 p.m.	0.2/3	2.22	—N/a	—N/a	—N/a	—N/a	
14	"Wrecking Ball"	March 19, 2026	Thursday 10:00 p.m.	0.2/3	2.37	—N/a	—N/a	—N/a	—N/a	
15	"Take Me to the River"	March 26, 2026	Thursday 10:00 p.m.	0.2/3	2.65	—N/a	—N/a	—N/a	—N/a	
16	"Feel It Still"	April 2, 2026	Thursday 10:00 p.m.	0.2/3	2.38	—N/a	—N/a	—N/a	—N/a	
17	"Through the Fire"	April 30, 2026	Thursday 10:00 p.m.	0.2/2	2.21	—N/a	—N/a	—N/a	—N/a	
18	"Bridge over Troubled Water"	May 7, 2026	Thursday 10:00 p.m.	0.2/4	2.69	—N/a	—N/a	—N/a	—N/a	
