= Daniel Kerrigan =

Daniel Kerrigan may refer to:

- Dan Kerrigan (1843-1880), American pugilist, sportsman, and politician
- Danny Kerrigan (born 1982), English footballer
