= Kerrigan, Missouri =

Extinct hamlet in Missouri, U.S.

Coordinates: 37°00′20″N 90°36′31″W

Kerrigan is a ghost town in southwest Wayne County, in the U.S. state of Missouri.

== History ==
The community was on a ridge approximately 200 feet above the east bank of the Black River at the location called Granite Bend. Granite was quarried at the site and transported by the railroad which followed the east bank of the river.

Kerrigan was laid out in 1886 when the railroad was extended to that point. A post office called Kerrigan was established in 1884 and remained in operation until 1934. The community has the name of William Kerrigan, a railroad official.
