= My Horrible Year! =

- Genre: Family comedy
- Written by: P.J. McIlvaine
- Directed by: Eric Stoltz
- Starring: Allison Mack; Karen Allen; Caterina Scorsone; Dan Petronijevic
- Composer: Richard Band
- Country of origin: United States
- Original language: English

Production
- Running time: 93 minutes

Original release
- Network: Showtime
- Release: July 8, 2001

My Horrible Year! is a 2001 television movie produced for Showtime, starring Allison Mack, Caterina Scorsone, and Dan Petronijevic. The film was directed by Eric Stoltz, and includes a cameo by Bret Hart, the professional wrestler. This production was filmed in Toronto.

The film was nominated for a Daytime Emmy Award for Outstanding Directing in a Children's Special and a Young Artist Award for Best Performance in a TV Movie or Special - Supporting Young Actor.

== Synopsis ==
After fifteen-year-old Nik's (Mack) favorite uncle passes away, she feels like the world is about to collapse and considers suicide. In addition to dealing with typical problems such as school, bullies, wearing braces, body changes, and babysitting, she overhears a portion of a conversation between her parents, causing her to believe that her father is having an affair with her recently widowed aunt, which considerably adds to her stress. She fears that her parents are going to divorce on her sixteenth birthday. With help from her unconventional friends, Mouse and Babyface, she attempts to save her parents' marriage.

== Cast ==
- Karen Allen as Belinda Faulkner
- Allison Mack as Nicola 'Nik' Faulkner
- Caterina Scorsone as 'Babyface' Hamilton
- Dan Petronijevic as Eugene 'Mouse' Donovan
- J. Adam Brown as Zack Bomback
- Jack Duffy as Mr. Birdwell
- Bret Hart as himself
- Jackie Laidlaw as Slow moving nun
- Nicholas Carella as Wrestling store employee
- Mary Wall as Sarah Jane
- Eric Stoltz as Uncle Charlie
- Mimi Rogers as Aunt Marion
