= Owen Hunt =

Fictional character

- Grey's Anatomy character
- The season nine promotional photograph of Kevin McKidd as Dr. Owen Hunt
- First appearance: "Dream a Little Dream of Me, Part 1" (5.01); September 25, 2008 (as recurring cast) "Beat Your Heart Out" (5.14); February 5, 2009 (as series regular)
- Last appearance: "Bridge over Troubled Water" (22.18); May 7, 2026 (as series regular)
- Created by: Shonda Rhimes
- Portrayed by: Kevin McKidd

In-universe information
- Title(s): M.D. F.A.C.S. Major, US Army (inactive)
- Occupation: Head of Trauma Surgery; Interim Chief of Surgery (Former); Chief of Surgery (Former); Board Member (Former)
- Family: Evelyn Hunt (mother); Megan Hunt (sister)
- Spouses: Cristina Yang (m. 2010, div. 2013); Amelia Shepherd (m. 2016, div. 2018); Teddy Altman (m. 2021, div. 2026; reconciled)
- Significant others: Beth Whitman (ex-fiancée); Emma Marling (ex-girlfriend); Carina DeLuca (one-night-stand)
- Children: Leo Hunt (adoptive son); Allison Hunt (with Teddy)
- Relatives: Farouk Shami (nephew, via Megan)
- Born: 1972

Major (Ret.) Owen Hunt, M.D., F.A.C.S., is a fictional character from the medical drama television series Grey's Anatomy, which airs on the American Broadcasting Company (ABC) in the United States. The character was created by series' producer Shonda Rhimes, and is portrayed by Scottish actor Kevin McKidd. He was introduced in Season 5 as a U.S. Army trauma surgeon who served in war-torn Iraq, and subsequently joins the fictional Seattle Grace Hospital to teach medicine as a surgical attending, head of trauma surgery, and eventual chief of surgery, sometimes utilizing unconventional methods. Originally contracted to appear for a multi-episode story arc, he was upgraded to a series regular at the conclusion of his first appearance.

Hunt served as a love interest for surgical fellow Cristina Yang (Sandra Oh) and had an unstable personality when first introduced, suffering from post-traumatic stress disorder (PTSD). McKidd's on-screen chemistry with Oh received critical acclaim, with Matt Roush of TV Guide calling the "instant sparks" between McKidd and Oh "electrifying". Chris Monfette of IGN praised the addition of "fresh, new characters" like Owen Hunt.

== Storylines ==
Before his regular appearances on the show, Owen Hunt was a United States Army surgeon, specializing in trauma surgery. He held the rank of Major. The character makes a dramatic first appearance when he performs a tracheotomy on a man with a pen, winning the admiration of resident Cristina Yang (Sandra Oh). He is offered a job by former chief of surgery Richard Webber (James Pickens, Jr.), but declines, explaining that he has not completed his tour in Iraq. His appointment as the new head of trauma surgery at Seattle Grace Hospital was not well-received initially. By his first week he manages to irk both Derek Shepherd (Patrick Dempsey) and Mark Sloan (Eric Dane), head of neurosurgery and plastic surgery, respectively, who view his treatment of some of the patients as crude, and also rebuffed by resident Izzie Stevens (Katherine Heigl) when he stabs a set of pigs and then orders the residents and interns to save their lives, in order to teach them medicine on "live tissue". Hunt eventually embarks on a relationship with Yang, but it comes to a sudden close when his PTSD gets the best of him, and he unconsciously strangles her. Soon after the breakup, he begins therapy with the hospital psychiatrist, Dr. Wyatt. Some time later, a soldier visits the hospital for treatment, and his presence influences Owen to contemplate returning to the US Army. When he shares this with Cristina, she disagrees with his decision, stating that she doesn't want him to die, and the two eventually rekindle their relationship. Owen brings in Teddy Altman (Kim Raver), his best friend and colleague from when he was in the army, as the new head of cardiothoracic surgery. When it is revealed that Hunt and Altman may be potential lovers, Hunt and Yang's relationship is challenged, and eventually concluded by Yang.

During a hospital shooting, Owen is shot and injured, attracting the sympathy of Cristina, who subsequently restores their relationship. Due to the emotional reverberations of the shooting crisis, Owen and Cristina decide to wed one another shortly after their reconciliation, not wanting to risk separation. There are some concerns from Cristina's friends that Owen is taking advantage of her PTSD to rush her into marriage, which she had previously decided against. When Cristina discovers she is pregnant, Owen is displeased with her desire to abort the baby, and the two separate from each other. One of the major, recurring points of conflict in their relationship are Owen's strong desires for children and a traditional wife, and Cristina's equally strong conviction that she never wants children. In the fallout of resident Meredith Grey (Ellen Pompeo) tampering with Derek Shepherd's Alzheimer's trial, Owen is promoted to Chief of Surgery after Webber steps down. After substantial thought, Owen reluctantly decides to accompany Cristina to the abortion, uniting the two. Owen's friendship with Teddy ends when Owen lies to Teddy about her husband's sudden death, due to Owen wanting her to finish a surgery she was currently performing and Teddy blaming Owen for her husband's death. Feeling abandoned and disconcerted after an altercation with Cristina, Owen has a one-night stand with a patient's friend. Cristina consequently finds out, terminates their relationship, and their marriage is tested. After Cristina passed her medical boards, she reconciles with Owen, but reveals to him that she is leaving Seattle to go to Mayo Clinic. Teddy and Owen eventually became friends again. She had been offered a position at the United States Army Medical Command but chose to stay at Seattle Grace Mercy West out of loyalty. After Teddy's husband Henry dies she wallows in her grief and it affects her colleagues and residents, causing Owen to "fire" her so that she can have a fresh start elsewhere. He also fires April Kepner (Sarah Drew) because the hospital cannot afford to keep her due to her not being Board certified. Months later, Hunt visits Kepner and rehires her as he realized he made a mistake. In later seasons, Owen and Kepner become close friends due to her choice to sign up with the military, a decision Owen helped prompt and encourage, and a decision which leads to the eventual end of Kepner's marriage to Jackson Avery (Jesse Williams).

In Season 9, Cristina and Owen's marriage is again very strained. Cristina is working at Mayo Clinic and Owen is in Seattle but she eventually returns and then Owen asks for a divorce. He later shows that he is still in love with her and only asked for a divorce so Cristina and the others involved in the plane crash could get the money. Cristina and Owen reconcile in episode 9 before Miranda Bailey's (Chandra Wilson) wedding.

In Season 10, Cristina decides to accept a job to run a state of the art clinic in Switzerland. Owen supports her decision as he realizes no good could come from him asking her to stay. He requests that Cristina not to leave him until she has to leave him for good, and they spend the two weeks leading to her permanent departure together. While saying her farewell to her colleagues of the last seven years, there is a possible act of terrorism in Seattle, which later turns out to be just a gas main explosion. Cristina has a quick but emotional goodbye hug with Derek, Bailey, and Webber; leaves her shares of the hospital to Alex; and dances it out with Meredith one last time to an old favorite song. Owen, however, is busy saving a patient in the operating room so they share a silent goodbye through the gallery's glass.

In Season 11, Owen develops a relationship with Amelia Shepherd (Caterina Scorsone). This is on-and-off throughout Seasons 11 and 12 until the end of Season 12 where he and Amelia get married, after Amelia proposes to him. Owen is attracted to Amelia's desire for a "real family" and children.

In Season 14, after going through a series of marital issues, Owen decides to pursue a divorce from Amelia, citing Amelia's reversal on wanting to have children and her increasingly erratic behavior. Owen listens to Amelia when she, in a fit of pique, tells him to go be with Teddy. As a result, he flies to Germany to be with Teddy, but after they spend the night together, Owen reveals he is there at his wife's suggestion. Teddy is insulted he made her a last choice, citing his inability to be alone, and Teddy breaks it off. Owen returns to Grey Sloan alone. It is later discovered that Amelia's behavior was caused by a brain tumor. In a reversal of blame, Amelia is angry that Owen placed sole blame on her for their marital issues, as well as committing adultery with Teddy, since he ignored all of her tumor symptoms as selfishness and poor character. Despite pursuing their divorce, they continue sleeping together. Owen decides to pursue his lifelong dream of fatherhood alone and begins fostering Leo, a baby who was given up by his teenage mother. When Amelia finds Leo's mother, Betty, homeless and addicted to drugs, Amelia takes Betty in, and, together, Owen and Amelia take care of Leo and Betty at Owen's home, reconciling and deciding to stay in their relationship and renew their marriage.

In Season 15, Owen and Amelia have a strong relationship, which is interrupted by the news that Teddy is pregnant with Owen's child. Teddy did not tell Owen at first, because she knew he would leave Amelia for the chance to be a father, and Teddy does not want to be with Owen after he made her his alternate choice. Owen is upset because he would not have reconciled with Amelia or fostered Leo if Teddy had told him earlier that he was expecting a biological child. This causes additional tension with Amelia, who knows Owen would have left her without trying to salvage their marriage. In light of Teddy's disinterest, Owen tells Amelia he chooses her. However, Owen continues to exhibit possessive and obsessive behavior over Teddy and her pregnancy, causing Amelia to permanently split from their relationship. Owen then adopts Leo as his son and welcomes his newborn daughter, Allison, with Teddy, whom they named after Teddy's best friend Allison Brown, who died during the collapse of the second tower on September 11, 2001. Teddy has a change of mind and decides to try a relationship with Owen.

In Season 16, Owen is in a relationship with Teddy, whom he had previously given his position as Grey-Sloan's Head of Trauma to keep her in the country. Owen has a contentious relationship with the new Chief of Surgery, Koracick, whom Teddy had dated during her pregnancy. After Owen accidentally electrocutes his genitals, Koracick takes out a restraining order against Owen, requiring him to be 500 feet away. Teddy has been finding motherhood overwhelming and hating her maternity leave, so Owen decides to take paternity leave to allow her to return to work. His paternity leave turns into a resignation. Owen eventually accepts an offer from Karev to become Chief of Trauma at Pac-North after he finds stay-at-home parenting overwhelming and boring, though when Pac-North merges with Grey Sloan, Owen returns to Grey Sloan. At the end of the season, Owen discovers that Teddy is cheating on him with Koracick after Teddy accidentally sends Owen a voicemail of her and Koracick having sex.

In Season 17, Owen confronts Teddy about her affair and ends their engagement. He and Teddy butt heads at work, as Owen is unable to forgive Teddy, but he eventually offers her friendship after she falls in a catatonic state from overworking herself in the COVID-19 pandemic frontlines. Owen and Teddy start sleeping with each other again, and in the season finale, Owen proposes to Teddy, which she accepts.

In the beginning of Season 18, Owen and Teddy got married at the Emerald City Bar after their wedding at the Park was interrupted by a bicycle accident.

== Development ==
=== Casting and creation ===
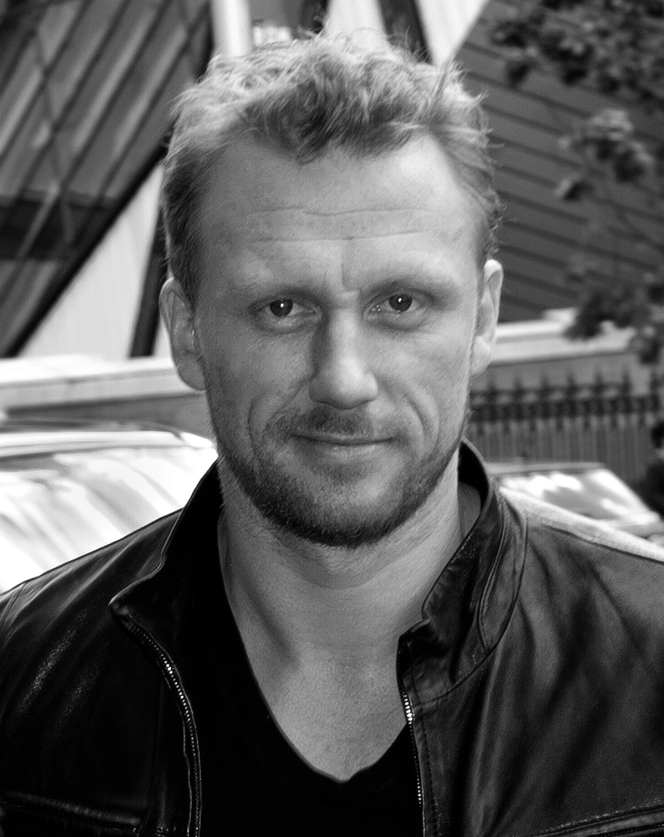
McKidd had to postpone his appointment with series' creator Shonda Rhimes due to it being his son's birthday.

Shonda Rhimes, the series' creator, stated that the character was envisioned as "an old-fashioned tortured hero" and likened him to Heathcliff from Wuthering Heights. Originally set to appear in a multi-episode story arc, Kevin McKidd's contract was extended, securing him a place as a series regular on Grey's Anatomy. In July 2008, Entertainment Weekly reported the possibility of McKidd becoming a series regular, which was eventually confirmed by People Magazine. When asked of how he got involved with the show, McKidd offered the insight:

I was doing a movie off and on for three months, and it was my son's birthday, so I managed to land back in LA. around 2 p.m. Then I got a call from my agent, saying, "You have to turn back around because Shonda wants to meet you for this role on Grey’s." I was like, "I'd love to meet her, but I can't. Can we do tomorrow?" And they're family-friendly, so they were really understanding. As soon as I heard the pitch for the character, I was sold on it. It's a different energy and a different viewpoint. I thought it was an important story to tell, especially on a prime-time TV show. To get in there and get your hands dirty and explore what trauma surgery is like in war zones and what it's like to rehabilitate yourself to civilian life. It's not just a new doctor showing up. It's exploring how hard it is to reintegrate yourself back into the real world after being in the war zone for three tours.

McKidd told BuddyTV, "It's been really great. I was nervous when I started because every job I've ever done before this, I have been in the job right from day one when everybody's new and getting to know each other. So I was nervous because I had never done this before. And I feel really grateful to the Grey's cast and crew and everyone there, really, because they've been so nice to me, gracious, and accepting of me joining the show. The transition was much easier than I thought it might be, which I'm very grateful for." McKidd also shared with People Magazine that he thinks Grey's Anatomy is a great show and feels lucky to be part of it. Shonda Rhimes, the series' creator, said of his addition, "I am excited to have Kevin McKidd joining us for the season. He's been a delight to collaborate with and brings incredible passion, talent, and creativity to his work. Plus, he’s already got the ‘Mc’ built into his name, so we had to keep him."

=== Characterization ===
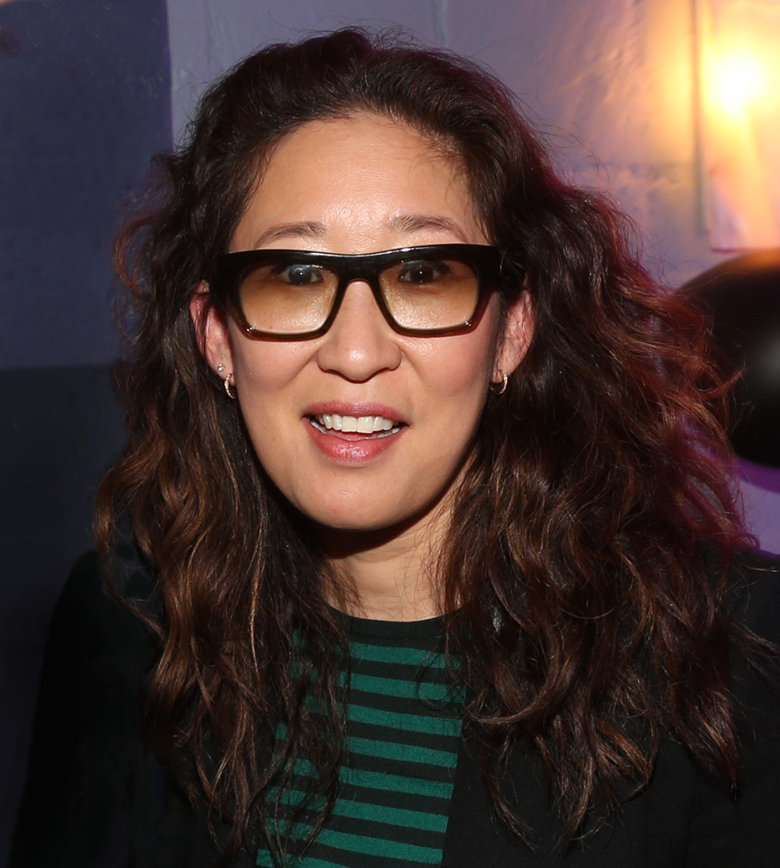
McKidd and Oh's characters' relationship and connection has been a major aspect of Owen's characterization

The American Broadcasting Company (ABC) characterized Hunt as "confident," "innovative," and "intelligent," while also describing him as "aggressive," "brazen," "presumptuous," "hasty," and "rash". McKidd said of his character: "[...] He's not an easy character to connect to, I think. There's some darkness to him and there's some danger to him that I think is really interesting and exciting to play. [...]" Additionally, McKidd describes Hunt as "very instinctive, follows his gut, and is very impulsive and immediate. He immediately assesses a situation. And he's very honest, sometimes painfully honest, with himself and with others. He wants to make himself better, to improve as a person. He's a decent guy, a sort of guy I'd like to go out and have a beer with." Hunt's unorthodox teaching methods have been the subject of controversy. McKidd said of this:

"You know, I think, at the end of the day, [Owen]'s basically a good man who has some pretty extreme teaching techniques that he learned in the army. And all these things that are in the show are actually the way trauma surgeons are taught. But I think probably beyond that, he very much just calls a spade a spade and looks at each scenario. He's not trying to be difficult. He just looks at each scenario and each case and each patient and knows what is needed and when to cut to the chase, and doesn't want to mess about with the periphery of it. And sometimes that gets him into trouble, and sometimes that is for the best. So, it'd be interesting and kind of exciting to see where he goes."

— Kevin McKidd, BuddyTV

The look of Owen has been described as hardcore and the antithesis of the other male characters on the show. McKidd explains that it’s not just Owen's appearance but also the fact that, in his profession, he is dealing with life and death every day. One key distinction McKidd finds between his character and the others is that Owen does not care what other people think of him. When McKidd returned after his first appearance, his character seemed to have changed. McKidd told TV Guide: "Yes, that was who he really is in the premiere, but now we're seeing what can happen to a good man, a good soldier, and a good surgeon [because of war]."

There's a great debate there for what the dynamic is, with what Cristina has done to this marriage and her choice and what Owen's choice is and his behavior. There's a really interesting conversation to be had because of those choices: How do you move on? How does that change the dynamic of the relationship? If you can really dive into that -- there's two betrayals, very big ones. I don't know how they sustain that relationship. I don't know how you come back from that kind of betrayal. Certainly if you're married, the notion of the next step would be to have children and if that's been taken away, I would find it very hard for Owen to stay in that relationship.

— Patrick Dempsey (Derek Shepherd) on Owen and Cristina's relationship, involving Cristina's no desire to bear children.

The character of Owen Hunt had an almost instant attraction to Cristina Yang from his first appearance at Seattle Grace, illustrated by the passionate kiss they share soon after meeting. Owen's story and connection with Cristina has been a topic of discussion. McKidd remarked: "Between him [Owen] and her [Cristina], it’s going to get really complex, and kind of tense and explosive." Owen and Cristina have experienced roadblocks in their fictional relationship, and continue to. McKidd offered this insight on his character's relationship with Cristina:

It's not going to be easy for them. What I read when I read the season premiere, and this is just my take on it, is that it was very much two very analytical people, Owen and Cristina. They're very similar in a way, I think, as people. Two analytical people see each other over a crowded ER room and their eyes meet. It's almost more complicated, but on a really simplistic level, it's almost a love at first sight scenario that happened on the season premiere. And then, what we're seeing is the road to connect that back, because obviously the season premiere was before he went back to Iraq and this event has happened to him that's changed him. And so, they're trying to get that feeling back because there's obviously something really true and meant to be between these two people. But it's complicated right now because she's damaged because of what's happened to her, and he is certainly struggling with himself and the people around him and the world in general, and trying to keep himself together after what's happened to him. So, I think, it's exciting to see what happens with these two guys because, in a way, they're the two people you'd least expect to have a love affair, but it's happening to them and they can't stop it.

McKidd has referred to his character and Cristina Yang as "soulmates". Speaking of Owen's PTSD storyline, McKidd stated: "What's exciting about telling this story with this character is that it's quite brave of ABC and Shonda [Rhimes], on a primetime network TV show, to address a tough subject, and one that people don't necessarily want to hear about. But so far, the writing room is handling it beautifully. They're not banging people over the head with it but exploring it in a sensitive and interesting way." Owen and Cristina struggled with their fictional relationship in Season 8, culminating in Owen having a sexual affair. Directly before the episode involving the affair aired, McKidd told Entertainment Weekly: "The thing about Owen is that he tries to do things perfectly, and obviously, he messes up as the chief because you have to make these odd black-and-white decisions, and sometimes you make the wrong decision. There’s a lot of stress in his life at the moment, so he’s trying not to let that affect his efficiency as chief." Although the characters' marriage was tested, McKidd reported to The Hollywood Reporter: "I think they're meant for each other. I hold out faith in Cristina and Owen, even though they go to the darkest places out of all the couples on the show. It's going to get worse, but it's going to get better soon."

== Reception ==
The character has received generally positive feedback from television critics. Weeks after Hunt's first appearance on the show, Matt Roush of TV Guide commented that "Hunt/McKidd is the most encouraging thing to happen to Grey's Anatomy in quite a while", adding that "the instant sparks between him [Hunt] and Yang were electrifying". On the other hand, Robert Rorke of the New York Post stated that McKidd was brought in as Hunt to "boost the sagging fortunes" of the show's ratings. Kelley L. Carter of USA Today described Hunt as "hardcore" and "the antithesis of the other males on the show". Chris Monfette of IGN praised the fifth season of Grey's Anatomy as an improvement on the previous two seasons, attributing this in part to the introduction of "fresh, new characters" like Owen and Arizona Robbins (Jessica Capshaw). He also referred to McKidd as "Season 5's best, most effective addition", adding:

Not only is McKidd an immediately likeable and engaging actor, his struggle with PTSD throughout the season – and especially how it impacted his burgeoning relationship with Cristina – proved both relevant and dramatically gripping. His interactions with Cristina were perfectly balanced for optimum drama, never together and never apart for so long that the back-and-forth became frustrating. Viewers could clearly see a softening of the typically hard-edged Cristina, a pleasant change for what had become something of a one-note character, as well as relate to Owen's internal struggles, shared by many a real-life war vet.

Margaret Lyons of New York Magazine judged Hunt as "too sad" during the first part of the ninth season.

== Awards ==
In 2010, Kevin McKidd was nominated for the Prism Award for Best Performance in a Drama Series' Multi-Episode Storyline, and he won the award. In 2011, McKidd was nominated for the Prism Award for Best Performance in a Drama Series for his work on Grey's Anatomy. McKidd, along with the rest of the Grey's Anatomy cast, was nominated for Best Drama Series at the 21st GLAAD Media Awards in 2010. Also in 2010, McKidd and the cast were nominated for Outstanding Drama Series at the NAACP Image Awards. The same nomination was received at the 2011 NAACP Image Awards, with the cast winning the award. At the 43rd NAACP Image Awards in 2012, McKidd and the cast were nominated yet again for Outstanding Drama Series.
