= John Kerrigan =

John Kerrigan may refer to:

- John Kerrigan, one of several noms de plume of Charles Whiting (1926–2007), British novelist and historian
- John Kerrigan (literary scholar) (born 1956), professor of English at Cambridge University
- John Kerrigan (New York City) (born 1851), New York politician
- John E. Kerrigan (1908–1987), U.S. politician
- J. Warren Kerrigan (1879–1947), American actor
- John J. Kerrigan (1932–1996), member of the Boston School Committee, 1968–1976
