= Karigan =

Karigan كريگان
- Village
- Location within Iran
- Coordinates: 29°04′21″N 57°46′17″E
- Country: Iran
- Province: Kerman
- County: Jiroft
- Bakhsh: Sarduiyeh
- Rural District: Gevar

Population (2006)
  - Total: 309
- Time zone: UTC+3:30 (IRST)
  - Summer (DST): UTC+4:30 (IRDT)

Karigan (Persian: كريگان, also Romanized as Karīgān; also known as Gavīgān (Persian: گويگان) and Gūy Kan) is a village in Gevar Rural District, Sarduiyeh District, Jiroft County, Kerman Province, Iran. At the 2006 census, its population was 309, in 77 families.
