= T. S. Kerrigan =

American poet (born 1939)

Thomas Sherman Kerrigan (born 15 March 1939) is an American poet.

== Life ==
He was born in Los Angeles where he still lives. He attended the University of California and Loyola University Law School. He was admitted to the California Bar in 1965. He has served as President of the Irish American Bar Association and successfully defended a law created in the Great Depression to protect workers before the United States Supreme Court in 2001 (Lujan v. G&G Fire Sprinklers, Inc., 532 U.S. 189, decided April 17, 2001).

== Writing ==
His poetry has appeared in important periodicals on both sides of the Atlantic and in the Garrison Keillor anthology, Good Poems (Viking/Penguin 2002) and in Literature and Its Writers (Bedford/St. Martins 2006). He is also the author of two produced plays and a former drama critic affiliated with the Los Angeles Drama Critics' Circle.

== Publications ==
- Another Bloomsday at Molly Malone's Pub (The Inevitable Press, 1999)
- The Shadow Sonnets and Other Poems (ISBN 0977696006, Scienter Press 2006).

== Sources ==
- See The Legal Studies Forum XXX, No. 1 and 2, 2006
