= Danny Kerrigan =

English footballer (born 1982)

Personal information
- Full name: Daniel Anthony Kerrigan
- Date of birth: 4 July 1982 (age 44)
- Place of birth: Basildon, England
- Height: 5 ft 7 in (1.70 m)
- Positions: Defender; midfielder

Senior career*
Years	Team	Apps	(Gls)
1999–2002	Southend United	15	(0)
2002–2003	Billericay Town		
2003	Grays Athletic		
2003–2004	Hornchurch		
2004–2008	Billericay Town		
2008	Heybridge Swifts		
2008–2008	Wivenhoe Town		
2009–2010	Canvey Island		
2010–2012	Billericay Town		
- * Club domestic league appearances and goals

Daniel Anthony Kerrigan (born 4 July 1982) is an English semi-professional footballer who plays as a defender or midfielder. He played in the Football League with Southend United, before dropping into non-League football.

== Career ==
Kerrigan started his football career with Southend United, making his debut in the Third Division in the 1–1 away draw to Carlisle United on 2 October 1999, replacing Nathan Jones as a substitute in the 80th minute. He made a total of 19 appearances in all competitions for Southend, before being released in 2002. He signed for Billericay Town in summer 2002, following his release from Southend United. In April 2003, he joined Isthmian League Premier Division club Grays Athletic, following a budget cut at Billericay. George Borg then signed Kerrigan for Grays' rivals Hornchurch in September, Hornchurch were deducted one point in November, due to fielding Kerrigan in a 1–1 draw with Heybridge Swifts when he was not registered with the club. He went on to rejoin Billericay Town again, before being released along with Darren Blewitt in May 2008. Kerrigan signed for Heybridge Swifts in July 2009, before signing for Wivenhoe Town two months later in September.
