= Caterina Scorsone =

Canadian actress

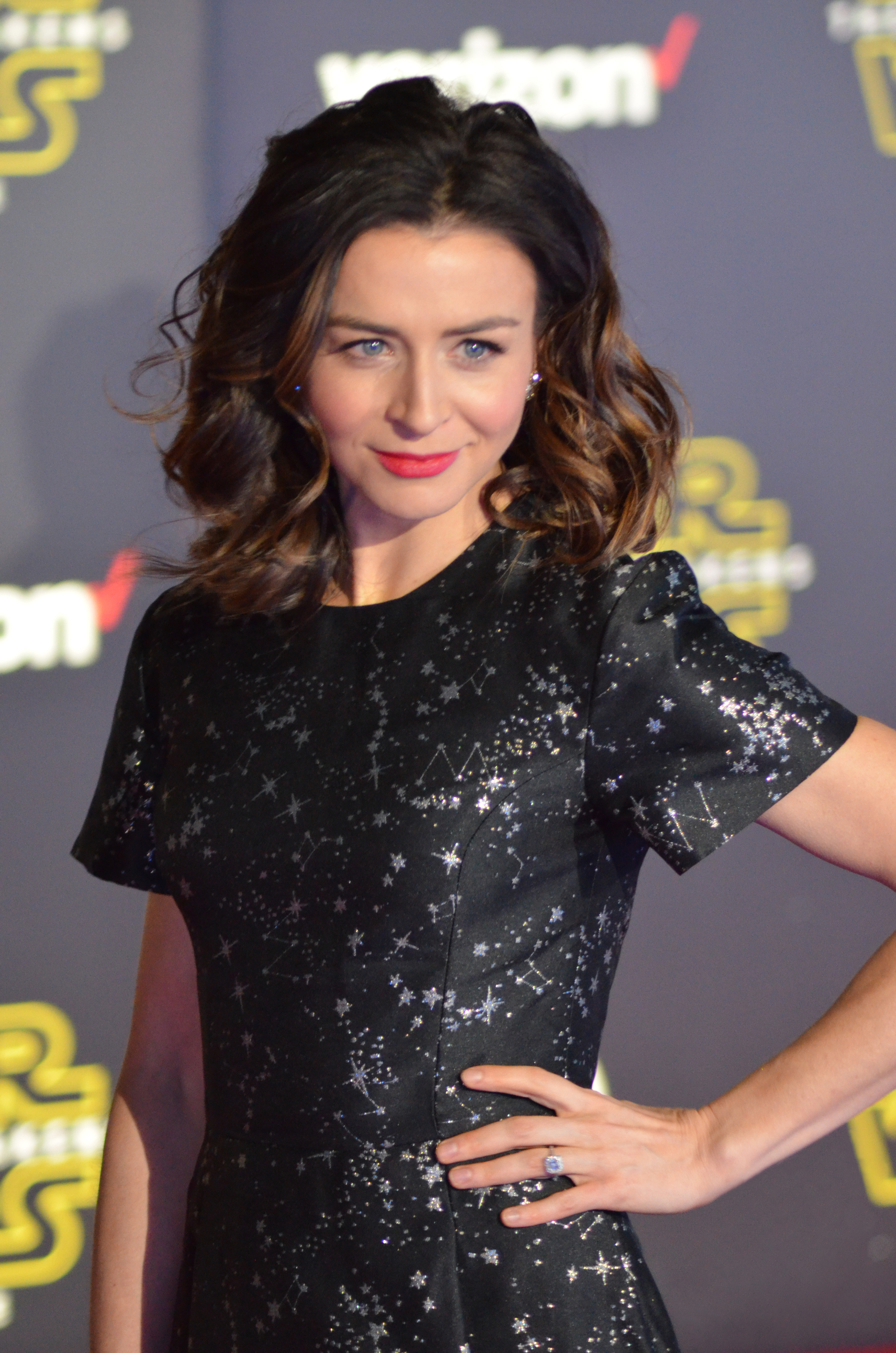
- Scorsone at the world premiere of Star Wars: The Force Awakens
- Born: Toronto, Ontario, Canada
- Education: Trinity College, Toronto
- Occupation: Actress
- Years active: 1989–present
- Spouse: Rob Giles (m. 2009; div. 2020)
- Children: 3

Caterina Scorsone is a Canadian actress. She is best known for her portrayal of neurosurgeon Dr. Amelia Shepherd on the ABC primetime medical drama Grey's Anatomy (2010–present) and its spin-offs Private Practice (2010–2013) and Station 19 (2020–2024). Prior to this, she made her debut as a child actor on the Canadian children's program Mr. Dressup. She also appeared in a number of films, notably Edge of Darkness (2010), and The November Man (2014). Other television credits include Michelle Parker on Power Play, Jess Mastriani on Missing, Callie Wilkinson on Crash, and Alice Hamilton on Alice.

== Early life and education ==
Scorsone was born in Toronto, Ontario. She is the middle child of five in her family. Her father, Antonio Bruno Scorsone, is a social worker, and her mother, Suzanne Rozell Scorsone, is a social anthropologist. She is of Italian descent. Her four siblings include: older twin sisters, Jovanna and Francesca (who serves as a chaplain in the Canadian Army, holding the rank of major), and a younger sister (Deborah Scorsone) and a brother. She attended the Cardinal Carter Academy for the Arts in Toronto, as well as alternative school Subway Academy II. She majored in literary studies and minored in philosophy at Trinity College in the University of Toronto, finishing her studies in 2006.

== Career ==
Scorsone's first TV appearances were in Goosebumps adaptation of Night of the Living Dummy II the Goosebumps Chillogy miniseries, consisting of three episodes, then she progressed to regular guest spots as a child on the Canadian children's TV show Mr. Dressup. In 1998, she had a role in one installment of CBC Radio's The Mystery Project called Peggy Delaney as Amber, an estranged fifteen-year-old daughter who comes from Vancouver to stay with her mom for a school term in Toronto.

Scorsone had her breakthrough after landing the leading role in the Lifetime crime drama series Missing, from 2003 to 2006. She played the part of Jess Mastriani, a young woman who sees missing persons in visions. After Jess saved some missing persons, she joined the FBI, where a special squad was formed around her, to find missing persons. In 2009, she starred as Alice Hamilton on the Showcase TV miniseries Alice which was later broadcast on Syfy in America.

In 2010, Scorsone joined the cast of Shonda Rhimes' drama series Private Practice in the recurring role of Dr. Amelia Shepherd, the sister of Derek Shepherd from Grey's Anatomy. She was cast after Eric Stoltz, who was directing one of the show's episodes, heard about the role of Amelia and remembered Scorsone from working with her on My Horrible Year! He mentioned her to Shonda Rhimes and commented on the resemblance Scorsone had to Patrick Dempsey (the actor who plays Derek Shepherd). Scorsone was promoted to series regular for Private Practice in 2010. She appeared in the third episode of the seventh season of Grey's Anatomy where Amelia and Derek started to reconcile their differences.

In March 2014, Scorsone returned to Grey's Anatomy after a two-year absence as a recurring guest star. In June of the same year, it was announced that she was promoted to series regular status for the show's eleventh season. In October 2025, as part of cost-cutting measures during the show's twenty-second season, Scorsone's minimum episode guarantee was reduced to 10 appearances, with her character, Dr. Amelia Shepherd, taking a seven-episode sabbatical—a gap that marks the actress's longest continuous absence from the series since becoming a regular.

== Personal life ==
Scorsone married Rob Giles of The Rescues in June 2009. The couple has three daughters; Eliza, Paloma Michaela "Pippa" and Arwen Lucinda "Lucky".

Her first pregnancy was written into her character's storyline in season 5 of Private Practice, along with her third pregnancy in Grey's Anatomy's sixteenth season.

She became an outspoken advocate for children with Down syndrome and other cognitive disabilities after her daughter, Pippa, was born with the disorder. She received the Quincy Jones Exceptional Advocacy Award from the Global Down Syndrome Foundation on November 14, 2020, for her advocacy.

Scorsone and Giles separated in March 2020 and filed for divorce two months later.

== Filmography ==
=== Film ===
Year	Title	Role	Notes
1995	When the Dark Man Calls	Angie	Television film
1995	Shock Treatment	Robyn Belmore	Television film
1998	Teen Knight	Alison	
1998	The Hairy Bird	Susie	
1998	Rescuers: Stories of Courage: Two Families	Irena Csizmadia	Television film
1999	The Devil's Arithmetic	Jessica	Television film
1999	The Third Miracle	Maria Witkowski	
2000	Rated X	Liberty	Television film
2000	Common Ground	Peggy	Television film
2001	Borderline Normal	Beth	Television film
2001	My Horrible Year!	'Babyface' Hamilton	Television film
2009	Alice	Alice	Television film Nominated—Gemini Award for Best Performance by an Actress in a Leading Role in a Dramatic Program or Mini-Series
2010	Edge of Darkness	Melissa	
2014	The November Man	Celia	
2023	Dragon Tales	Alison	

=== Television ===
Year	Title	Role	Notes
1996	Ready or Not	Colleen	Episode: "The Girlfriend"
1996	Flash Forward	Darby	Episode: "Saboteurs"
1996	Psi Factor: Chronicles of the Paranormal	Megan Lester	Episode: "Possession/Man Out of Time"
1998	Once a Thief	Alice "Allegra" Mansfield	Episode: "Little Sister"
1996, 1998	Goosebumps	Jessica Walters / Sara Kramer	4 episodes
1998–2000	Power Play	Michelle Parker	Recurring role; 26 episodes Nominated—Gemini Award for Best Performance by an Actress in a Featured Supporting Role in a Dramatic Series (1999)
2002	The Associates	Anna Clay	2 episodes
2003–2006	Missing	FBI Agent Jessica "Jess" Mastriani	Main cast; 55 episodes
2008	The Border	Sorrayya Bulut	Episode: "Enemy Contact"
2009	The Guard	Beth	Episode: "The Beacon"
2008–2009	Crash	Callie Wilkinson	4 episodes
2009	Castle	Joanne Delgado	Episode: "Home Is Where the Heart Stops"
2010–2013	Private Practice	Dr. Amelia Shepherd	Recurring role (season 3); Main cast (seasons 4–6); 62 episodes—Prism Award for Best Female Performance in a Drama Series Multi-Episode Storyline (2012)
2010, 2012, 2014–present	Grey's Anatomy	Dr. Amelia Shepherd	Guest role (seasons 7–8); Recurring role (season 10); Main cast (season 11–present); 226 episodes
2020, 2022, 2024	Station 19	Dr. Amelia Shepherd	Guest role (seasons 3–4, season 6–7); 5 episodes
