= Kevin McKidd =

Scottish actor (born 1973)

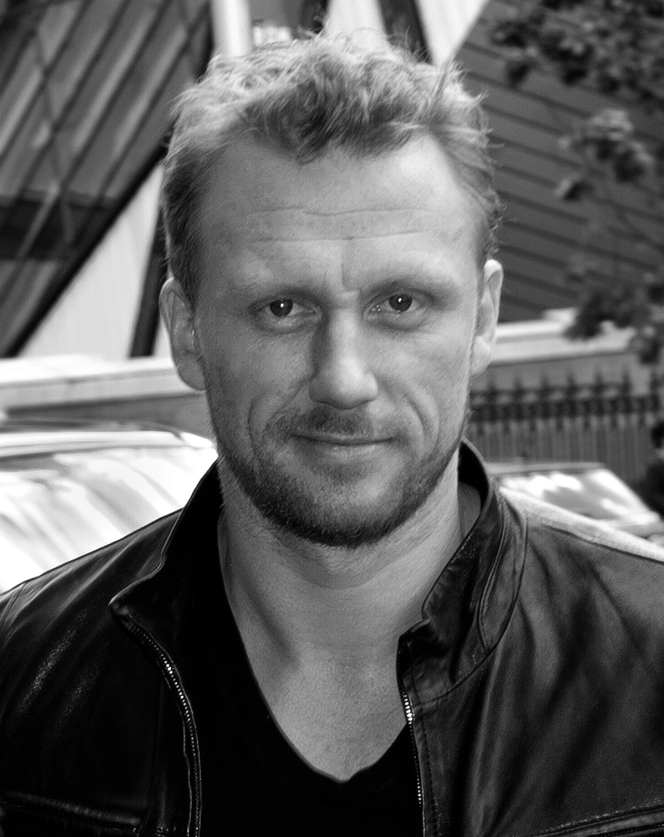
- McKidd in 2010
- Born: 9 August 1973 (age 53); Elgin, Moray, Scotland
- Citizenship: United Kingdom; United States (since 2015)
- Education: University of Edinburgh; Queen Margaret University
- Occupations: Actor; director
- Years active: 1991–present
- Spouses: Jane Parker (m. 1999; div. 2017) Arielle Goldrath (m. 2018; div. 2023)
- Partner: Danielle Savre (2023–present)
- Children: 4
- Website: kevinmckiddonline.com

Kevin Robert McKidd (born 9 August 1973) is a Scottish actor and television director best known for portraying Dr. Owen Hunt in Grey's Anatomy (2008–2026), Lucius Vorenus in Rome (2005–2007) and Tommy Mackenzie in Danny Boyle's Trainspotting (1996). His voice acting work includes portraying John "Soap" MacTavish in the video games Call of Duty: Modern Warfare 2 (2009) and its 2011 sequel; and as Lord MacGuffin and his son in the Pixar film Brave (2012).

== Early life ==
McKidd was born on 9 August 1973, in Elgin, Moray, Scotland, the son of Kathleen, a secretary, and Neil McKidd, a plumber. He grew up on a council estate in Elgin. At 17, McKidd worked at the Macallan distillery in Speyside. He later went to work with the Lumsden family of coppersmiths. He attended Seafield Primary School and Elgin Academy. and was a member of the local amateur dramatic group, Moray Youth Theatre. Planning to study engineering, he initially attended the University of Edinburgh, then decided to audition at Edinburgh's Queen Margaret University, where he was accepted to study Drama. He joined Edinburgh University's student theatre company, Bedlam Theatre, where he was a member of the improvisational comedy troupe The Improverts.

== Career ==
After playing Tommy Mackenzie in Trainspotting, McKidd was cast as Father Deegan in the 1996 Christmas episode of Father Ted. Subsequent roles include Malky Johnson in Small Faces. In 2004, he played James Hepburn, 4th Earl of Bothwell, the third husband of Mary, Queen of Scots, in the BBC mini-series Gunpowder, Treason & Plot.

In 1999, he was part of an ensemble cast in Mike Leigh's Topsy Turvy, depicting the development of Gilbert and Sullivan's The Mikado. The actors researched their historical characters and used this knowledge during extensive rehearsals to help develop dialogue for scenes blocked out by Leigh. McKidd, like the rest of the cast, did his own singing in the Gilbert and Sullivan operettas portrayed in the film. He drew on his own experience of performing light opera, having had small roles with his hometown Elgin Operatic Society in his youth.

In 2001, he played Elliot in the British film Understanding Jane, directed by Caleb Lindsay. He appeared in Ridley Scott's Kingdom of Heaven, and in the 2002 film adaptation of Nicholas Nickleby. In Neil Marshall's horror film Dog Soldiers, he appeared as Pte Lawrence Cooper. In the 2005 BBC drama, The Virgin Queen, he played Thomas Howard, 4th Duke of Norfolk.

In 1998, McKidd was in the four part BBC2 series Looking After Jo Jo, playing the role of Basil. He was also one of the main stars of the joint HBO/BBC series Rome, where his portrayal of the soldier-politician Lucius Vorenus received critical acclaim.

McKidd starred in the premiere of Caryl Churchill's newest play, Far Away. He played Todd, the romantic partner of Joan, and her co-worker as hat maker.

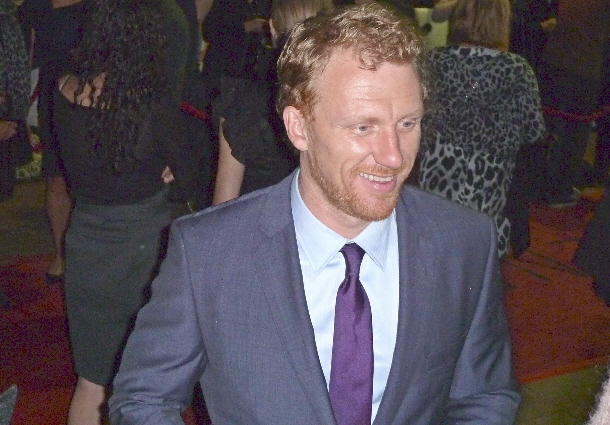
McKidd at Toronto Film Fest 2010

Additional work includes his role in the Silence of the Lambs prequel Hannibal Rising (2007). In late 2007, McKidd began his role as the lead character in the American fantasy television series Journeyman on NBC. Despite starting out with a strong audience, the show lost about half of its viewership throughout its run and suffered from the fractious situation in the United States due to the writer's strike at the time. Thirteen episodes were produced.

His role in Rome led to McKidd's casting in the medical drama series Grey's Anatomy as Dr. Owen Hunt. He made his directorial debut in the series's seventh season, directing the episode "Don't Deceive Me (Please Don't Go)". He won the award for "Best Performance in a Drama Series Multi-Episode Storyline" at the 14th Prism Awards for his work in Grey's Anatomy. McKidd and his co-star Kim Raver will depart the series after the season 22 finale. He played the role of Poseidon, god of the seas, and the father of Percy Jackson in the 2010 film Percy Jackson & the Olympians: The Lightning Thief.

McKidd has done voice work and voiced the character of Jezz Torrent, flame haired lead singer of the fictional Scottish hard rock band Love Fist in the video game Grand Theft Auto: Vice City. He also provided the voice of Captain John "Soap" MacTavish in Call of Duty: Modern Warfare 2 and its 2011 sequel. In 2012, he voiced the characters of Lord MacGuffin and his son Young MacGuffin in the Disney/Pixar film Brave. Having grown up in Elgin, McKidd used a variation of the Doric dialect for Young MacGuffin, and one of the running gags of his lines is that not even Lord MacGuffin is entirely sure what Young MacGuffin is saying.

== Speyside Sessions ==
McKidd instigated The Speyside Sessions, a Scottish folk music album recorded in 2011/12 at Hogmanay in his home town of Elgin. Many of the contributors to the album were old school friends of McKidd's. The album was released on 15 June 2012 in aid of Save the Children.

== Personal life ==
McKidd married Jane Parker in 1999. They have two children, a son and a daughter. In August 2015, McKidd and his family became US citizens. The couple said in July 2016 that they were separating and have been divorced since December 2017.

McKidd married Arielle Goldrath in a Jewish ceremony on 13 January 2018. On 13 May 2018, they had a son. Their daughter was born 27 July 2019. By July 2022, the couple had separated, Goldrath filed for divorce in December 2022 and the divorce was finalized in June 2023. McKidd has been in a relationship with Station 19 actress Danielle Savre since 2023.

In April 2013 McKidd was Grand Marshal of the 15th annual Tartan Day Parade in New York City. At the time, he voiced his support for Scottish independence and expressed regret that he would be unable to vote in the then upcoming Scottish independence referendum the following year because he no longer lives in Scotland. Of Scottish independence, McKidd stated, "A lot of people think we're all gonna fall flat on our face if we do this. We're too feisty a people to let things turn bad if we went and tried it. Why not? Why not try at least?"

== Filmography ==
=== Film ===
Year	Title	Role	Notes
1996	Small Faces	Malky Johnson	
1996	Trainspotting	Tommy Mackenzie	
1997	Regeneration	Callan	
1998	Hideous Kinky	Henning	
1998	Bedrooms and Hallways	Leo	
1998	The Acid House	Johnny	International Fantasy Film Award - Best Actor
1998	Dad Savage	H	
1998	Looking After Jo Jo	Basil	
1999	Topsy-Turvy	Durward Lely	
1999	Understanding Jane	Eliott	
2002	Nicholas Nickleby	John Browdie	
2002	Max	George Grosz	
2002	Dog Soldiers	Pte Lawrence Cooper	
2002	That Old One	Tom Furness	Short film
2003	The Key	Duncan	
2003	AfterLife	Kenny Brogan	
2003	16 Years of Alcohol	Frankie	BAFTA Scotland - Best Actor in a Scottish Film - Nominated; British Independent Film Award Best Actor - Nominated
2004	Does God Play Football	Father Davis	Short film
2004	De-Lovely	Bobby Reed	
2004	The Purifiers	Moses	
2004	One Last Chance	Seany	
2005	Kingdom of Heaven	English Sergeant	
2006	The Rocket Post	Thomas McKinnon	
2007	The Last Legion	Wulfila	
2007	Hannibal Rising	Kolnas	
2008	Made of Honor	Colin McMurray	
2010	One Night in Emergency	Peter Forbes	
2010	Percy Jackson & the Olympians: The Lightning Thief	Poseidon	
2010	Bunraku	Killer #2	
2011	The Great Ghost Rescue	Hamish	
2012	Comes A Bright Day	Cameron	
2012	Brave	Lord MacGuffin, Young MacGuffin (voice)	
2013	Justice League: The Flashpoint Paradox	Thomas Wayne / Batman (voice)	Direct-to-video
2015	Home Sweet Hell	Freeman	
2017	T2 Trainspotting	Tommy Mackenzie	Archive footage from Trainspotting
2017	Tulip Fever	Johan De Bye	
2024	It Ends With Us	Andrew Bloom	
TBA	Highlander	TBA	Filming

=== Television ===
Year	Title	Role	Notes
1996	Father Ted	Father Deegan	Episode: "A Christmassy Ted"
1996	Kavanagh QC	David Lomax	Episode: "A Stranger in the Family"
1997	Richard II	Henry Percy	TV film
1999	The Magical Legend of the Leprechauns	Jericho O'Grady	2 episodes
2000	Anna Karenina	Count Vronsky	4 episodes
2000	North Square	Billy Guthrie	10 episodes
2004	Gunpowder, Treason & Plot	James Hepburn, 4th Earl of Bothwell	Biarritz International Festival of Audiovisual Programming - Best Actor
2005	The Virgin Queen	Duke of Norfolk	2 episodes
2005–2007	Rome	Lucius Vorenus	22 episodes
2007	Journeyman	Dan Vasser	13 episodes Nominated - Saturn Award for Best Actor on Television
2008–2026	Grey's Anatomy	Dr. Owen Hunt	Main cast; frequent director (Season 5–Season 22); 365 episodes Prism Award - Best Performance in a Drama Series Multi-Episode Storyline; Prism Award - Best Performance in a Drama Series Episode - Nominated (2011)
2014	Toy Story That Time Forgot	Reptillus Maximus (voice)	Television special
2014	Franklin & Bash	Duke Albert Daughtery	Episode: "Dance the Night Away"
2016–2017	Star Wars Rebels	Fenn Rau (voice)	7 episodes
2018	Welcome to the Wayne	General Ia'cthar (voice)	Episode: "So This is Glamsterdam"
2019	Mike Tyson Mysteries	Ian Douglas (voice)	Episode: "Pits and Peaks"
2020	Station 19	Dr. Owen Hunt	3 episodes
2020	Room 104	Kyran - The Last Man	Episode: "The Last Man"
2023	Six Four	Chris O'Neill	4 episodes
2025	The Bombing of Pan Am 103	DCS Tom McCulloch	1 Episode

=== Video games ===
Year	Title	Role	Notes
2002	Grand Theft Auto: Vice City	Jezz Torrent	
2009	Call of Duty: Modern Warfare 2	Captain John "Soap" MacTavish	
2011	Call of Duty: Modern Warfare 3	Captain John "Soap" MacTavish	

== Director ==
Year	Title	Episode
2010	Grey's Anatomy Seattle Grace: Message of Hope (Webisodes)	"No Comment" (14 October 2010) "Take One" (21 October 2010) "Award-Winning" (11 November 2010) "The Sizzle" (18 November 2010)
2011–present	Grey's Anatomy	1: "Don't Deceive Me (Please Don't Go)" (2011); 2: "Poker Face" (2011); 3: "Let the Bad Times Roll" (2012); 4: "I Saw Her Standing There" (2012); 5: "Do You Believe in Magic?" (2013); 6: "Two Against One" (2013); 7: "I'm Winning" (2014); 8: "I Must Have Lost it on the Wind" (2014); 9: "Time Stops" (2015); 10: "Sledgehammer" (2015); 11: "Odd Man Out" (2016); 12: "Mama Tried" (2016); 13: "Catastrophe and the Cure" (2016); 14: "Who Is He (And What Is He To You)?" (2017); 15: "Till I Hear It From You" (2017); 16: "True Colors" (2017); 17: "Get Off on The Pain" (2017); 18: "Out of Nowhere" (2017); 19: "One Day Like This" (2018); 20: "Bad Reputation" (2018); 21: "Broken Together" (2018); 22: "Blowin' In The Wind" (2018); 23: "I Walk The Line" (2019); 24: "Drawn to the Blood" (2019); 25: "Back in the Saddle" (2019); 26: "Let's All Go to the Bar" (2019); 27: "Give a Little Bit" (2020); 28: "My Happy Ending" (2020); 29: "In My Life" (2021); 30: "Tradition" (2021); 31: "Someone Saved My Life Tonight" (2021); 32: "Some Kind of Tomorrow" (2021); 33: "Legacy" (2022); 34: "Put It to the Test" (2022); 35: "Out for Blood" (2022); 36: "Let's Talk About Sex" (2022); 37: "Love Don't Cost a Thing" (2023); 38: "Pick Yourself Up" (2023); 39: "Wedding Bell Blues" (2023); 40: "We've Only Just Begun" (2024); 41: "I Carry Your Heart" (2024); 42: "Take Me to Church" (2024); 43: "Drop It Like It's Hot" (2024); 44: "Ridin' Solo" (2025); 45: "Love You Like a Love Song" (2025); 46: "We Built This City" (2025); 47: "Strip That Down" (2026); 48: "Wrecking Ball" (2026); 49: "Bridge over Troubled Water" (2026); 50:
