= Kim Raver =

American actress (born 1969)

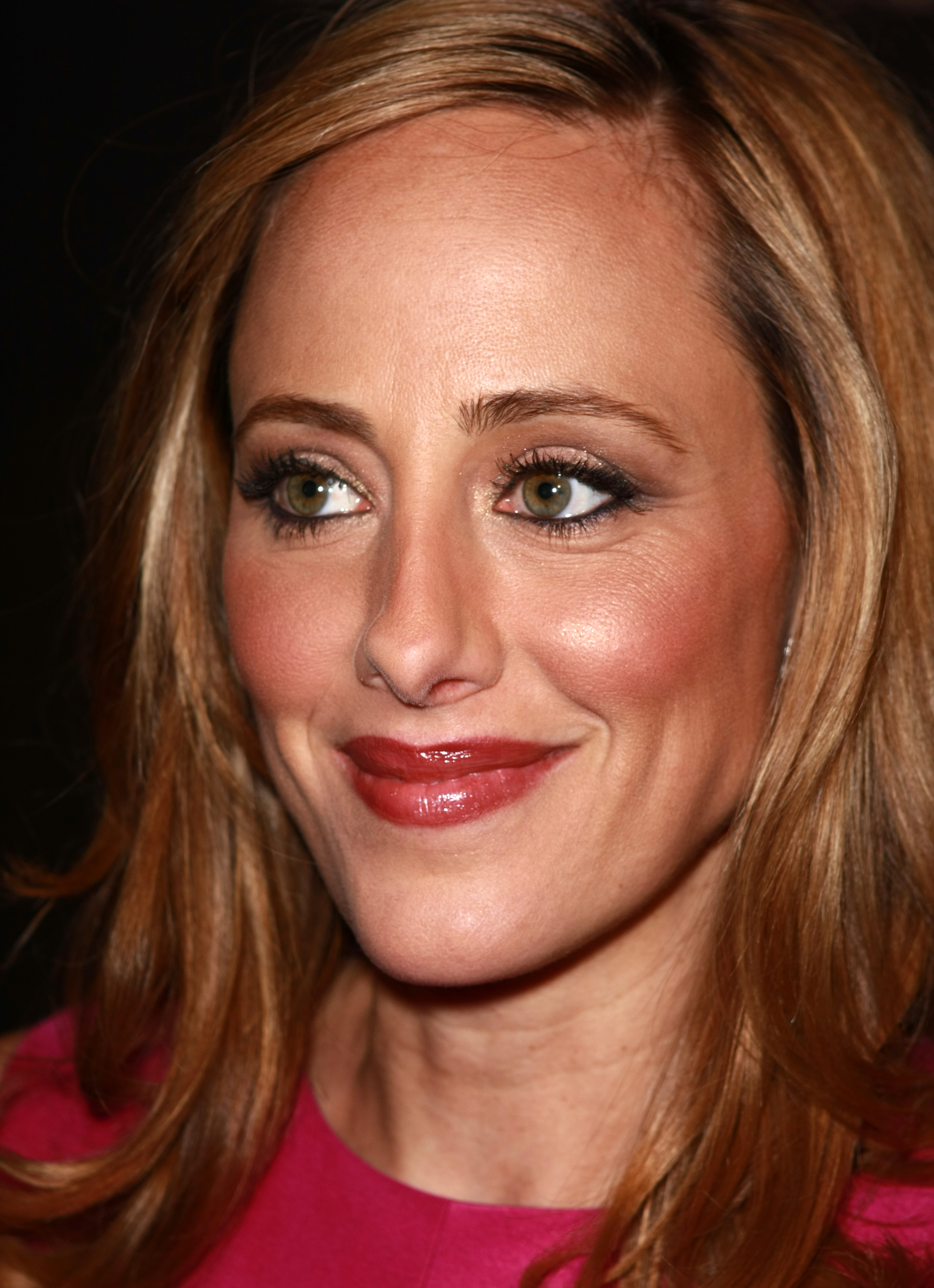
- Raver in 2010
- Born: Kimberly Jayne Raver; March 15, 1969 (age 57); New York City, U.S.
- Education: Boston University
- Occupation: Actress
- Years active: 1975–1978, 1993–present
- Spouse: Manuel Boyer (m. 2000)
- Children: 2
- Relatives: C. Cybele Raver (sister)

Kimberly Jayne Raver (born March 15, 1969) is an American actress. She is best known for her portrayal of cardiothoracic surgeon Dr. Teddy Altman on the ABC medical drama Grey's Anatomy (2009–2012; 2017–2026), Kim Zambrano on Third Watch (1999–2005), and Audrey Raines on 24 (2005–2007).

== Early life ==
Raver was born and raised in New York City by her mother. She attended Boston University, where she earned a Bachelor of Fine Arts degree in drama.

== Career ==
=== Initial career (1974–2008) ===
Raver got her start as a child star in 1975 appearing on Sesame Street at age 6. She remained on the show for three years. She initially acted in commercials for Visa and Jeep when her adult career began. Her first prominent role was her Broadway debut in 1995 in the Philip Barry play "Holiday" in which she co-starred with Laura Linney and Tony Goldwyn. She also appeared in the feature film City Hall with Al Pacino. She also co-starred with John Spencer and David Schwimmer in "The Glimmer Brothers," a production of the Williamstown Theatre Festival, written by Warren Leight. After her time on Third Watch, she was cast as Audrey Raines in the television series 24, and was a series regular for two seasons.

During the fall 2006 television season, Raver starred in the ABC television series The Nine. Although the show received outstanding critical reviews, it did not take off in the Nielsen ratings and was cancelled. She reprised her role in 24's season 6 as Audrey Raines. The character was in a catatonic state at the end of the season.

Raver starred as Nico Reilly, the editor-in-chief of Bonfire magazine, in NBC's television drama series Lipstick Jungle. The show was adapted from the Candace Bushnell novel and ran for 20 episodes from February 2008 – January 2009.

=== Stardom with Grey's Anatomy (2009–2012) ===
Raver joined Season 6 of Grey's Anatomy in a recurring role as Dr. Teddy Altman, a cardiothoracic surgeon brought in by Dr. Owen Hunt, who served with her in Iraq. She made her on-screen debut on November 12. It was announced on January 4, 2010, that Raver had become a series regular on the show. On May 18, 2012, Grey's Anatomy creator, Shonda Rhimes, announced that Raver had decided to leave Grey's Anatomy after three seasons, "I know this season's finale had some surprises for viewers and the exit of Kim Raver was one of the big ones. But Kim's series option was up and she was ready to give Teddy Altman a much-needed vacation. It's been a pleasure working with someone as talented and funny and kind as Kim; everyone is going to miss her terribly. I like to imagine that Teddy is still out there in the Grey's Anatomy universe, running Army Medical Command and building a new life." When the news of her departure was released, Raver wrote on her Twitter, "I've had one of the best times of my creative career working on Grey's with Shonda, Betsy and the best cast on Television," she wrote, adding: "I feel fortunate and grateful to have worked with such an amazing team at [Grey's Anatomy]. [I] am going to miss everyone!! And to the [Grey's Anatomy] fans, you guys rock! I am sure [season nine] will be great!

=== Later career (2013–present) ===
Additionally, Raver studied theater in New York with teacher and mentor Wynn Handman.

In 2014, Raver returned to the role of Audrey Boudreau (née Heller, then married and known as Raines) for the twelve-episode 24: Live Another Day. In 2015, she had a guest appearance on the eleventh-season premiere of Bones.

In 2017, Raver recurred on the fifth season of Ray Donovan and also returned as Dr. Teddy Altman on Grey's Anatomy for its 14th season. In the same year, Raver was cast in the recurring role of Dr. Andrea Frost on the second season of the ABC political drama Designated Survivor. In May 2018, it was announced that she would once again become a series regular on Grey's Anatomy, beginning with its 15th season. In March 2026, it was announced that Raver will depart the series after the season 22 finale along with her co-star Kevin McKidd.

== Personal life ==
Raver has been married to director and writer Manuel Boyer since 2000. They have two sons.

== Filmography ==
=== Film ===
Year	Title	Role	Notes
2002	Martin & Orloff	Kashia	
2004	Mind the Gap	Vicki Walters	
2005	Keep Your Distance	Susan Dailey	
2005	Haunting Sarah	Erica Rose Lewis / Heather Rose Lord	
2006	Night at the Museum	Erica Daley	
2007	Prisoner	Renee	
2018	Marvel Rising: Secret Warriors	Captain Marvel	Voice role
2023	The Braid	Sarah	

=== Television ===
Year	Title	Role	Notes
1975–1978	Sesame Street	Kim	TV series
1994	Menendez: A Killing in Beverly Hills	Linda	TV film
1995	C.P.W.	Deanne Landers	Episodes: "Stephanie and the Wolves", "Chess Moves", "The Best, False Friend"
1996	Law & Order	Wendy Karmel	Episode: "Homesick"
1997	The Practice	Victoria Keenan	Episode: "Reasonable Doubts"
1997	Spin City	Jeannie	Episode: "My Life is a Soap Opera"
1997	Soul Mates	Joanna Kincade	TV film
1998	Trinity	Clarissa McCallister	Episodes: "Pilot", "In a Yellow Wood", "No Secrets"
1999–2005	Third Watch	Kim Zambrano	Main role (season 1–5); recurring (season 6), 11 episodes
2002	ER	Kim Zambrano	Episode: "Brothers and Sisters"
2005–2007	24	Audrey Raines	Main role (season 4–5); recurring (season 6), 52 episodes
2006–2007	The Nine	Kathryn Hale	13 episodes
2008–2009	Lipstick Jungle	Nico Reilly	20 episodes
2009	Inside the Box	Samantha Hathaway	TV pilot
2009–2012, 2017–2026	Grey's Anatomy	Dr. Teddy Altman	Main cast (seasons 6–8, 15–22); recurring (season 14), 215 episodes Director: 3 episodes
2010	Bond of Silence	Katy McIntosh	TV film
2012	The Secret Lives of Wives	Michelle	TV film
2012–2014	Revolution	Julia Neville	9 episodes
2013	NCIS: Los Angeles	Paris Summerskill	Episodes: "Red: Part 1 & 2"
2014	24: Live Another Day	Audrey Boudreau-Heller / Audrey Raines	12 episodes
2015	Bones	Grace Miller	Guest role; 2 episodes
2015	The Advocate	Frankie Reese	TV pilot
2015	Full Circle	Madeline Faulkner	Main role (season 3), 10 episodes
2016	Zoobiquity	Julia Fisher	TV film
2017	APB	Lauren Fitch	3 episodes
2017	Ray Donovan	Bergstein	4 episodes
2018	Designated Survivor	Andrea Frost	Season 2, 6 episodes
2019	Marvel Rising: Heart of Iron	Captain Marvel	Voice
2020–2023	Station 19	Dr. Teddy Altman	Guest role (seasons 3, 5–6), 4 episodes
