= Characters of Ackley Bridge =

Core characters of series five.

Ackley Bridge is a British television drama series that follows the lives of the staff and pupils at the fictional multi-cultural academy school Ackley Bridge College. Series one features the debuts of friends Missy Booth (Poppy Lee Friar) and Nasreen Paracha (Amy-Leigh Hickman), headteacher Mandy Carter (Jo Joyner) and her husband Steve Bell (Paul Nicholls), school cook Kaneez Paracha (Sunetra Sarker), English teacher Emma Keane (Liz White) and her daughter Chloe Voyle (Fern Deacon), school sponsor Sadiq Nawaz (Adil Ray) and his children Alya (Maariah Hussain) and Riz (Nohail Mohammed), brothers Jordan (Samuel Bottomley) and Cory Wilson (Sam Retford), school receptionist Lorraine Bird (Lorraine Cheshire), science teacher Lila Shariff (Anneika Rose), head of pastoral care Samir Qureshi (Arsher Ali), PE teacher Will Simpson (Tom Varey), Missy's mother Simone (Samantha Power) and grandmother Julie 'Nana' Booth (Rita May) and students Hayley Booth (Cody Ryan), Razia (Nazmeen Kauser) and Saleem Paracha (Esa Ashraf), Candice Murgatroyd (Emily Pyzer) and Naveed Haider (Gurjeet Singh). Series two sees the introduction of science teacher Rashid Hyatt (Tony Jayawardena), Nasreen's half-brother Aaron Turner (Adam Fielding), deputy headteacher Javid Shah (Jay Saighal) and student Sam Murgatroyd (Megan Parkinson).

Series three features the arrivals of Valley Trust transfer teachers Martin Evershed (Rob James-Collier) and Sue Carp (Charlie Hardwick), temporary headteacher Sian Oakes (Ty Glaser), PE teacher Hassan Hussein (Hareet Deol) and students Pawel Nowicki (Szymon Kantor), Rukhsana Ibrahim (Phoebe Tuffs-Berry), Younis Iqbal (Abdul Ahadbutt) and Kacey 'Spud' Gartside (Zara Salim). The fourth series saw a cast overhaul, with the arrivals of Kayla Azfal (Robyn Cara) and her half-sister Marina (Carla Woodcock), Kayla's best friend Fizza Akhtar (Yasmin Al-Khudhairi), travellers Johnny (Ryan Dean) and Queenie Cooper (Jasmine Payne) and Rose Boswell (Olivia Marie Fearn), Kaneez's nephew Tahir Randhawa (Shobit Piasa) and Rashid's mother Zainab (Leena Dhingra). Series five saw the introduction of Marina's younger brother Kyle (Adam Little), as well as teacher Asma Farooqi (Laila Zaidi).

== Overview ==
Character	Portrayed by	Series				
Character	Portrayed by	1	2	3	4	5
Missy Booth	Poppy Lee Friar	Main	Main	Main		
Nasreen Paracha	Amy-Leigh Hickman	Main	Main	Main		
Mandy Carter	Jo Joyner	Main	Main	Main	Main	
Kaneez Paracha	Sunetra Sarker	Main	Main	Main	Main	Main
Razia Paracha	Nazmeen Kauser	Main	Main	Main	Main	Main
Hayley Booth	Cody Ryan	Main	Main	Main	Main	Main
Saleem Paracha	Esa Ashraf	Main				
Saleem Paracha	Yaseen Khan		Recurring	Main		
Saleem Paracha	Yousef Naseer				Main	Main
Jordan Wilson	Samuel Bottomley	Main	Main			
Steve Bell	Paul Nicholls	Main	Main			
Sadiq Nawaz	Adil Ray	Main	Main	Main		
Emma Keane	Liz White	Main	Main	Guest (Note: In series three, White is credited as part of the main cast but only appears in 1 episode.)		
Will Simpson	Tom Varey	Main	Main			
Alya Nawaz	Maariah Hussain	Main	Main	Main		
Samir Qureshi	Arsher Ali	Main	Main			
Lorraine Bird	Lorraine Cheshire	Main	Main	Main	Main	Main
Cory Wilson	Sam Retford	Main	Main	Main		
Riz Nawaz	Nohail Mohammed	Main	Main	Main		
Chloe Voyle	Fern Deacon	Main	Main	Main	Main	Main
Lila Shariff	Anneika Rose	Main				
Simone Booth	Samantha Power	Main	Main	Main	Main	
Candice Murgatroyd	Emily Pyzer	Recurring	Main	Main	Main	
Naveed Haider	Gurjeet Singh	Guest	Main	Main		
Rashid Hyatt	Tony Jayawardena		Main	Main	Main	Main
Aaron Turner	Adam Fielding		Main			
Javid Shah	Jay Saighal		Main			
Sam Murgatroyd	Megan Parkinson		Main	Main	Main	
Martin Evershed	Rob James-Collier			Main	Main	Main
Sue Carp	Charlie Hardwick			Main	Main	Main
Pawel Nowicki	Szymon Kantor			Main	Main	
Rukhsana Ibrahim	Phoebe Tuffs-Berry			Main	Main	Main
Younis Iqbal	Abdul Ahadbutt			Main	Main	Main
Kacey 'Spud' Gartside	Zara Salim			Main	Main	Main
Hassan Hussein	Hareet Deol			Main	Main	Main
Sian Oakes	Ty Glaser			Main		
Kayla Azfal	Robyn Cara				Main	Main
Marina Dobson	Carla Woodcock				Main	
Marina Dobson	Megan Morgan					Main
Fizza Akhtar	Yasmin Al-Khudhairi				Main	Main
Johnny Cooper	Ryan Dean				Main	Main
Queenie Cooper	Jasmine Payne				Main	Main
Tahir Randhawa	Shobhit Piasa				Main	
Rose Boswell	Olivia Marie Fearn				Main	Guest
Zainab Hyatt	Leena Dhingra				Main	
Kyle Dobson	Adam Little					Main
Asma Farooqi	Laila Zaidi					Main

== Main characters ==
=== Missy Booth ===
Missy Booth (portrayed by Poppy Lee Friar) is the older sister of Hayley (Cody Ryan), and the daughter of Simone (Samantha Power). She is also the lifelong best friend of Nasreen Paracha (Amy-Leigh Hickman). The pair start at Ackley Bridge College, having previously attended different schools. Due to Missy retaking a year, she is placed in the year group below Nasreen. Missy's grandmother Julie (Rita May) worries about her money being stolen. Missy suspects that her mother stole the money, and enlists Nasreen's help to find her. Before going to school, Missy goes upstairs to help Julie get out of the bath, but is distraught to find her dead in the bath. Unsure on what to do, she leaves her body, and goes to school. She later confides in Nasreen, but tells her to keep it a secret, as there is no longer a legal guardian to look after Hayley. Teacher Emma Keane (Liz White) finds out, and reports Julie's death to the social board, who puts Hayley into foster care. With the help of Simone, Missy manages to regain custody of Hayley. Missy begins a relationship with Nasreen's half-brother, Aaron Turner (Adam Fielding). When he surprises her with a firework display, which accidentally destroys his car, she proposes to him. She later becomes pregnant with his baby and tells Aaron, who is delighted. However, feeling it is too soon to have a child, she has an abortion. Aaron finds out, and angry that Missy did not consult him, he ends the relationship. Missy starts at sixth form with Nasreen, who is planning to go to Oxford University. She accompanies Nasreen to Oxford to attend her interview, reassuring her that she would make a good doctor. When they return home, Missy confides in Nasreen that she plans to leave school again to join the local fair. Nasreen laughs, and accuses Missy of "throwing her life away" like her mother. The pair make up with each other, and while walking home, they are hit by a speeding car driven by Anwar Wazir (Antonio Aakeel). Missy has two broken arms, but when she goes to bed, she is shocked to see her dead grandmother, who informs her that she has died. Nasreen visits Missy, and is distraught to find her dead body.

In an interview with Channel 4, actress Friar described Missy as a "survivor", and the "glue of her family", however, noted that "she's also got a rebellious side, she can be quite tough and opinionated which can get her into trouble as her emotions can often present themselves in funny ways and bubble over. She can rub people up the wrong way as her mouth can run away from her". Friar also commented: "she's very popular at school, especially with the boys who love her as she's quite saucy and sassy, but they know they could only dream that she would be interested in them. She's very street wise and she's constantly self-sacrificing because she's had to be Mum, Dad and carer all at the same time. She's had so much responsibility, but she does it out of love as she's very loyal to her friends and family and her best friend Nas. They've grown up together and their families are entwined, there's zero prejudice of culture and colour between them."

Friar's performance throughout series one was praised by Daljinder Johal of Desiblitz, who described it as "powerful". Rianne Houghton of Digital Spy praised Friar for her performance during the teenage pregnancy storyline in series two, as well as the portrayal of "supportive female friendships". She also praised the "realistic and balanced portrayal of teen pregnancy and abortion". After Missy's death, Paul Fogarty of HITC stated that "Ackley Bridge will never be the same again", and Filiz Mehmedova of Digital Spy stated that they were not "emotionally ready" for her death. Viewers of the programme expressed their upset and outrage with Missy's death, with Digital Spy noting that viewers complained about the "shocking twist". Becky Freeth of Metro described the scenes as a "gut-wrenching plot twist" that "caught many off-guard", and noted that viewers expected Missy to survive the car accident. Despite the negative reactions to Missy's death, many viewers praised the storyline for the ways in which her death was dealt with by other characters, such as Nasreen's anger and students setting off lanterns for her, the latter of which was described as "one of the most powerful Ackley Bridge scenes of all time".

=== Nasreen Paracha ===
Nasreen Paracha (portrayed by Amy-Leigh Hickman) is the older sister of Razia (Nazmeen Kauser) and Saleem (Esa Ashraf/Yaseen Khan), and the daughter of Kaneez (Sunetra Sarker) and Iqbal (Narinda Samra). Nasreen comes out to lifelong best friend Missy Booth (Poppy Lee Friar) as a lesbian. She then kisses her teacher, Lila Shariff (Anneika Rose), while on a night out with Missy. After coming out to Kaneez, she engages in a fake arranged marriage with Naveed Haider (Gurjeet Singh), who is also secretly gay. She later meets Sam Murgatroyd (Megan Parkinson), who attends an anti-Muslim march in the local area. Despite Sam and her family's views, the pair begin a relationship. Nasreen later ends their relationship when she is disillusioned with who Sam is. Missy starts at sixth form with Nasreen, who is planning to go to Oxford University. She accompanies Nasreen to Oxford to attend her interview, and when they return home, Missy confides in Nasreen that she plans to leave school again to join the local fair. Nasreen laughs, and accuses Missy of "throwing her life away" like her mother. The pair eventually make up with each other, and while walking home, they are hit by a speeding car driven by Anwar Wazir (Antonio Aakeel). Although injured, they are believed to be fine. However, Nasreen then finds Missy's dead body, after she died from an internal bleed. Nasreen is informed by headteacher Mandy Carter (Jo Joyner) that she will be accepted into Oxford if she achieves the necessary grades, but in haste, she quits school and decides to work at a tea towel factory. Kaneez persuades her to go back to school, but she does not perform well in her A Level exams. Kaneez then drives to Oxford, and persuades the acceptance board to allow her to attend the university.

On her character, actress Hickman stated that "Nas is very determined in everything she tries to do and that's a quality I really like about her. It's like she's gone, 'do you know what? Screw it. I'm going to do this for me'". She described Nasreen's relationship with Missy as a "lovely friendship", and stated that the onscreen spark is owed to her friendship with Friar in real life, adding that they make each other laugh between takes. Hickman has talked about the impact that Nasreen being a lesbian Muslim has had, such as Asian girls tweeting her or approaching her in real life to thank her for the storyline. She described the story as "not just doing a job you love", but "something for the greater good". Hickman stated that she "a sense of pressure but not in a bad way" in portraying Nasreen, due to the "responsibility" she feels due to how "important it is". In 2019, it was announced that she would be departing from the cast of Ackley Bridge after the third series, with Hickman taking on a role in the BBC drama series Our Girl. Hickman missed the physical training requires for Our Girl in order to finish her tenure on Ackley Bridge, commenting: "I was on the phone a lot to the military advisor, and he was letting me know what everyone was doing every day".

Nasreen was listed as one of Autostraddle's Favourite Lesbian, Bisexual and Trans TV Characters of 2019, and was described as "groundbreaking". It was noted that representation of Muslims on primetime television is rare, and that "to have a young queer Muslim woman as, essentially, the lead character in an ensemble show" was something to be praised. For her role as Nasreen, Hickman was awarded the Actor award at the 2020 RTS Yorkshire Awards.

=== Mandy Carter ===
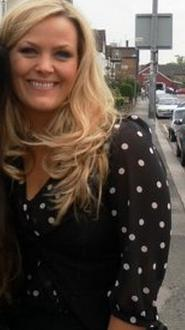
Jo Joyner portrays Mandy Carter.

Mandy Carter (portrayed by Jo Joyner) is the headteacher of Ackley Bridge College. Mandy is married to PE teacher Steve Bell (Paul Nicholls), who previously had an affair with basketball teacher Claire Butterworth (Kimberley Walsh). While struggling with the challenges of the new school, Mandy has sex with school sponsor Sadiq Nawaz (Adil Ray), who is the father of students Alya (Maariah Hussain) and Riz (Nohail Mohammed). She tells Steve, who is initially angry with Mandy, but later forgives her and reconciles their marriage. Mandy later discovers that she is pregnant, and that Steve is the father of the child. Steve proposes that they get back together to support the child, but Mandy states that they do not work well as a couple. In series two, a drunk man is found in the toilets of the school, and Mandy affirms that she will handle the situation. The man is revealed to be her abusive father Ray (Ted Robbins), who is claiming to have dementia. She offers to use her savings to put Ray in a residential care home, in order to give her mother Dianne (Lin Blakley) a more peaceful life. Mandy explains to best friend Emma Keane (Liz White) that her dream as a child was to get a successful job, and save her mother from Ray. Mandy later learns that her parents were lying to her in order to use her money for a camper van to go travelling in.

Upon her casting, actress Joyner described her character Mandy as "hard working", and stated that prior to the pilot episode, Mandy has "dedicated the last few years to getting this school off the ground". She explained that in order to have a successful work career, Mandy has "neglected other areas of her life, like having fun and her husband". She added that Mandy is "a perfectionist and relishes the chance to do something great for the community and truly believes in the opportunities that good education can bring". Joyner went on to note the contradiction between Mandy's personal and professional life, stating that she is "strong and capable when it comes to leadership and work", but her personal life is the "complete opposite". Joyner stated that she loves the contradiction in Mandy's personality, since it makes her a "fully rounded" character, and added that the contradiction is "seen in a lot of great women".

Joyner appeared on the ITV talk show Lorraine to discuss her part in the series, where she explained that viewers would tell her "everyday" how much they liked and admired her character. She noted that the messages were from people of all ages, which she appreciated. Mandy was described as being "the most caring teacher ever" by Stephanie Chase of Digital Spy, with viewers adding that she is the "best teacher" on the series.

=== Kaneez Paracha ===
Kaneez Paracha (portrayed by Sunetra Sarker) is the mother of Nasreen (Amy-Leigh Hickman), Razia (Nazmeen Kauser) and Saleem (Esa Ashraf/Yaseen Khan), and the separated wife of Iqbal (Narinda Samra). She is also a school cook at Ackley Bridge College. Kaneez learns that Iqbal is attempting to have Nasreen enter an arranged marriage, which Kaneez disagrees with due to being forced to quit school as a teenager to marry Iqbal. When Nasreen refuses to marry and comes out to Kaneez as a lesbian, she is initially disgusted with her. However, after Nasreen's best friend Missy Booth (Poppy Lee Friar) talks to her about Nasreen's struggles, Kaneez takes it upon herself to understand Nasreen and her sexuality. Science teacher Rashid Hyatt (Tony Jayawardena) informs Kaneez that Razia has dyspraxia, and despite her initial disagreement and anger at Rashid, she accepts that he is right. She then goes on a date with him, and the pair begin a relationship. After headteacher Mandy Carter (Jo Joyner) sees how well Kaneez deals with students, she persuades Kaneez to apply for the job of student support officer, which she gets.

Upon the cast announcements for Ackley Bridge, Kaneez was billed as a "force of nature" who is "full of personality and opinions". It was stated that as part of her backstory, she arrived in England at the age of 16 and became "a prominent voice in the community, raising her family practically single-handedly while her husband Iqbal is away". Actress Sarker added that due to her experiences with moving to England as a teenager has made her "a real example of self-learning and independence" due to "finding her feet with the language and life skills". On accepting the role of Kaneez, Sarker stated that it was "just so rare to find a character that had been written as a three-dimensional Asian woman", and noted that it was even rarer for her to be a northern Asian woman. She complimented the writing for her character, praising the script for its "humour, pathos, drama, a bit of everything", adding that she knew from the first time reading it that she would enjoy portraying Kaneez. Sarker noted that due to the character being "so far away" from any of the other characters she had played, she suspected that people would think she could not portray the character accurately, even stating that she doubted her own capabilities.

Shout Out UK described Kaneez as a "matriarch", stating that they were glad to continue seeing her after three series. Viewers have a positive of opinion of Kaneez's humorous nature, with her being described as an "icon" and a "queen of comedy". Dan Seddon of Digital Spy wrote that her scenes have "comic ingenuity", that himself and viewers are "blown away by Kaneez's knee-slapping antics", and joked that a statue of her should be placed at the fictional school. At the 2019 Asian Media Awards, Kaneez was nominated for, and eventually won, the award for Best TV Character.

=== Razia Paracha ===
Razia Paracha (portrayed by Nazmeen Kauser) is the sister of Nasreen (Amy-Leigh Hickman) and Saleem (Esa Ashraf/Yaseen Khan), and the daughter of Kaneez (Sunetra Sarker) and Iqbal (Narinda Samra). Razia develops a crush on Riz Nawaz (Nohail Mohammed), but he decides to date her best friend Hayley Booth (Cody Ryan) instead. She becomes convinced that he likes her since she is white, and bleaches her skin in an attempt to appear white. When her science teacher, Rashid Hyatt (Tony Jayawardena), sees her struggling in lessons, he makes her aware that she has dyspraxia. Hayley discovers a pregnancy test in Kaneez's bathroom cupboard, and tells Razia that she knows how to fake a positive test.

Razia is billed as "bright, opinionated and keen to learn", with a sometimes "abrasive" personality. She is also described as confident, but it is noted that her confidence is "all a front" while she decides what she wants to do with her life in the future.

=== Hayley Booth ===
Hayley Booth (portrayed by Cody Ryan) is the younger sister of Missy (Poppy Lee Friar), and the daughter of Simone (Samantha Power). After the death of her grandmother Julie (Rita May), she is taken into care. However, Missy manages to get her back, with the help of headteacher Mandy Carter (Jo Joyner). Hayley begins a relationship with Riz Nawaz (Nohail Mohammed). Since her best friend Razia Paracha (Nazmeen Kauser) had a crush on him first, she becomes convinced that Riz likes Hayley because she is white. Razia bleaches her skin in an attempt to appear white, and in turn, Hayley wears a dark shade of foundation to comfort her. Deputy headteacher Javid Shah (Jay Saighal) informs her that she is performing blackface, and reprimands her. Kaneez Paracha (Sunetra Sarker) educates her on the topic, and she apologises. Riz boasts to his classmates that Hayley has performed sexual acts on him; when Missy discovers what he has done, she attempts to get him put on a sex offender registry, since she is under the age of consent. After Missy's death, she feels alone, but Simone steps up to care for her. Kaneez discovers her nephew Tahir Randhawa (Shobhit Piasa) in bed with Hayley and tells him not to mess her around as she is still grieving for Missy. Hayley posts online that they are in a relationship, which he is shocked by. He tells Hayley that his parents have died, which she learns is a lie. Disgusted by his lies about death due to Missy's death, she dumps him. Hayley discovers a pregnancy test in Kaneez's bathroom cupboard, and tells Razia that she knows how to fake a positive test. She tricks Tahir into thinking she is pregnant which makes Kaneez furious due to thinking he is irresponsible. Kaneez later tells her partner Rashid Hyatt (Tony Jayawardena) that she is jealous that Hayley is pregnant and not her. Hayley tells Tahir the pregnancy was a joke.

Both Ryan and Friar received praise from viewers after the episode centred around them dealing with Julie's death aired. Their performances were described as "heartbreaking", with viewers sympathising for their characters.

=== Saleem Paracha ===
Saleem Paracha (portrayed by Esa Ashraf; series 1, Yaseen Khan; series 2–3 and Yousef Naseer; series 4 onwards) is the brother of Nasreen (Amy-Leigh Hickman) and Razia (Nazmeen Kauser), and the son of Kaneez (Sunetra Sarker) and Iqbal (Narinder Samra). Saleem is unaware that Nasreen is a lesbian, until she informs her family that she is in a relationship with Sam Murgatroyd (Megan Parkinson); he accepts Nasreen's sexuality, and wonders if Missy Booth (Poppy Lee Friar) is a lesbian too.

=== Jordan Wilson ===
Jordan Wilson (portrayed by Samuel Bottomley) is the brother of Cory (Sam Retford), and the son of Kevin (Steve Jackson). When he begins attending the school, he pretends to be an Islam revert, and later displays a poster that mocks female students wearing hijabs. This causes a rivalry between Jordan and the Muslim students. He is placed in isolation, where he argues with PE teacher Steve Bell (Paul Nicholls), who punches Jordan. Jordan believes that he is the father of Candice Murgatroyd's (Emily Pyzer) child, and when she leaves the baby with him, Jordan takes him to school in a gym bag. Chloe Voyle (Fern Deacon) discovers the baby, and helps him to escape class to care for it. Jordan shows the baby to Steve, and confides in him that he does not think he is the father. Feeling guilty for punching him, Steve buys him a paternity test for the baby, and it is confirmed that he is not the father; Cory is. In series two, he is abused by his father, and moves out. He begins delivering drugs to fund his lifestyle, and when pastoral care teacher Samir Qureshi (Arsher Ali) discovers what he is doing, he shows Jordan that boxing can be a better source of entertainment for him. Trying to defend Jordan to the drug dealer, Samir is stabbed and dies. Jordan moves back in with Kevin and Cory, but later decides to leave the school and town to attend art college.

Sam Wollaston from The Guardian wrote that Jordan is the best character on Ackley Bridge. He wrote that Jordan is "smart, offensive to everyone, the school wind-up merchant", but noted that he "represents a pessimistic but realistic view that such attempts at integration are futile". Jordan's abuse storyline was described by Radio Times as "heartbreaking", who noted that while viewers were "shocked by the horrific story", they were "impressed by the incredible acting and writing" from Bottomley and Retford. It was stated that the pair have a "bright future" in the acting industry, with a viewer opining that Bottomley deserved a BAFTA award for the scenes.

=== Steve Bell ===
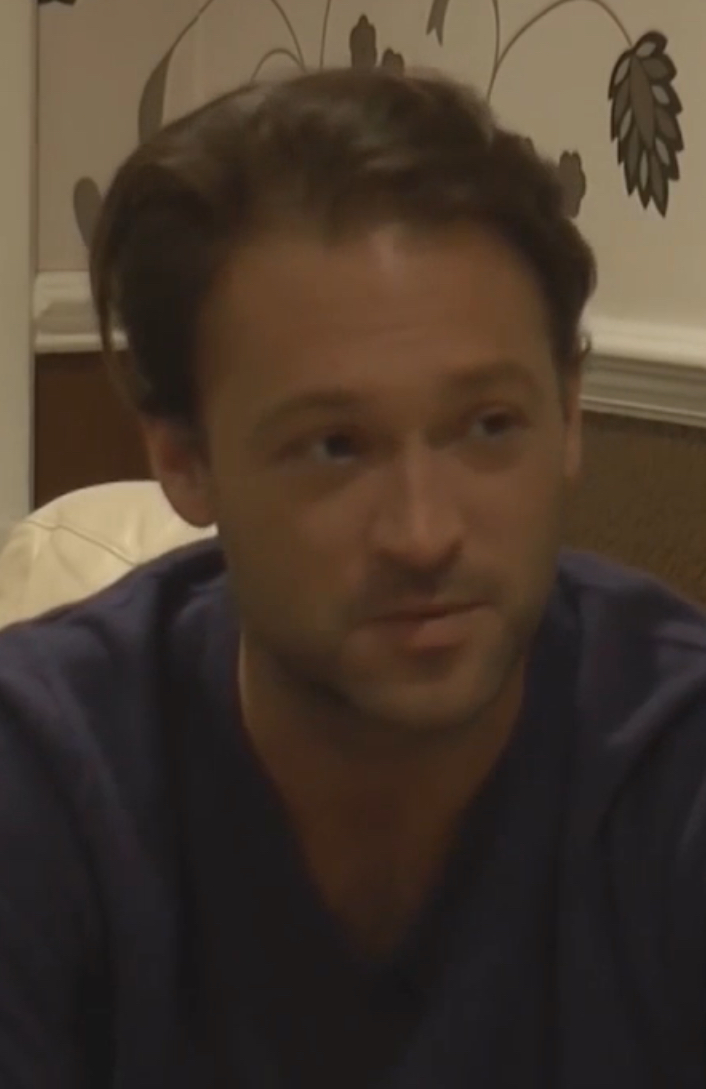
Paul Nicholls portrays Steve Bell.

Steve Bell (portrayed by Paul Nicholls) is the husband of Mandy Carter (Jo Joyner), and a PE teacher at Ackley Bridge College. In the character's backstory, Steve has had an affair with Clair Butterworth (Kimberley Walsh) behind Mandy's back, and the pair have a child together. When Mandy begins working with school sponsor Sadiq Nawaz (Adil Ray), Steve becomes wary that she will have an affair, particularly because of their history. Mandy later reveals that she has had sex with Sadiq, and the pair eventually agree to continue their marriage. When student Cory Wilson (Sam Retford) is nervous about a rugby match against his friend Riz Nawaz (Nohail Mohammed), Steve encourages him by saying "destroy him". Cory accidentally breaks Riz's neck in a tackle, and Steve is blamed for the accident. He is accused of inciting violence, and an investigation is opened to see if he can teach. Mandy tries to stay neutral due to her personal connection due to Steve, and he feels she is being unsupportive. Mandy later informs Steve that she is pregnant with his baby, and he proposes getting back together to support the child. However, Mandy tells him that despite their love for each other, they are too incompatible. Steve is replaced by Hassan Hussein (Hareet Deol) when the Valley Trust take over Ackley Bridge College.

Steve is billed as a "charismatic man's man", and it is noted that he has "a big presence at Ackley Bridge College". He is "well-liked" by both students and teachers, and is "always on hand to break up a fight or settle a discussion". Steve is less of a "career teacher" than Mandy, since he sometimes breaks the rules for the interest of the students. Steve is also "particularly good at working with kids, especially those from challenging backgrounds". Talking about his character, actor Nicholls opined that Steve is "an old school PE teacher" who is "stuck in the 1990s". Nicholls based his portrayal of Steve on his own PE teacher, who he described as a "bit tough". He stated that he "personally wouldn't have him as a friend", and that Steve is not his "cup of tea". He explained that Steve is "a bit rough and ready, a bit of a lad's lad", and very different to him in real life. He stated that he is "still very much a kid himself inside", despite not looking like it. He said that Steve "has a bit of a temper on him", and accredited his actions to having "too many feelings", adding that he is not s "bad guy". Nicholls then touched upon Steve not being a "career teacher". He explains that due to coming from a working-class background, Steve is not concerned with "public image", as he understands certain aspects of the students' lives. He added that Steve can see aspects of himself in certain children. Nicholls stated that this is why Steve became a teacher, and opined that he is "very good" at his job. Nicholls described Steve's relationship with Mandy as "very back and forth" since they have "issues and obstacles to overcome". Despite this, he states that there is love in their relationship, and Steve "likes that she's a strong woman". The pair eventually separate, and Nicholls explained that there will always be "such a physical attraction and an emotional connection between them" that makes them gravitate towards each other. He hinted that the pair could only stay together for a limited amount of time as they struggle to "make it work".

Nicholls was attracted to the role due to the script, which he noted had comedy that made him laugh. Prior to accepting the role, Nicholls had not had a role for two years, and he explained that he sometimes feels he has to take a job purely for the payment. However, he stated this role was different, and that he was "lucky" to come across Ackley Bridge. When Nicholls was taking his nephews to school, he saw his former music teacher, and asked if he could observe a year 11 class, in order to portray a teacher accurately. He stated that he "got a lot out of it". When asked how he finds working with the teenagers on the series, Nicholls stated that he finds it "hilarious", and the experience makes him feel 16 again.

=== Sadiq Nawaz ===
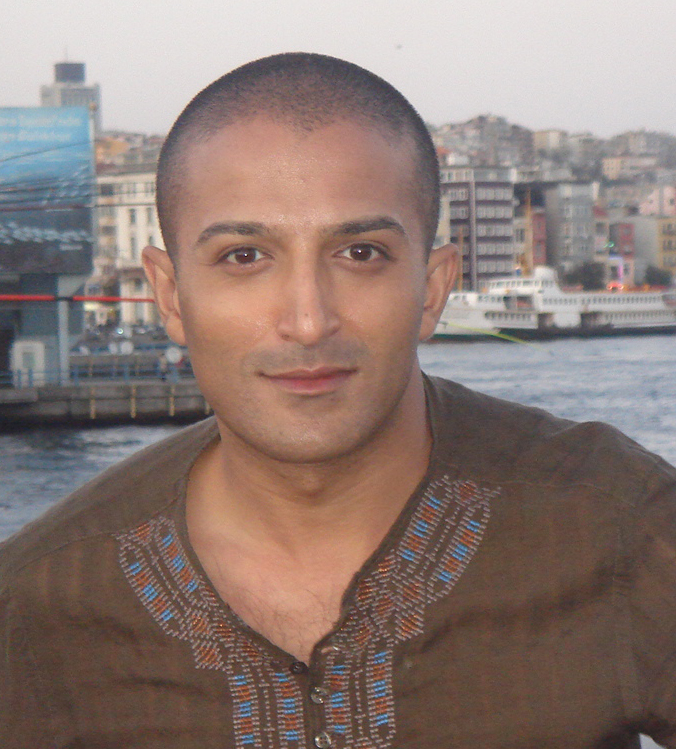
Adil Ray portrays Sadiq Nawaz.

Sadiq Nawaz (portrayed by Adil Ray) is the father of Alya (Maariah Hussain) and Riz (Nohail Mohammed), and the husband of Farida (Anu Hasan). He is introduced as the sponsor of Ackley Bridge College who owns a factory. Sadiq has sex with headteacher Mandy Carter (Jo Joyner), and when Alya discovers this, she exposes him to the entire school. Farida discovers that Sadiq has sold her jewellery in an attempt to save the family from bankruptcy. He loses his factory and family home, and they are forced to move in with Farida's sister. It is later revealed that he is the father of student Kacey 'Spud' Gartside (Zara Salim).

Sadiq "has grafted for everything he's got and is proud of what he's achieved". It is noted that he "appears to be a pillar of the community, but he has an unpleasant side". Sadiq also "enjoys other women's company", and it is stated that Farida knows of his affairs, but "turns a blind eye" as long as it does not become a scandal. Sadiq is a wealthy businessman, who has improved the local area with his ventures. Actor Ray described his character as "a local boy done well", but noted that he is "a man who's used to getting what he wants", referring to both Sadiq's personal and professional life. He opined that Sadiq invests in Ackley Bridge College for both philanthropic and self-serving reasons. He explained the statement, stating that despite being wealthy, Sadiq has "stayed in this relatively small West Yorkshire town" rather than going to a city. Ray believed this is due to having a sense of loyalty to his hometown, but also because he enjoys feeling like "a king in a small castle". He added that although Sadiq has "genuine interest in making the school work, and wanting it to work for the right reasons", he is "materialistic", has "a bit of an ego", and wants to expand his empire as a businessman.

=== Emma Keane ===
Emma Keane (portrayed by Liz White) is the mother of Chloe Voyle (Fern Deacon), and an English teacher at Ackley Bridge College. Emma arrives late to headteacher Mandy Carter's (Jo Joyner) staff meeting, who is a friend from her previous school. She also meets Samir Qureshi (Arsher Ali), with whom she had a relationship with in university. Mandy oversees her English lesson, where daughter Chloe Voyle (Fern Deacon) shows up drunk and vomits in her classroom. Chloe informs her that her father Nik (Stuart Manning) no longer wants to care for her, so she has taken an Uber across the country. When Emma plans for her to go back to Nik and scolds her for getting drunk, Chloe posts a photo of Emma topless on social media. She is called in by Mandy, who informs her that the image has damaged the reputation of the school. Chloe apologises for posting the photo, and Emma explains that she felt she would not be good at motherhood. Emma worries about student Missy Booth (Poppy Lee Friar), who she knows from a previous school. When Missy acts strangely at school, Emma questions her, and Missy asks her for a large sum of money. She explains that her grandmother has died, but asks her not to inform social services, otherwise her sister will put into foster care. Emma affirms that she has a responsibility to tell social services, but waits until they have cremated her grandmother. When the Booth family have a hearing for Hayley's custody, she tries to attend, but Mandy stops her from doing so. Chloe begins to feel neglected by Emma, since she is paying a lot of attention to Missy. She then reveals to Emma that she has a boyfriend, who is in his thirties. Emma goes to her boyfriend's place of work and exposes him for dating a teenager. Emma learns that Samir is engaged to Maryam (Kiran Landa/Meryl Fernandes), but the pair begin an affair regardless. When Samir marries Maryam, they continue their affair. Samir is stabbed, and Emma takes time from work to deal with the grief. She tries to find the man responsible for his death, but is unsuccessful in doing so. When the Valley Trust take over the school, Emma is replaced by Martin Evershed (Rob James-Collier). She returns to the town after hearing Missy has died, to attend a ceremony for her. Mandy begs her to return to the school, but she affirms that she is unsure what to do with her career.

Actress White stated that Emma "wasn't a part that [she would] get picked to play", and thought that nobody would be able to envisage her as Emma. She recalled that when she went in for her audition, she felt "uninhibited" since she did not think she would get the role. She went for the part regardless, since she liked that "really could go anywhere", and that her journey with motherhood is usually unseen on television. She also praised the casting of Deacon, who plays her on-screen daughter Chloe, and felt that the both of them worked well together. Emma is described as "funny, charming and great to be around", as well as "very opinionated". Despite being a figure of authority, it is noted that Emma "has issues with authority". Her backstory includes getting pregnant with Chloe in her first year of university, and therefore delaying her degree to give birth. Chloe's father Dean has had custody of Chloe for the majority of her life, with Emma only seeing her for "one weekend a month and half the school holidays". Despite loving Chloe, she also "loves having her own freedom".

=== Will Simpson ===
Will Simpson (portrayed by Tom Varey) is a PE teacher at Ackley Bridge College. Will shows interest in science teacher Lila Shariff (Anneika Rose) and to makes romantic gestures towards her. She later informs him that she is a lesbian. He then has sex with English teacher Emma Keane (Liz White). Will supports Emma's daughter Chloe Voyle (Fern Deacon), after Jordan Wilson breaks up with her. Alya sees the interaction, and assumes he is grooming her. Alya informs Emma, and she confronts Will. He affirms that his intentions were harmless and to get closer to the pair of them, as he thinks they have a relationship. Emma thanks him for his support, but tells him that she does not want a serious relationship with him.

=== Alya Nawaz ===
Alya Nawaz (portrayed by Maariah Hussain) is the twin sister of Riz (Nohail Mohammed), and the daughter of Sadiq (Adil Ray) and Farida (Anu Hasan). Alya receives romantic attention from Cory Wilson (Sam Retford), and despite having a crush on him, she repeatedly turns him down. Alya is friends with Nasreen Paracha (Amy-Leigh Hickman), until Nasreen begins to spend more time with her best friend Missy Booth (Poppy Lee Friar). Alya begrudges Missy, and disapproves of her lifestyle. She brands her a "gora", and assumes Nasreen is becoming like her. Alya discovers that Sadiq has had sex with headteacher Mandy Carter (Jo Joyner), and exposes her at a school assembly. When rumours spread about Nasreen having sex with Naveed Haider (Gurjeet Singh), Alya judges her, but in turn, Nasreen mocks Sadiq for having an affair. The pair fight, and are sent to isolation. Alya posts a photo of Cory at a food bank, captioning it "#FoodBankSkank", after winning a debate society award for which she praised the work of food banks. She is judged by classmates, but rather than apologising, she has an outburst where she insults both students and teachers. She asks Sadiq if she can transfer to a private school, but he declines. Alya is told by Rukhsana Ibrahim (Phoebe Tuffs-Berry) that Kacey 'Spud' Gartside (Zara Salim) is her half-sister, due to Sadiq being her father. She insults both her father and Spud, but despite her initial disgust, she forgives Sadiq and tells him to show Spud the same love she has received from him. Alya graduates from Ackley Bridge College with all As in every subject, and she is accepted into university.

Alya is billed as a "future head girl" and "a bit of an academic snob". While she is "intelligent", she can also be "judgemental". It is noted that this is a "facade", and that she is "a normal girl with dreams of taking over her father's business one day." Alya "grew up idolising" her father, but following his affair with Mandy, they "haven't had the best relationship".

=== Samir Qureshi ===
Samir Qureshi (portrayed by Arsher Ali) is the community liaison officer at Ackley Bridge College. Samir is engaged to Maryam (Kiran Landa/Meryl Fernandes), but despite this, he begins an affair with English teacher Emma Keane (Liz White). The pair know each other from dating in university, and rekindle their love. Despite having doubts, Samir marries Maryam. When he discovers that former friend Khadim Afzal (Jonas Khan) is forcing student Jordan Wilson (Samuel Bottomley) to deal drugs, he intervenes by getting Jordan into boxing. Samir punches Khadim, and a video of him doing so is posted online. In return for embarrassing him, Khadim stabs him, and leaves him to die in the street.

While Samir "can appear serious", he has "a sharp sense of humour and an easy charm". He is described by the Royal Television Society as "hardworking", and a character that "makes an effort to engage with the pupils he supports". Actor Ali stated that his character "has a real care and respect for his job, as it's helped give him a 'second chance'". He explains that Samir's backstory involves falling in with a bad crowd, which led to him going to prison. Samir also dated Emma in his backstory, and Ali explains that when they encounter each other at Ackley Bridge College, it is a "surprise" for the pair of them. He stated: "a great deal of time has passed since they last met. They've both changed a lot. We explore the rekindling of their strong feelings toward each other and whether or not if it's right or wrong in their current predicaments."

=== Lorraine Bird ===
Lorraine Bird (portrayed by Lorraine Cheshire) is the school receptionist at Ackley Bridge College. Lorraine is described as being "good at her job but a bit of a nosey parker". Cheshire explained that in the second series, viewers will "glimpse a different side to her and another string to her bow". When asked what her favourite aspect of her character is, Cheshire replied that it is her lack of filter. She explained that while Lorraine "says what she thinks", she is also "very loyal" to boss Mandy.

=== Cory Wilson ===
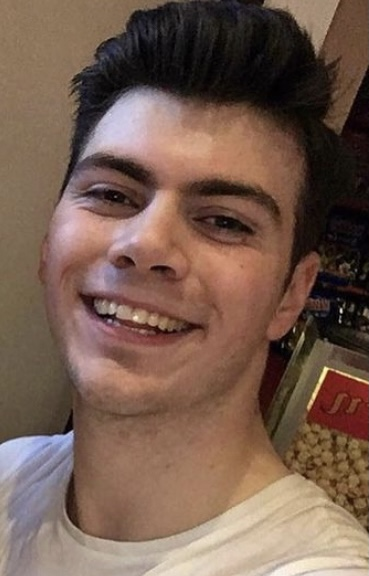
Sam Retford portrays Cory Wilson.

Cory Wilson (portrayed by Sam Retford) is the brother of Jordan (Samuel Bottomley), and the son of Kevin (Steve Jackson). His brother believes that he is the father of Candice Murgatroyd's (Emily Pyzer) child, but she later reveals that she had a one-night stand with Cory, and that he is the father. When Cory watches Kevin physically abuse Jordan, he feels responsible for the abuse. He confides in PE teacher Steve Bell (Paul Nicholls), who assures him that it is not his fault. Cory befriends Naveed Haider (Gurjeet Singh), who he later kisses in the locker room. Whilst playing a rugby match, he is distracted by his feelings and accidentally breaks the neck of friend Riz Nawaz (Nohail Mohammed). Cory then has sex with Naveed, leading him to question his sexuality. Cory is later groomed by the temporary headteacher Sian Oakes (Ty Glaser); due to it disrupting his progress at school, he decides to retake the year.

Retford stated that himself and Bottomley "stayed brothers off-screen" following Jordan's exit from the series. He recalled that they were friends from the first read-through, and praised the casting team for their decision to pair them as brothers. Retford stated that Cory is initially shown to be "the jock of the school", "the popular guy and very promiscuous in his sexual endeavours". However, by the third series, Retford opined that Cory has "grown into himself", and that viewers have seen him to be "a little bit more human now than what he was in series one". Retford also stated that appearing in Ackley Bridge was a "very different" experience for him as an actor, since he had primarily worked on stage before landing the role. He liked that he could see Cory's character growth over the three series of his tenure, describing it as receiving "more pieces to the character's puzzle".

When asked what the most challenging storyline for him to film was, actor Retford stated that it was the domestic abuse scenes. He also wanted both himself and the producers to perfect Cory's sexuality story. He explained that they did not want it to be "the stereotypical story of the jock getting confused with his emotions and then becoming violent". Therefore, they revisited his sexuality arc in the third series. Retford described it as "quite challenging to find a more nuanced way of finding that narrative". He added that a common route would be for the character to question whether he is gay or bisexual, but he instead realises that "he just falls in love with people". An episode that was centred on LGBTQ+ characters to coincide with London Pride aired in July 2018. Digital Spy wrote that "much rejoicing ensued from viewers" when Cory kissed Naveed, and that viewers were "overjoyed" by the development. They later wrote that viewers were "heartbroken" when Cory and Naveed did not end up as a romantic pairing. They also wrote: "fans are adamant that this series cannot end without Cory and Naveed properly getting together". In the third series, an episode that centred on Cory "raised some issues" with viewers. The episode explored the beginning of his relationship with Sian, with Paul Fogarty writing that viewers were "gobsmacked and searching for answers over why the show would introduce such a storyline". He added that the "controversial" affair "caused a stir among the Ackley Bridge fanbase".

=== Riz Nawaz ===
Riz Nawaz (portrayed by Nohail Mohammed) is the twin brother of Alya (Maariah Hussain), and the son of Sadiq (Adil Ray and Farida (Anu Hasan). When Cory Wilson (Sam Retford) asks Riz for his sister's phone number, he gives Cory his own number to protect Alya from him. When Cory finds out he has been flirting with Riz, he is furious and the pair fight. In a rugby match, Cory accidentally breaks Riz's neck. Riz begins a relationship with Hayley Booth (Cody Ryan), but after he boasts about sexual acts she performed on him, her sister Missy (Poppy Lee Friar) brands him a sex offender. She tries to get him on the sex offender registry, since he is 17 and Hayley is 15. She later forgives him, and the pair continue their relationship.

Riz is described by the Royal Television Society as "sporty", "a good footballer" and "loyal", and they noted that he "has a real presence amongst his peers". Riz "feels personal integrity is very important", and "is a potential poster pupil for the school".

=== Chloe Voyle ===
Chloe Voyle (portrayed by Fern Deacon) is the daughter of Emma Keane (Liz White) and Nik Voyle (Stuart Manning). Originally living in London with Nik and his partner, she moves to Ackley Bridge to live with Emma. As she was unaware that Chloe was moving up the country to be with her, she is shocked and informs Chloe that she will be going back to her father's house. In retaliation, she posts a photo of Emma topless online, which spreads around the school. Chloe begins a relationship with Jordan Wilson (Samuel Bottomley), but the pair later break up. When she feels jealous of all the time her mother is spending with disadvantaged student Missy Booth (Poppy Lee Friar), she begins a relationship with a man in his thirties. When Emma finds out, she exposes him at his place of work for dating a teenager. After Missy dies, Nasreen Paracha (Amy-Leigh Hickman) mistakes Chloe's kindness for affection, and tries to kiss her. Chloe then outs Nasreen by telling people at school that Nasreen is a lesbian. In Series 5, Chloe came out as bisexual.

Actress Deacon stated that the role is "great fun to play", since her character is "the total opposite" of what she was like in school. She described Chloe as "such a rebel and very outspoken", and noted that she is "always pushing the boundaries". She added that it is "really enjoyable to play such a moody, brooding teenager". She expressed her gratitude at being the on-screen daughter of White, and described working with her as "amazing". Deacon stated that she was "absolutely terrified" on the first day of filming Ackley Bridge. She recalled being on a night shoot the evening before filming commenced. As it was her first main role in a drama series, she did not want to "mess it up". However, after a few days of filming with her "welcoming and friendly" co-stars, she stated that it was like they had been "friends for years". She added that she was grateful to be in the original cast of the series, since it meant that she had spent several years filming on the series, which she described as the best years of her life.

=== Lila Shariff ===
Lila Shariff (portrayed by Anneika Rose) is a science teacher at Ackley Bridge College. Student Nasreen Paracha (Amy-Leigh Hickman) knows her from her previous school, and since the pair thought they would never see each other again, they kissed. When they meet again, Nasreen is keen for them to continue their relationship. However, Lila explains to her that there are laws in place to protect students from dating teachers. Despite this, when Nasreen sees her on a night out, they kiss. Will Simpson (Tom Varey) develops a crush on Lila, but she informs him that she is a lesbian. She later comes out to her class.

Nasreen and Lila's kiss was described by Digital Spy as "the biggest moment of the episode", and noted that the lead-up to the kiss had "will-they-won't-they tension". Viewers opined that Lila's coming out scene was "a very important scene", since it depicted the representation of "sexuality in schools". Digital Spy wrote that it was especially important to show the sexuality of young Muslim women.

=== Simone Booth ===
Simone Booth (portrayed by Samantha Power) is the "estranged" mother of Missy (Poppy Lee Friar) and Hayley (Cody Ryan). Due to Simone being addicted to both alcohol and drugs, her mother Julie (Rita May) cares for her children. After Julie dies, Simone promises to step up as a mother in order for Hayley to stay with Missy. After Hayley has turned 16, Simone leaves, and they assume she has gone back to her addictive lifestyle. However, Missy sees her in town wearing a hijab. She explains to Missy that she has converted to Islam to help with her addictions. After Missy dies, she moves back in to take care of Hayley. Simone informs Fizza Akhtar (Yasmin Al-Khudhairi) that her mother Miriam Akhtar (Goldy Notay) has been attacked. Simone's addiction storyline was praised by Shout Out UK, who praised the realism that the storyline showed. They praised Ackley Bridge for "capturing modern problems".

=== Candice Murgatroyd ===
Candice Murgatroyd (portrayed by Emily Pyzer) is the cousin of Sam Murgatroyd (Megan Parkinson). She has a baby who she believes is Jordan Wilson's (Samuel Bottomley), but after he secretly performs a paternity test, it is revealed he is not the father. He questions Candice, who reveals that she has a one-night stand with his brother Cory (Sam Retford), meaning he is the father. After Candice and Sam attend an anti-Muslim march in Ackley Bridge, they face harassment from the Pakistani students at the school, and later get into a fight.

=== Naveed Haider ===
Naveed Haider (portrayed by Gurjeet Singh) is a student at Ackley Bridge College. Nasreen Paracha's (Amy-Leigh Hickman) mother Kaneez (Sunetra Sarker) finds videos of him ice skating online, and discovers that he is gay. She arranges for the two to meet, with plans of them partaking in a fake arranged marriage, since Nasreen is a lesbian. Since he is not out as gay to his parents, he is grateful for the opportunity, as is Nasreen, since she is not out to the local community. Naveed is kissed by Cory Wilson (Sam Retford), and the pair later have sex. Afterwards, Naveed comes out to his parents. Despite his father accepting his sexuality, his mother does not, so Naveed leaves home. He goes to Cory's house, but finds that he has just had sex with a woman. Shocked by how little that night meant to Cory, Naveed rushes off, and stays with Nasreen. Naveed talks to Cory, who says despite it feeling right, he is not gay. The pair then continue as friends. Naveed expresses an interest in becoming a comedian, which his mother disagrees with. His father finds his comedy funny, and encourages him. Naveed moves to Manchester to attend drama college.

An episode that was centred on LGBTQ+ characters to coincide with London Pride aired in July 2018. Digital Spy wrote that "much rejoicing ensued from viewers" when Cory kissed Naveed, and that viewers were "overjoyed" by the development. They later wrote that viewers were "heartbroken" when Cory and Naveed did not end up as a romantic pairing. They also wrote: "fans are adamant that this series cannot end without Cory and Naveed properly getting together".

=== Rashid Hyatt ===
Rashid Hyatt (portrayed by Tony Jayawardena) is a science teacher at Ackley Bridge College. Kaneez Paracha (Sunetra Sarker) accidentally knocks Rashid from his bike while learning to drive, and blames him for the accident. When he notices that student Razia Paracha (Nazmeen Kauser) has dyspraxia, he informs her mother, Kaneez. Despite initially disagreeing with him, she later thanks him for his help. He invites her to a restaurant, and the pair go back to his house for the night, despite her initial reservations. The pair later begin a relationship. Rashid spontaneously engages to Kaneez in a supermarket, to which she accepts. However, the pair agree that it is too soon, and celebrate having a "non-proposal" instead. Rashid informs that his mother Zainab Hyatt (Leena Dhingra) will be visiting them; Zainab immediately takes a dislike to Kaneez. Zainab tells Rashid about Kaneez's pregnancy scare, who confronts her. Kaneez confides in him, and he says that he will tell Zainab to stop being mean to her. Kaneez later tells Rashid that she is jealous that she believes that Razia's friend Hayley Booth (Cody Ryan) is pregnant and not her. When Zainab jokes about another man leaving Kaneez, Rashid confronts her and tells her to go back to Pakistan since he loves Kaneez.

Digital Spy wrote that viewers were "left in tears of joy" following Rashid and Kaneez's "non-proposal", and described it as "a sweet and very emotional scene".

=== Aaron Turner ===
Aaron Turner (portrayed by Adam Fielding) is the son of Sandra Turner (Vicky Entwistle) and Iqbal Paracha (Narinda Samra), and the half-brother of Nasreen (Amy-Leigh Hickman), Razia (Nazmeen Kauser) and Saleem Paracha (Yaseen Khan). He arrives in Ackley Bridge to confront Nasreen, as she does not know about Iqbal having a family with him. He informs her that he is her half-brother, and that Iqbal is in Bradford, as opposed to Pakistan, where she believes he is. Initially, Nasreen does not want to be associated with him, but she later forms a relationship with him. He begins a relationship with her best friend Missy Booth (Poppy Lee Friar). After attempting to put on a fireworks for Missy, he accidentally destroys his own car, he accepts her spontaneous marriage proposal. She later gets pregnant, and he believes that it is by accident, since she claims to be on the pill. However, Nasreen learns that she stopped taking it in order to get pregnant, believing she had no real prospects after leaving school. Missy later informs him that she has terminated the pregnancy, and feeling like she does not involve him in the relationship, he dumps her and leaves.

The Daily Express wrote that "fans were left unhappy" after Aaron and Missy's breakup. They added that while viewers were happy that Missy had made the decision to improve her life, they "couldn't help but express their frustration at the couple splitting up". Digital Spy echoed the comments, stating that viewers were "heartbroken" by the end of the relationship.

=== Javid Shah ===
Javid Shah (portrayed by Jay Saighal) is introduced as the deputy headteacher of Ackley Bridge College, brought in by Sadiq Nawaz (Adil Ray). His harsh teaching methods are not well received by students or his fellow teachers. Lorraine Bird (Lorraine Cheshire) overhears him criticising the students, saying that the majority of them will achieve nothing in life. She turns on the microphone to play across the school, and he is exposed. When he wants to overtake Mandy Carter's job as headteacher, he leaks confidential information about the school to the Valley Trust.

=== Sam Murgatroyd ===
Sam Murgatroyd (portrayed by Megan Parkinson) is the cousin of Candice (Emily Pyzer). Dressed as a chicken whilst distributing leaflets for a fried chicken shop, she steals Nasreen Paracha's (Amy-Leigh Hickman) shoes while she is attending mosque. Nasreen confronts her at school, and demands Sam gives her the shoes back. When she visits Sam's house during Missy and Aaron's engagement party to retrieve them, the pair have sex. Nasreen then sees Sam attending an anti-Muslim protest in the local area, and eggs her. Sam exclaims that Ackley Bridge is a white area, and that they are taking back their town. After Sam and Razia Paracha (Nazmeen Kauser) get into a fight after school, during which Razia accidentally stabs an intervening Nasreen with a stolen scalpel, Sam is falsely accused of stabbing her. At a meeting the next day, Sam defends the Parachas from her grandfather's racist rhetoric, and is exonerated when Razia is revealed to have committed the stabbing. The pair later begin a relationship. When Sam's mother Nadine (Natalie Gavin) is released from prison, she forces her to rob teacher Martin Evershed's (Rob James-Collier) house with her. Sam feels remorse for her actions and apologises to Martin. After learning that her mother intended to abandon her during the robbery as a decoy, Sam then reports Nadine to the police. Sam is made homeless by her family due to her betrayal, and begins staying in a youth centre. Nasreen ends their relationship before attending Oxford, having felt that she did not know truly her after Sam gave her advice on how to deal with the police after the pair were arrested for shoplifting (Nasreen having done so out of grief following Missy's death). Martin and Sue Carp (Charlie Hardwick) discover that there have been a string of robberies at the school. Sue accuses the travellers, but Sam later discovers that the Murgatroyds are responsible for the robberies and tells Martin. Tahir Randhawa (Shobhit Piasa) learns of Sam's broken relationship with her family and decides to write her a false letter from Nadine from prison. He writes that Sam can stay with Nadine following her release. However, Nadine is unexpectedly released on parole, so Sam leaves her hostel to stay with her. When Tahir learns, he admits that he has been writing the letters. He then confides in Sam that his mother died from cancer, which he blames himself for.

Parkinson's character and casting was announced by Metro on 10 July 2018. It was confirmed that she would be a love interest for Nasreen, with Metro writing that the series is "lining up an intense romance storyline for Nasreen. They added that after Nasreen "falls for her", she "makes a devastating discovery that could change everything". Sam is described as "feisty and not afraid to stand up for herself", as well as "confrontational and loud". Metro wrote that Sam meets Nas in "a confrontational scene", but that "the girls soon find themselves instantly attracted to one another and things move fast." Paul Fogarty wrote that Sam has "not exactly had the easiest of upbringings, no thanks to her mother Nadine".

=== Martin Evershed ===
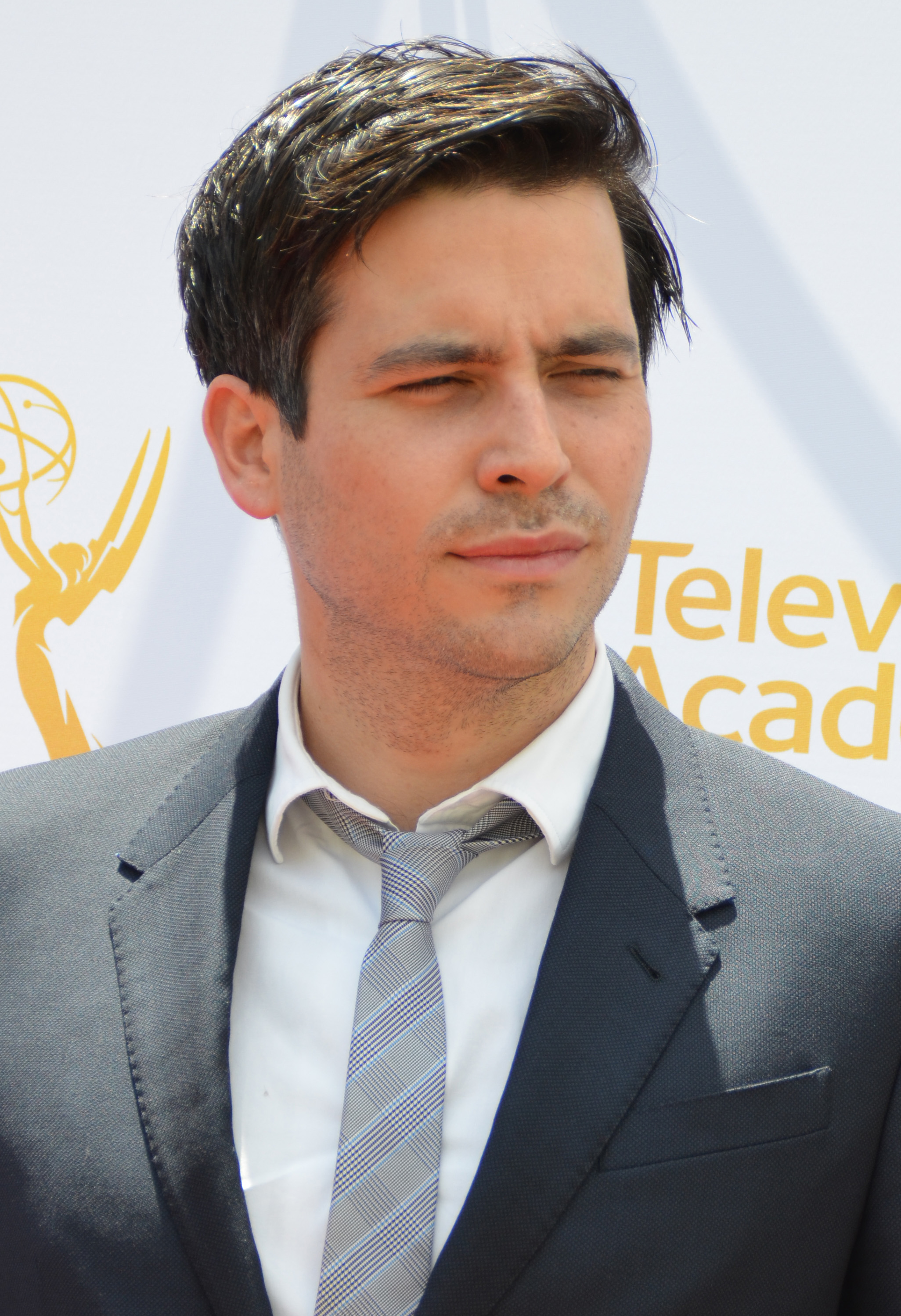
Rob James-Collier portrays Martin Evershed.

Martin Evershed (portrayed by Rob James-Collier) is the headteacher at Ackley Bridge College, as well as an English teacher. He is sent to teach at Ackley Bridge College as part of a transfer deal with the Valley Trust. Sue Carp (Charlie Hardwick) states that they have been sent there as they are the worst teachers, but Martin affirms that while people may disagree with his methods, he is a good teacher. On his first day, he clashes with Nadine Murgatroyd (Natalie Gavin), who he locks in a classroom as a joke. As revenge, she sets his car on fire. Martin then finds Nadine's daughter Sam (Megan Parkinson) robbing his house. Sam apologises to him, and Martin helps her to come to the decision to report Nadine to the police. He becomes interim headteacher following Sian Oakes' (Ty Glaser) suspension. Sue and Martin discover that there have been a string of robberies at the school. Sue accuses the travellers, but Sam later discovers that the Murgatroyds are responsible for the robberies and tells Martin. After former headteacher Mandy Carter (Jo Joyner) reveals that she is leaving her role as headteacher, Martin applies for it and receives the job. Martin attends couples counselling with his wife Gaynor (Jessica Kaliisa), who feels that he is focusing on his career too much. She later ends their marriage. Zainab Hyatt (Leena Dhingra) accompanies Martin and Kaneez on a school trip, and to Kaneez's annoyance, she takes over when she teaches the students. Martin downloads a dating app and begins talking to a woman named Jane located nearby. Student Marina Perry (Carla Woodcock) is revealed to be Jane, the woman Martin is talking to on a dating app. Johnny Cooper (Ryan Dean) reveals to Martin it is Marina talking to him. He texts Marina on the app, telling her that he knows it is her. Martin discovers a plan to develop Ackley Bridge College into housing. Martin calls Marina's mother Jules Perry (Gemma Paige North) in to talk about Marina catfishing him, and realises that she used Jules' photographs for the fake profile. Martin asks Jules to attend his parents' meeting regarding the plan to turn the school into housing. Afterwards, the pair kiss. Marina and her half-sister Kayla Azfal (Robyn Cara) see Martin leave their house after spending the night with Jules.

James-Collier's casting was announced by Channel 4 on 16 January 2019, alongside that of Hardwick's. He stated that he was "thrilled" to be asked to join Ackley Bridge due to being able to work with the "fearless and talented young actors", who he hoped he could learn from. On his character, James-Collier stated that he is "incredibly passionate about teaching English but he's not necessarily passionate about the bureaucracy, admin and politics that comes with it". He explains that Martin does not care about following rules or procedures, and will do "unorthodox things like play classical music full blast with the blinds down and lights off to get the kids dancing". He opined that Martin does not break rules to "undermine the system", but instead because "he knows that's the best way to reach the kids". On his arrival at the school, James-Collier explained that Mandy has been "promised these two teachers, who are really good apparently", but when she finds Martin "locking parents in classrooms", she begins to wonder "what have the Trust landed me with here?". He added: "she feels she's been lied to and has been sent the worst of the worst! But, over time, when it comes to Martin at least, Mandy sees his methods are different and realises it's coming from the right place" James-Collier stated that none of the younger actors on the series knew who he was, which he liked. He explained that they judged him based on if he was a "good lad". He stated: "I was 'certified' Level 5 on day one by young Zain Khan, who plays Zain Younis in the show, which means I'm a top bloke!".

=== Sue Carp ===
Sue Carp (portrayed by Charlie Hardwick) is the Deputy Head Teacher director of pupil behaviour at Ackley Bridge College that has been transferred from the Valley Trust, as well as a food technology teacher. Headteacher Mandy Carter (Jo Joyner) believes that Sue and fellow transfer Martin Evershed (Robert James-Collier) have been sent to her school as they are the best teachers on offer, but Sue informs them that it is the opposite, and they were sent to Ackley Bridge since they could not be fired. Rukhsana Ibrahim (Phoebe Tuffs-Berry) is sent to her after misbehaving in class, but Sue immediately dismisses her. This results in Rukhsana painting penises all over a school wall, and Sue is reprimanded by Mandy. Sue wins a makeover by student Candice Murgatroyd (Emily Pyzer). She does Sue's makeup, who returns home to show off her new look to her husband. However, he makes fun of her appearance. Mandy tasks Sue with the task of motivating dropout Cory Wilson (Sam Retford) to come back to school. She asks him to come in briefly so it looks like she has completed her task, and gives him a lift to the shop. She sees that Cory cannot afford much food, and buys him a basket of shopping. Sue then persuades Zain Younis Senior (Nish Nathwani) to give him a job as a chef. Sue and Martin discover that there have been a string of robberies at the school. Sue accuses the travellers, but Candice's cousin Sam Murgatroyd (Megan Parkinson) later discovers that the Murgatroyds are responsible for the robberies.

Hardwick's casting was announced on 16 January 2019, alongside that of James-Collier's. Hardwick voiced her excitement at joining Ackley Bridge, stating that she was "already a fan" of the series prior to her casting. She stated that the series is "funny and moving in equal measures and has a huge heart", but noted that her character is the opposite. Hardwick stated that it was "daunting" to join in the third series since it had an established cast and crew, but said that director Penny Woolcock, amongst other crew members, made her feel welcome on set. She noted that unlike her character, she enjoys working with the young actors and has to put on a "drained face on to film a scene". Hardwick stated that if Ackley Bridge was to be renewed for a fourth series, she would "bite the company's hand off" to sign up. She explained: "Things are dark and pretty politically difficult at the moment so it's nice for a show like Ackley Bridge – which is a fantastic example of diversity and representation for young people of all walks of life – act as a bit of niceness and goodness to counteract some of the hate in the world. Children are being divided and taught and interacted with separately due to culture, race and class – but what I see at Ackley is young performers from all walks of life coming together to create art". She said that one of her "best mates" on the series is Phoebe Tuffs-Berry, who portrays the role of student Rukhsana Ibrahim. Explaining that there is "no elitism" between the established and newer actors, she noted that the cast members "all equals with the same goals", and that she learns a lot from the young actors. She praised the writing team too, since they are not "middle class Eton men trying to write for young people", but are instead "writing their own experiences from youth". Due to this, Hardwick joked that she "will be right there waiting for that call", referring to the series' renewal.

She described Sue as "belligerent and unwilling", noting that "instead of dedicating her time to the well-being and development of her teenage students, she appears to be solely concerned with counting down the next ten years to her retirement". She based the character on her "bad" teacher from school. Hardwick admitted that Sue is "unwittingly witty, and somewhat unintentionally anarchic", noting that her behaviour would get the school "into deep doodoo", as well as getting herself into "dangerously sackable situations". She branded Sue as "a loose cannon and a professional nightmare", but stated that the behaviour of her character made her want to play the role. She added: "I thoroughly enjoy playing an unsympathetic disciplinarian". When asked what Sue's role as director of pupil behaviour meant, Hardwick explained: "in Sue's eyes, she's the jailor in charge of the punishment wing where the students who err get frog-marched". Hardwick stated that since Sue cannot retire until she is 67, she is "disillusioned" and "doesn't do anything that requires much energy". She noted that Sue is a "casual racist", and that after saying an offensive comment, she will "then add: 'No offence'". Due to this, Hardwick stated that if viewers do not like Sue, and are "horrified at her attitude", she is fine with that.

Duncan Lindsay of Metro wrote: "the jaws of Ackley Bridge viewers often drop when the racist assertions and statements come out of the member of staff's mouth". In an interview with Lindsay, Hardwick stated "she's a foul character and yet, we all know a Sue Carp sadly", expressing her disgust that there are teachers like her in real life. She explained that the racist statements are "hard to deliver" since she "deplore[s] racism in all its forms". However, she wanted Sue to be "shown for the bigot that she is". Hardwick explained that actors tend to "try to find a way to get a justification for their character", since they feel that having a more likeable character will make them more liked as an actor. However, she noted that she does "care about any of that". Since Sue is "monstrous and a total racist", Hardwick stated that they were not trying to redeem her to viewers. She also noted that in the final episode of series three, viewers "might just see an element of goodness in there", but she admitted that "a leopard rarely changes its spots" and that it would be a "long journey to ever be able to show her in a positive light". Hardwick went on to explain that Ackley Bridge are showing "young viewers that sometimes, the people in charge of their care aren't right and don't always know best". She expressed her gratitude that Sue was her role, since she "couldn't give a monkeys about people liking her" and was glad to "show her for what she is". She also praised the writers for being able to "show her up" and showcase her "abhorrent" attitude.

=== Pawel Nowicki ===
Pawel Nowicki (portrayed by Szymon Kantor) is a transfer student from the Valley Trust. When he first arrives at Ackley Bridge College, he is accompanied by, Rukhsana Ibrahim (Phoebe Tuffs-Berry). Director of pupil behaviour Sue Carp (Charlie Hardwick) is unable to communicate with him, since he speaks Polish and very little English. Headteacher Mandy Carter (Jo Joyner) gets Rukhsana to speak for him. In a food technology class with Sue, he mistakes period blood left on a seat for jam. He appears in season 3 and 4.

=== Rukhsana Ibrahim ===
Rukhsana Ibrahim (portrayed by Phoebe Tuffs-Berry) is a transfer student from the Valley Trust. She is introduced alongside Pawel Nowicki (Szymon Kantor), who she has to speak for since he speaks very little English. On her first day, she clashes with science teacher Rashid Hyatt (Tony Jayawardena), since she makes a big deal of a diagram of a penis in the biology textbook. He sents her to director of pupil behaviour Sue Carp (Charlie Hardwick), who dismisses her immediately, prompting Rukhsana to paint penises over a wall in school. She is reprimanded by school cook Kaneez Paracha (Sunetra Sarker). Rukhsana pokes fun at period blood on a chair, but feels guilty when she learns that it was left by Kacey 'Spud' Gartside (Zara Salim). She speaks to Spud, who explains that she gets tampons from the food bank, and she has run out. Rukhsana then buys a bag of menstrual products for Spud, and leaves them with her mother Debbie (Vicky Myers). Spud invites her to her house for dinner, to which she accepts. After leaving, she puts on a hijab.

Rukhsana goes out partying with the Ackley Bridge College rugby team, and photos of her dancing and kissing boys are posted online. She returns home to her mother and younger siblings, who she has to care for. The photos of her are sent to her older brother, who accuses her of being a slag. He tries to send Rukhsana to her uncle in Leicester, but she escapes from the car and goes to Spud's house. As revenge, Rukhsana prints nude photos of her brother, and hangs them at his workplace. He is fired, and leaves home. Rukhsana is left to care for her mother and younger siblings, until a loan shark arrives, demanding money. Unsure what to do, she begs her older brother to come home, to which he accepts. Feeling like she has to conform to Muslim standards, she begins wearing a hijab full-time and quits rugby. However, Kaneez persuades her to continue playing.

=== Younis Iqbal ===
Younis Iqbal (portrayed by Abdul Ahadbutt) is a student at Ackley Bridge College. After Sue Carp (Charlie Hardwick) pronounces the name of a Polish food dish wrong, and the Pakistani students are outraged as it sounds like a racial slur. Younis defends her, and Rukhsana Ibrahim (Phoebe Tuffs-Berry) is disgusted with him.

=== Kacey 'Spud' Gartside ===
Kacey 'Spud' Gartside (portrayed by Zara Salim) is a student at Ackley Bridge College. After Pawel Nowicki (Szymon Kantor) points out period blood on a chair, Spud feels embarrassed and leaves class. Rukhsana Ibrahim (Phoebe Tuffs-Berry), who made fun of the blood, apologises to Spud. She later drops by Spud's house and gives a bag of menstrual products to Spud's mother, Debbie (Vicky Myers). Spud invites Rukhsana over to her house for dinner, and the pair become friends. Spud becomes curious about her father, and since her mother had told her that he is Greek, she looks for Greek men around the town with Rukhsana. Deputy headteacher Martin Evershed (Rob James-Collier) finds them skipping school, and calls Debbie in. Spud confides in Debbie that she is curious about her father, who tells her that her father is school sponsor Sadiq Nawaz (Adil Ray). Despite her half-sister Alya (Maariah Hussain) not wanting to talk to Spud, she tells Sadiq to show Spud the same love that he has given to her.

=== Hassan Hussein ===
Hassan Hussein (portrayed by Hareet Deol) is a PE teacher at Ackley Bridge College. Headteacher Mandy Carter oversees one of his lessons, and tells deputy head Martin Evershed (Rob James-Collier) to help Hassan to improve his teaching methods. The pair notice that Hassan does not act as an authority figure to the students and would rather be seen as their friend. After a fight breaks out between the white and Asian students, Hassan takes the side of Zain Younis (Zain Khan). Martin reprimands him, but rather than adapting his attitude, Hassan affirms that he has grown up as an Asian person in the Ackley Bridge area, and knows what it is like. After a rival school is set up to challenge Ackley Bridge College, it is revealed that Hassan's father is running it. Mandy discovers that Hassan had given him information on the school such as absentee figures, but he claims it to have been accidental. He then supports Mandy in taking back control.

=== Sian Oakes ===
Sian Oakes (portrayed by Ty Glaser) is a temporary headteacher at Ackley Bridge College. Ken Weaver (George Potts) brings her in as Mandy Carter's (Jo Joyner) replacement, despite there being an appointed deputy head, Martin Evershed (Rob James-Collier). She reprimands students Cory Wilson (Sam Retford) and Naveed Haider (Gurjeet Singh) after their homework is found to be written exactly the same. A friend of Mandy's from a previous school, Sian goes for dinner with her at a restaurant. There, they see Cory, who reveals he is working as a cook there to help his father pay the bills. Sian realises that Naveed is writing Cory's homework since he has no time to do it, and schedules a set time in the school day for him to complete work. After Sian learns that Cory's father Kevin (Steve Jackson) has kicked him out, Sian allows Cory to stay at her house, with her fiancé. He kisses Sian, and she grooms him. When Cory tells friend Riz Nawaz (Nohail Mohammed) about the grooming, it spreads around school that Cory was groomed by a teacher. Sian tells Mandy about their kiss, but twists the narrative, telling her that Cory is obsessed with her. Cory punches Sian's fiancé, and reveals the truth. Mandy exposes Sian to Ken, and she is suspended.

Digital Spy wrote that viewers of the series were "disgusted" by the grooming storyline, stating that Sian was "taking advantage" of Cory, and begging for the storyline to stop.

=== Kayla Azfal ===
Kayla Azfal (portrayed by Robyn Cara) is a student at Ackley Bridge College. Whilst arriving at school, Kayla sees traveller Johnny Cooper (Ryan Dean) arrive on a horse and forms a crush on him. Her half-sister Marina Perry (Carla Woodcock) invites Johnny to her party and pets his horse, which excretes on her. They all laugh at Marina, and as revenge, Marina sets up a fundraising website for Kayla's supposed body hair removal. Kayla and her friend Fizza Akhtar (Yasmin Al-Khudhairi) interrupt Marina's party, where they talk about having body hair, to Marina's annoyance. Kayla then sees Fizza kissing Johnny at the party. Fizza blames her mother Miriam Akhtar (Goldy Notay) for deleting the text from Johnny, despite Kayla being responsible. She admits to deleting the text, and Fizza brands her a bad friend. Marina goes into school with her mother Jules Perry's (Gemma Paige North) bag, and when Kayla notices, the pair fight and the contents of the bag, including a bag of marijuana, is spilled onto the floor. Fizza takes the drugs so that Kayla does not get expelled, and forgives her. Kayla then realises her father is dealing drugs again. Johnny asks Kayla why she deleted the text, and she claims that she was protecting Fizza. However, when the pair wander off from the school trip together, she kisses him. Interim headteacher Martin Evershed (Rob James-Collier) finds the pair, and informs Johnny that his grandfather (Connor McIntyre) has had a heart attack. Fizza tells Kayla that despite initially wanting to be friends, she has a crush on Johnny, which Kayla tells him. Johnny's family member Queenie Cooper (Jasmine Payne) informs Fizza and Kayla that Johnny will soon Rose Boswell (Olivia Marie Fearn). Fizza learns that Kayla and Johnny kissed, leaving Fizza feel betrayed. The pair argue, and Kayla tells Fizza that she is a bad friend since she could not see her feelings for Johnny. Marina and Kayla see Martin leave their house after spending the night with Jules. Kayla tells Marina and Jules that she is fine with Johnny's wedding, but they do not believe her. Marina later apologises to Kayla for her behaviour. Fizza and Kayla reconcile their friendship, and decide to attend Johnny's wedding to Rose. A boy named Liam (Ole Madden) interrupts the wedding to say he loves Rose, and Johnny comes clean about his romantic feelings for Kayla. The pair run away from the wedding and kiss on a bus.

=== Marina Dobson ===
Marina Dobson (portrayed by Carla Woodcock; series 4 and Megan Morgan; series 5) is a student at Ackley Bridge College and the half-sister of Kayla Azfal (Robyn Cara). She is initially credited as Marina Perry. She invites Kayla's crush Johnny Cooper (Ryan Dean) to her party and pets his horse, which excretes on her. He and Kayla laugh at Marina, and as revenge, Marina sets up a fundraising website for Kayla's supposed body hair removal. When Johnny sees Marina, he grabs her phone and breaks it. Kayla and her friend Fizza Akhtar (Yasmin Al-Khudhairi) interrupt Marina's party, where they talk about having body hair, to Marina's annoyance. Marina goes into school with her mother Jules Perry's (Gemma Paige North) bag, and when Kayla notices, the pair fight and the contents of the bag, including a bag of marijuana, is spilled onto the floor. Marina is revealed to be Jane, the woman interim headteacher Martin Evershed (Rob James-Collier) is talking to on a dating app. Johnny tells Martin that he is an embarrassment, revealing it is Marina talking to him. He texts Marina on the app, telling her that he knows it is her. Martin calls Jules in to talk about Marina catfishing him, and realises that she used Jules' photographs for the fake profile. Marina and Kayla see Martin leave their house after spending the night with Jules. Kayla tells Marina and Jules that she is fine with Johnny's wedding, but they do not believe her. Marina later apologises to Kayla for her behaviour.

=== Fizza Akhtar ===
Fizza Akhtar (portrayed by Yasmin Al-Khudhairi) is a student at Ackley Bridge College and best friend of Kayla Azfal (Robyn Cara). She and Kayla interrupt her half-sister Marina Perry's (Carla Woodcock) party, where they talk about having body hair, to Marina's annoyance. Kayla then sees Fizza kissing Johnny Cooper (Ryan Dean) at the party. Johnny wants to begin a relationship with Fizza, but when he returns home, his grandfather (Connor McIntyre) mentions him getting married soon. After Fizza's mother Miriam Akhtar (Goldy Notay) learns that she has taken her young sister Zara Akhtar (Myra Sofia) to their father Asif Akhtar's (Raj Ghatak) drag performance, she leads an anti-sex education protest at Ackley Bridge College. At the protest, Fizza meets Gav Hadley (Louis De Gregory), a counter-protester, who invites her to an LGBTQ+ poetry night. Miriam forbids them from seeing Zara, but Fizza takes her horse-riding with Johnny, where she gets injured. Miriam takes Zara home, and tells Fizza to not see either of them again. Fizza reads a poem about her relationship with her mother, which Miriam arrives to hear. However, when the protestors follow her, Fizza assumes she targeted the poetry night and disowns her. Simone Booth (Samantha Power) informs Fizza that her mother has been attacked. She visits Miriam, who blames Fizza for her attack. Johnny texts Fizza, inviting her to a performance, but the text is deleted. Fizza blames her mother for deleting the text from Johnny, despite Kayla being responsible. She admits to deleting the text, and Fizza brands her a bad friend. Fizza and Johnny are locked in the music room together, where Fizza has sex with Johnny. Fizza takes the drugs so that Kayla does not get expelled, and forgives her. Fizza reveals to Kayla that she had sex with Johnny, but states that they are friends and that she prefers Gav. Johnny asks Kayla why she deleted the text, and she claims that she was protecting Fizza. Fizza tells Kayla that despite initially wanting to be friends, she has a crush on Johnny, which Kayla tells him. Fizza goes to apologise to her mother, but Miriam tells Fizza that she is responsible for their family breaking apart. Gav invites Fizza to an art show and when she is offended by the Islamophobic meaning depicted in his art, she realises that Gav attacked her mother. He is then arrested. Johnny comforts Fizza and in return, she tries to kiss him, but he avoids the kiss. Johnny's family member Queenie Cooper (Jasmine Payne) then informs Fizza and Kayla that Johnny will soon marry Rose Boswell (Olivia Marie Fearn). Fizza learns that Kayla and Johnny kissed, leaving Fizza to feel betrayed. The pair argue, and Kayla tells Fizza that she is a bad friend since she could not see her feelings for Johnny and felt jealous that Fizza and Johnny kissed at the party and had sex. Fizza and Kayla reconcile their friendship, and decide to attend Johnny's wedding to Rose.

=== Johnny Cooper ===
Johnny Cooper (portrayed by Ryan Dean) is a traveller, who is suspicious of Ackley Bridge College. Whilst arriving at school, Ackley Bridge student Kayla Azfal (Robyn Cara) sees Johnny arrive on a horse and forms a crush on him. Her half-sister Marina Perry (Carla Woodcock) invites Johnny to her party and pets his horse, which excretes on her. They all laugh at Marina, and as revenge, Marina sets up a fundraising website for Kayla's supposed body hair removal. When Johnny sees Marina, he grabs her phone and breaks it. Kayla then sees Johnny kissing her friend Fizza Akhtar (Yasmin Al-Khudhairi) at the party. Johnny wants to begin a relationship with Fizza, but when he returns home, his grandfather (Connor McIntyre) mentions him getting married soon. Fizza takes her younger sister Zara Akhtar (Myra Sofia) horse-riding with Johnny, where she gets injured. Johnny texts Fizza, inviting her to a performance, but the text is deleted. Fizza blames her mother Miriam Akhtar (Goldy Notay) for deleting the text from Johnny, despite Kayla being responsible. Fizza and Johnny are locked in the music room together, where Johnny has sex with her. Fizza reveals to Kayla that she had sex with Johnny, but states that they are friends and that she prefers counter-protester Gav Hadley (Louis De Gregory). Johnny asks Kayla why she deleted the text, and she claims that she was protecting Fizza. However, when the pair wander off from the school trip together, she kisses him. Interim headteacher Martin Evershed (Rob James-Collier) finds the pair, and informs Johnny that his grandfather has had a heart attack. To pay for his grandfather's funeral, Johnny arranges to fight somebody, which he loses. Fizza tells Kayla that despite initially wanting to be friends, she has a crush on Johnny, which Kayla tells him. Johnny tells Martin that he is an embarrassment, revealing it is Marina talking to him. He texts Marina on the app, telling her that he knows it is her. Johnny comforts Fizza and in return, she tries to kiss him, but he avoids the kiss. Johnny's family member Queenie Cooper (Jasmine Payne) then informs Fizza and Kayla that Johnny will soon marry Rose Boswell (Olivia Marie Fearn). Kayla tells Fizza that she is a bad friend since she could not see her feelings for Johnny. Johnny confides in Tahir Randhawa (Shobhit Piasa) that he does not want to marry Rose since he loves someone else. Kayla tells Marina and her mother Jules Perry (Gemma Paige North) that she is fine with Johnny's wedding, but they do not believe her. Fizza and Kayla reconcile their friendship, and decide to attend Johnny's wedding to Rose. A boy named Liam (Ole Madden) interrupts the wedding to say he loves Rose, and Johnny comes clean about his romantic feelings for Kayla. The pair run away from the wedding and kiss on a bus.

=== Queenie Cooper ===
Queenie Cooper (portrayed by Jasmine Payne) is a family member of Johnny Cooper (Ryan Dean). She informs Fizza Akhtar (Yasmin Al-Khudhairi) and her friend Kayla Azfal (Robyn Cara) that Johnny will soon marry Rose Boswell (Olivia Marie Fearn).

=== Tahir Randhawa ===
Tahir Randhawa (portrayed by Shobhit Piasa) is a student at Ackley Bridge College and nephew of Kaneez Paracha (Sunetra Sarker). Kaneez discovers him in bed with Hayley Booth (Cody Ryan) and tells him not to mess her around as she is still grieving for her deceased sister Missy Booth (Poppy Lee Friar). Hayley posts online that they are in a relationship, which he is shocked by. He tells Hayley that his parents have died, which she learns is a lie. Disgusted by his lies about death due to Missy's death, she dumps him. Tahir learns of Sam Murgatroyd's (Megan Parkinson) broken relationship with her family and decides to write her a false letter from her mother Nadine Murgatroyd (Natalie Gavin) from prison. He writes that Sam can stay with Nadine following her release. When Tahir learns that Sam is leaving the hostel to stay with her, he admits that he has been writing the letters. He then confides in Sam that his mother died from cancer, which he blames himself for. Hayley tricks Tahir into thinking she is pregnant which makes Kaneez furious due to thinking he is irresponsible. Tahir goes to visit his father in Manchester, but he is not there. He returns to Ackley Bridge where he learns that Kaneez knew his father had gone, and Hayley tells him the pregnancy was a joke. Tahir leaves, and Zainab Hyatt (Leena Dhingra) jokes about another man leaving Kaneez. Johnny Cooper (Ryan Dean) confides in Tahir that he does not want to marry Rose Boswell (Olivia Marie Fearn) since he loves someone else. Kaneez apologises to Tahir for not telling him the truth about his father leaving and says that he is welcome in their family.

=== Rose Boswell ===
Rose Boswell (portrayed by Olivia Marie Fearn) is the supposed wife of Johnny Cooper (Ryan Dean). Johnny's family member Queenie Cooper (Jasmine Payne) informs Fizza Akhtar (Yasmin Al-Khudhairi) and her friend Kayla Azfal (Robyn Cara) that Johnny will soon marry Rose. Johnny confides in Tahir Randhawa (Shobhit Piasa) that he does not want to marry Rose since he loves someone else. Fizza and Kayla decide to attend Johnny's wedding to Rose. A boy named Liam (Ole Madden) interrupts the wedding to say he loves Rose, and Johnny comes clean about his romantic feelings for Kayla.

=== Zainab Hyatt ===
Zainab Hyatt (portrayed by Leena Dhingra) is the mother of Rashid Hyatt (Tony Jayawardena). Rashid informs that Zainab will be visiting them from Pakistan; Zainab immediately takes a dislike to Rashid's partner Kaneez Paracha (Sunetra Sarker). Kaneez badmouths Zainab, who overhears and insults Kaneez. Zainab accompanies Kaneez and interim headteacher Martin Evershed (Rob James-Collier) on a school trip, and to Kaneez's annoyance, she takes over when she teaches the students. When Zainab almost collapses, she tells Kaneez that she is being too harsh on her and agrees to stop. She reveals that she has always lied about her parents being successful, and that her mother was a sex worker and she never knew her father. In return, Kaneez tells Zainab that she may be pregnant. Zainab tells Rashid about the pregnancy, who confronts her. Kaneez confides in him, and he says that he will tell Zainab to stop being mean to her. Zainab then jokes about another man leaving Kaneez when Tahir walks out of the house after an argument, causing Rashid to tell her to stop being so judgemental and go back to Pakistan if she can't support his relationship with Kaneez.

=== Kyle Dobson ===
Kyle Dobson (portrayed by Adam Little) is the younger brother of Marina (Megan Morgan) who joins Ackley Bridge College shortly after being released from a youth detention centre. Channel 4 described him as a "troublemaker". Digital Spy's Sophie Dainty also revealed that he would cause "several headaches for Kaneez Paracha (Sunetra Sarker) in her GCSE classes.

=== Asma Farooqi ===
Asma Farooqi (portrayed by Laila Zaidi) is an English teacher at Ackley Bridge College. Channel 4 described her as the school's "new hotshot teacher". They hinted that she would "immediately ruffle some feathers" and cause problems for Martin Evershed (Rob James-Collier). Digital Spy's Sophie Dainty explained that Martin feels pressure and scrutiny as headteacher of the school and that Asma makes his situation worse when she "arrives to stir things up".

== Recurring characters ==
=== Julie 'Nana' Booth ===
Julie 'Nana' Booth (portrayed by Rita May) is the grandmother of Missy (Poppy Lee Friar) and Hayley (Cody Ryan). She is their primary caregiver, since Simone (Samantha Power), her daughter, lives a life of drugs and alcohol addictions. When she wins money at bingo, it goes missing, and she guesses that Simone has stolen it. Missy and best friend Nasreen Paracha (Amy-Leigh Hickman) visit Simone, and take the money back. Before going to school, Missy goes upstairs to help Julie get out of the bath, but is distraught to find her dead in the bath. Unsure on what to do, she leaves her body, and goes to school. She later reports the death, but is unable to afford a funeral for her. Missy, Hayley, Nasreen and their teacher Emma Keane (Liz White) stand outside of the crematorium and sing her favourite song, "Bat Out of Hell" by Meat Loaf. She returns in a hallucination of Missy's, after Missy had died of a form of internal bleeding. She comforts her, and welcomes Missy to heaven. On the character, Royal Television Society wrote: "Nana has banned her granddaughters' destructive mother from the house. Nana has been living on her street for years but she's fed up of her Asian neighbours and still believes that one day they'll go back to Pakistan. She only leaves her house once a week to get her money from the Post Office."

=== Zain Younis ===
Zain Younis (portrayed by Zain Khan) is a student at Ackley Bridge College. He argues with Jordan Wilson (Samuel Bottomley) when Zain calls him out on his racism. Zain states that he has a crush on classmate Alya Nawaz (Maariah Hussain), who replies that he has no chance with her. His father, also named Zain Younis (Nish Nathwani), objects to Zain attending Ackley Bridge College, and attempts to make him quit for another school.

=== Kevin Wilson ===
Kevin Wilson (portrayed by Steve Jackson) is the father of Jordan (Samuel Bottomley) and Cory (Sam Retford). Jordan accidentally makes him miss a job interview, and since they are struggling to pay bills, he reprimands him. Jordan replies that he is an awful father, and that he does not want to be anything like him. Kevin responds by kicking and beating him. He is cautioned, and Jordan leaves home to live elsewhere. As a result, Kevin attempts suicide by going on the roof of his house. He falls off, and is taken to hospital. Cory has sex with Kevin's girlfriend, and he throws him out. He allows his girlfriend to continue living there, but not Cory, leading temporary headteacher Sian Oakes (Ty Glaser) to become involved. After Sian grooms Cory into an illegal relationship, Kevin does not care about the outcome for Cory.

=== Iqbal Paracha ===
Iqbal Paracha (portrayed by Narinder Samra) is the husband of Kaneez (Sunetra Sarker), and the father of Nasreen (Amy-Leigh Hickman), Razia (Nazmeen Kauser) and Saleem (Esa Ashraf/Yaseen Khan). Iqbal attempts to arrange a marriage for Nasreen with a boy from Pakistan, and she reluctantly agrees. Kaneez argues with Iqbal, as she feels that Nasreen is too young to get married. He states that they got married young, and she replies that it was not her decision. Nasreen learns that Iqbal has another family in Bradford; wife Sandra Turner (Vicky Entwistle) and two children. Nasreen tries to expose him to Kaneez, but she reveals that she has known of his other family for years, since he met Sandra first. Tired of being the other woman, Kaneez throws him out of her house, and throws his belongings from the window.

=== Granny Paracha ===
Granny Paracha (portrayed by Surinda Kaur; series 1 and Razia Yousaf series 2–present) is the grandmother of Nasreen (Amy-Leigh Hickman), Razia (Nazmeen Kauser) and Saleem (Esa Ashraf/Yaseen Khan), and the mother of Kaneez (Sunetra Sarker). Nasreen reveals to her that she is a lesbian, expecting her to be disgusted, but she is unexpectedly accepting of her sexuality.

=== Farida Nawaz ===
Farida Nawaz (portrayed by Anu Hasan) is married to Sadiq and the mother of Alya (Maariah Hussain) and Riz (Nohail Mohammed). Sadiq has various affairs with other women, and Royal Television Society wrote that Farida knows of his affairs, but "turns a blind eye" as long as it does not become a scandal. Riz invites Cory Wilson (Sam Retford) over to the Nawaz's house for dinner, and after he leaves, Farida discovers her jewellery is missing. They later learn that Sadiq has been selling her jewellery since he is running out of money. Due to losing their business and family home, they are forced to move in with Farida's sister. After Sadiq learns that Kacey 'Spud' Gartside (Zara Salim) is his daughter, he tells Farida that he will not associate with her if she wants. However, she tells him that he has a responsibility to Spud as her father.

=== Maryam Qureshi ===
Maryam Qureshi (portrayed by Kiran Landa; series 1 and Meryl Fernandes; series 2) is the partner of Samir (Arsher Ali). She is unaware that he is having an affair with Emma Keane (Liz White), and when she sees Emma outside of her house, she invites her in for tea. Maryam and Samir get married, but he is soon stabbed, and Maryam struggles to grieve for him.

=== Sandra Turner ===
Sandra Turner (portrayed by Vicky Entwistle) is the first partner of Iqbal Paracha (Narinda Samra), and the mother of Aaron (Adam Fielding). Iqbal's daughter Nasreen (Amy-Leigh Hickman) is approached by Aaron, who informs her of his family's existence, as prior to this, she did not know her father's other family. She visits Sandra and her family, and despite Sandra warmly inviting her in, she is hurt and leaves. Nasreen's sister Razia (Nazmeen Kauser) also visits her, and has the same reaction. Finally, Iqbal's wife Kaneez (Sunetra Sarker) visits Sandra to confront her. She tells Sandra that she is leaving Iqbal, and is welcome to have him. Sandra affirms that she loves Iqbal, and that Kaneez is the "other woman", confirming that she met Iqbal first.

Entwistle's casting was announced on 22 May 2018, and it was confirmed that her character would lead to "the truth" coming out about Iqbal's lies. On appearing in the series, Entwistle commented: "I am thrilled to be joining the very talented cast of Ackley Bridge and look forward to watching how everything unfolds. I had a great time filming with a wonderful bunch of people." Metro added that her arrival would be "part of a huge storyline that will tear the Paracha family apart". She stated that it was "a tad unnerving" to join an ongoing series since the cast and crew had already established a relationship. However, they made her feel "at ease" due to being "very welcoming". Entwistle knew Hickman prior to joining the series as she had co-starred with her in a theatre production. When asked what had attracted her to the role of Sandra, Entwistle stated that portraying the mother of mixed-race children had "really intrigued" her, and that from an acting perspective, it was interesting to learn about a different culture. She also wanted to "hopefully portray an honest depiction of how the merging of those can bring pleasure".

Entwistle described her character as "a hard-working, loving woman" who "loves her family" and has a "beautiful home". She confirmed that Sandra knows about Iqbal's other family and "doesn't particularly like the situation", but stays with him since she loves him. She added that Sandra is "a kind woman", and will understand that everyone involved in the secret "will feel some sort of pain when the truth comes out", but hopes that it will "settle down" with time. Entwistle explained that Sandra has "always been in the background of Iqbal's life" since they have two children together and "share a deep love & understanding for each other". On the secret emerging, she stated that Sandra "knew it would only be a matter of time before everything began to unravel". After her first episode of Ackley Bridge aired, Digital Spy wrote that her appearance had "definitely surprised viewers", since they knew her from her role as Janice Battersby in the ITV soap opera Coronation Street.

=== Claire Butterworth ===
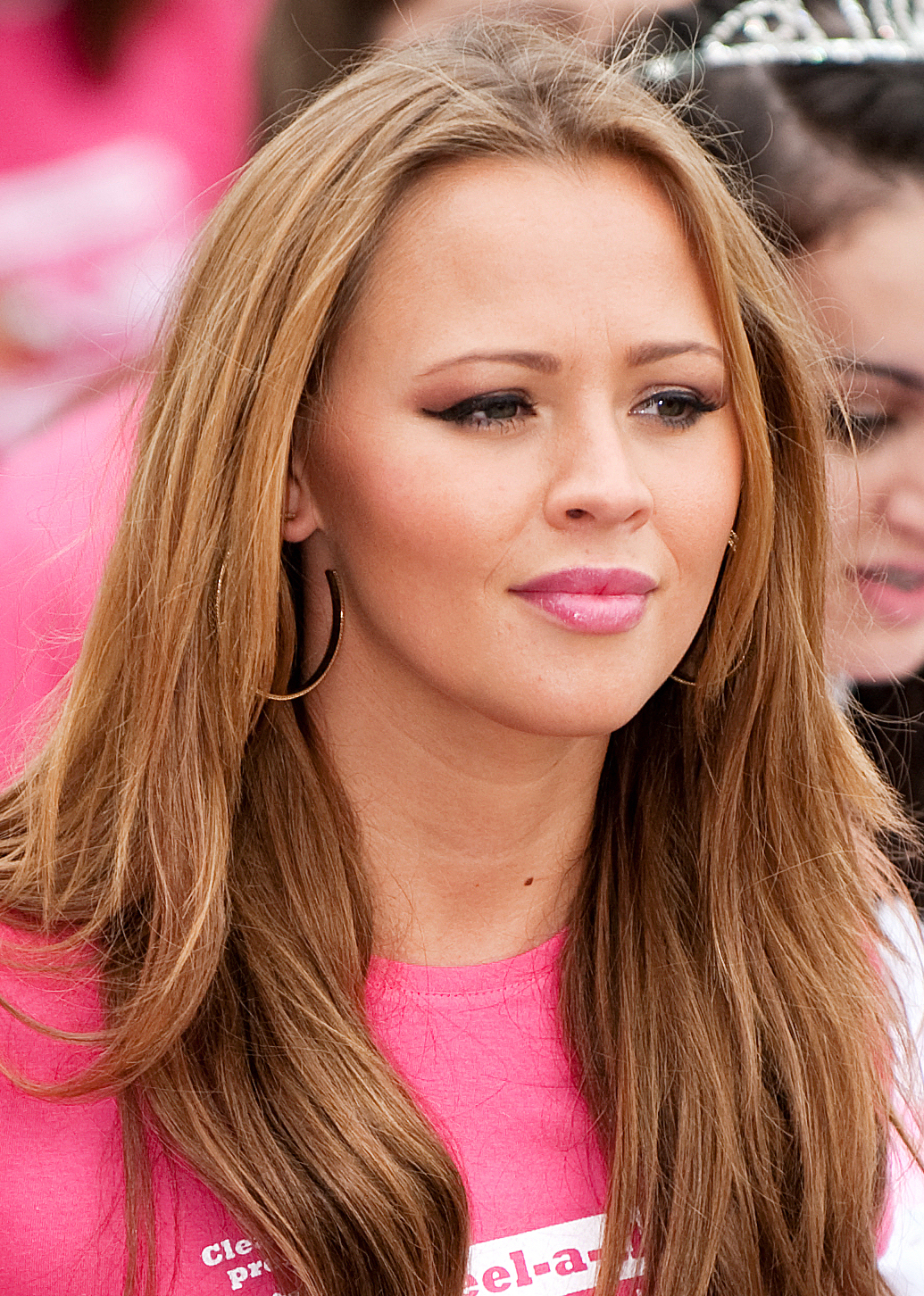
Kimberley Walsh portrays Claire Butterworth.

Claire Butterworth (portrayed by Kimberley Walsh) is the ex-partner of Steve Bell (Paul Nicholls), with whom she shares a child, Zak. She arrives at Ackley Bridge College to discuss plans with Steve, and argues with his wife, Mandy Carter (Jo Joyner). Claire tries to get back with Steve when he is suspended, teling him that Mandy should support him professionally. Mandy then confronts Claire at a bowling alley, where she tells her to back off.

Walsh's casting was announced on 22 May 2018, where it was stated that she "jumps at the chance to get her claws back into Steve". Walsh stated that Claire is "quite different" to other characters she has portrayed, stating she is "sassy and strong and comes to blows a few times with Mandy". She added that it was a fun role to play, and that she enjoyed working with Joyner and Nicholls. On why she chose to join the series, Walsh explained that it is filmed near to where she grew up. She added that it was "really nice to be a part of such a brilliant northern drama", and enjoyed hearing Northern accents on set. The character was mentioned in series one, and Radio Times wrote that after she is "finally" introduced, "she doesn't disappoint". Radio Times described Claire as a "home-wrecking netball teacher", and noted that her role is "key" in the second series.

What's on TV wrote to "expect a love war" between Claire and Mandy, with Channel 4 adding that "Claire is set to ruffle some feathers when she turns up unannounced at Ackley Bridge." On Claire's backstory, Walsh commented: "Claire had an affair with Steve, they were never officially an item but they have a young child together. With Steve it's clear she always wanted something more. She enjoys being a shoulder to cry on and she knows it bothers Mandy". Walsh explained that since Mandy "holds all the power when it comes to Steve", Claire enjoys annoying her, and that it "feels like an achievement" when she "gets a rise out of her".

=== Grandpa Murgatroyd ===
Grandpa Murgatroyd (portrayed by Steve Money) is the grandfather of Sam (Megan Parkinson) and Candice (Emily Pyzer). He is part of a far right movement against Muslims, and forces Sam and Candice to accompany him to anti-Muslim marches. When headteacher Mandy Carter (Jo Joyner) believes that Sam has stabbed student Nasreen Paracha (Amy-Leigh Hickman), she calls him in for a meeting to discuss her punishment. He argues with Nasreen's mother Kaneez (Sunetra Sarker), making racist comments. When Sam tells him to stop, he claims she has been groomed by Muslims at the school. After Sam reports mother Nadine (Natalie Gavin) to the police, he kicks Sam out for betraying the family.

=== Anwar Wazir ===
Anwar Wazir (portrayed by Antonio Aakeel) is a resident of Ackley Bridge. Whilst speeding in his car, he accidentally runs over Nasreen Paracha (Amy-Leigh Hickman) and Missy Booth (Poppy Lee Friar). He sticks around to wait for the ambulance to come. Despite initially being believed to be okay, Missy dies in her sleep due to an internal bleed. Nasreen struggles to cope with the death of her best friend, and goes for a walk in the town to get away from everybody. She sees Anwar at his house, and learns that he only lives three streets away from her. Nasreen instructs Sam Murgatroyd (Megan Parkinson) to hurt him, and she gets her cousins to beat him. They post the video of the beating online, and despite it being a revenge attack, the town believes it to be a hate crime. This causes a racial divide in the town, and Nasreen meets with Anwar. The pair apologise to each other for what they have done.

=== Debbie Gartside ===
Debbie Gartside (portrayed by Vicky Myers) is the mother of Kacey (Zara Salim), also known as Spud. After Spud's classmate Rukhsana Ibrahim (Phoebe Tuffs-Berry) learns that Debbie gets their menstrual products from a food bank, she goes to their house and gives Debbie a bag of tampons. Debbie is happy that Spud has made a friend, and tells her to invite Rukhsana over for dinner at their house.

=== Ken Weaver ===
Ken Weaver (portrayed by George Potts) is a teacher from the Valley Trust, who becomes the boss of headteacher Mandy Carter (Jo Joyner) at Ackley Bridge College. He affirms that the school will not work due to the racial divide in the town, but Mandy disagrees with him. When Mandy needs to go on maternity leave, he hires Sian Oakes (Ty Glaser) to stand in for her, despite the school already having a deputy headteacher Martin Evershed (Rob James-Collier). The Daily Express described him as "Mandy's new nightmare boss".

=== Nadine Murgatroyd ===
Nadine Murgatroyd (portrayed by Natalie Gavin) is the mother of Sam (Megan Parkinson). In series three, she is released from prison. Upon being released, she clashes with Martin Evershed and later sets his car on fire. He confronts her on the street, and as revenge, she enlists Sam's help, as well as her cousins, to rob Martin's house. When Sam is caught, Nadine insists on leaving her behind rather than driving away with her. Sam learns of this, and feeling like she will never be a good mother, she reports Nadine to the police. Nadine tells Sam that there is nothing else she thought of in prison but her, and that she will do anything for Sam, including serve time in prison; she is then arrested.

=== Zain Younis Senior ===
Zain Younis Senior (portrayed by Nish Nathwani) is the father of Zain Younis (Zain Khan). He disagrees with Zain attending the school, and attempts to make him attend a local Muslim school instead. He owns a restaurant in the local area, which he gives Zain's classmate Cory Wilson (Sam Retford) a job in. Teacher Sue Carp (Charlie Hardwick) asks Zain to give a promotion to Cory. He tries a food dish made by Cory, and agrees that he can cook well giving him the job.f

=== Jules Perry ===
Jules Perry (portrayed by Gemma Paige North) is the mother of Marina Perry (Carla Woodcock). Marina goes into school with Jules' bag, and when her half-sister Kayla Azfal (Robyn Cara) notices, the pair fight and the contents of the bag, including a bag of marijuana, is spilled onto the floor. Interim headteacher Martin Evershed (Rob James-Collier) calls Jules in to talk about Marina catfishing him, and realises that she used Jules' photographs for the fake profile. Martin asks Jules to attend his parents' meeting regarding the plan to turn the school into housing. Afterwards, the pair kiss. Marina and Kayla see Martin leave their house after spending the night with Jules. Kayla tells Marina and Jules that she is fine with her crush Johnny Cooper's (Ryan Dean) wedding, but they do not believe her.

=== Asif Akhtar ===
Asif Akhtar (portrayed by Raj Ghatak) is the father of Fizza Akhtar (Yasmin Al-Khudhairi). After Fizza's mother Miriam Akhtar (Goldy Notay) learns that she has taken her young sister Zara Akhtar (Myra Sofia) to Asif's drag performance, she leads an anti-sex education protest at Ackley Bridge College.

=== Zara Akhtar ===
Zara Akhtar (portrayed by Myra Sofia) is the younger sister of Fizza Akhtar (Yasmin Al-Khudhairi). After Fizza's mother Miriam Akhtar (Goldy Notay) learns that she has taken Zara to their father Asif Akhtar's (Raj Ghatak) drag performance, she leads an anti-sex education protest at Ackley Bridge College. Miriam forbids them from seeing Zara, but Fizza takes her horse-riding with Johnny Cooper (Ryan Dean), where she gets injured. Miriam takes Zara home, and tells Fizza to not see either of them again.

=== Miriam Akhtar ===
Miriam Akhtar (portrayed by Goldy Notay) is the mother of Fizza Akhtar (Yasmin Al-Khudhairi). After she learns that Fizza has taken her young daughter Zara Akhtar (Myra Sofia) to their father Asif Akhtar's (Raj Ghatak) drag performance, she leads an anti-sex education protest at Ackley Bridge College. At the protest, Fizza meets Gav Hadley (Louis De Gregory), a counter-protester, who invites her to an LGBTQ+ poetry night. Miriam forbids them from seeing Zara, but Fizza takes her horse-riding with Johnny Cooper (Ryan Dean), where she gets injured. Miriam takes Zara home, and tells Fizza to not see either of them again. Fizza reads a poem about her relationship with Miriam, which she arrives to hear. Miriam is then confronted in the street by two hooded men. Simone Booth (Samantha Power) informs Fizza that Miriam has been attacked. Fizza visits Miriam, who blames her for her attack. Fizza blames Miriam for deleting the text from Johnny, despite her friend Kayla Afzal (Robyn Cara) being responsible. Fizza goes to apologise to Miriam, but Miriam tells Fizza that she is responsible for their family breaking apart. Gav invites Fizza to an art show and when she is offended by the Islamophobic meaning depicted in his art, she realises that Gav attacked Miriam.

=== Gav Hadley ===
Gav Hadley (portrayed by Louis De Gregory) is a counter-protester. At an anti-sex education protest, Fizza Akhtar (Yasmin Al-Khudhairi) meets Gav, who invites her to an LGBTQ+ poetry night. Her mother Miriam Akhtar (Goldy Notay) forbids them from seeing her young daughter Zara Akhtar (Myra Sofia). Fizza reveals to her friend Kayla Afzal (Robyn Cara) that she had sex with Johnny Cooper (Ryan Dean), but states that they are friends and that she prefers Gav. Gav invites Fizza to an art show and when she is offended by the Islamophobic meaning depicted in his art, she realises that Gav attacked Miriam. He is then arrested.
