= Ackley Bridge series 5 =

Ackley Bridge
- Series 5
- DVD cover
- No. of episodes: 10

Release
- Original network: All 4
- Original release: 11 July 2022

Series chronology
- ← Previous; Series 4

The fifth and final series of the British television drama series Ackley Bridge premiered on All 4 on 11 July 2022. It was later broadcast on Channel 4. The series follows the lives of the staff and pupils at the fictional multi-cultural academy school Ackley Bridge College, in the fictitious Yorkshire mill town of Ackley Bridge. The commissioning of the series was confirmed in June 2021 and filming commenced in November of that year. The series consists of ten thirty-minute episodes that were transmitted in the revised timeslot of 10pm on Channel 4.

== Production and casting ==
On 17 June 2021, it was announced in a report by Production Weekly that production on the fifth series of Ackley Bridge had commenced that week. Channel 4 formally announced the renewal of Ackley Bridge in November 2021 and said that the fifth series would follow the second half of the school year that began in the previous series. They revealed that actor Ashley Walters would make his directorial debut by directing half of the series, with the remaining five episodes helmed by Reza Moradi. Writers included Damian Mullen, Alexander Stewart and Emteaz Hussain. The role of Marina Dobson was recast to Megan Morgan as opposed to previous actress Carla Woodcock. New castings for the series included Adam Little as Kyle Dobson, the younger brother of Marina, and Laila Zaidi as Asma Farooqi, a new "hotshot teacher [who] ruffles some feathers".

The Halifax Courier confirmed that filming for the series would commence in November 2021. Shortly after filming began, it was announced that drag queen Baga Chipz had been cast in a guest role for the series. In June 2022, it was announced by Digital Spy that the fifth series would air on Channel 4 in July of that year. Promotional photos and storyline teasers were also released. On 11 July, the series premiered on All4. That same night, it begin airing on Channel 4 at the revised timeslot of 10pm. The series aired two episodes per night over the course of a week.

== Cast ==
=== Main ===
- Sunetra Sarker as Kaneez Paracha
- Nazmeen Kauser as Razia Paracha
- Cody Ryan as Hayley Booth
- Yousef Naseer as Saleem Paracha
- Lorraine Cheshire as Lorraine Bird
- Fern Deacon as Chloe Voyle
- Tony Jayawardena as Rashid Hyatt
- Rob James-Collier as Martin Evershed
- Charlie Hardwick as Sue Carp
- Phoebe Tuffs-Berry as Rukhsana Ibrahim
- Abdul Ahadbutt as Younis Iqbal
- Zara Salim as Kacey 'Spud' Gartside
- Hareet Deol as Hassan Hussein
- Robyn Cara as Kayla Azfal
- Yasmin Al-Khudhairi as Fizza Akhtar
- Ryan Dean as Johnny Cooper
- Jasmine Payne as Queenie Cooper
- Megan Morgan as Marina Dobson
- Adam Little as Kyle Dobson
- Laila Zaidi as Asma Farooqi

=== Recurring ===
- Razia Yousaf as Granny Paracha
- George Potts as Ken Weaver
- Gemma Paige North as Jules Perry
- Raj Ghatak as Asif Akhtar
- Myra Sofia as Zara Akhtar
- Goldy Notay as Miriam Akhtar
- Andrew Knott as Dean Dobson
- Tara Berwin as Xanthe
- Noé Sébert as Josh Turnbull
- Louis Healy as Jasper

=== Guest ===
- Kelli Hollis as Linda Loan Shark
- Ellie Pawsey as Police Officer
- Richard Hand as Walter
- Olivia Marie Fearn as Rose Boswell
- Connor McIntyre as Grandad Cooper
- Baga Chipz as Rusty Pipez
- Holly Dempster as Elspeth
- Robyn Ellen Ashwood as Charmaine
- Ace Bhatti as Imran Farooqi
- Esther-Grace Button as Lady Rose Garden
- Hope Yolanda as Magda
- Jackie Knowles as Trisha
- Sophie Mensah as Doctor

== Episodes ==
No. overall	No. in series	Title	Directed by	Written by	Original release date
37	1	"Episode 1"	Ashley Walters	Suhayla El-Sushra	11 July 2022
Marina is told by Martin that she is failing all of her subjects, and to embarrass her, Fizza exposes her failings. As revenge, Marina organises an online system to rate the girls of Ackley Bridge College, with the intention of rating higher than Fizza. She is reprimanded by Martin, who also scolds her for posting revealing images of herself online. Marina affirms that she can make more of herself from her looks than studying and goes on to host a bikini carwash at the school, which is shut down by Martin and Ken. She returns home to find that Jules has gotten the family into debt and that they have been evicted, leaving them living with Martin. Marina tells Jules that she wants to live with her father, later signing up for an over-18 website to sell images of herself. Asma arrives at the school having stolen a statue from the local town. Hassan offers to carry the statue for her and flirts with her. Asma is arrested for stealing it and when she returns home, she gets drunk.
38	2	"Episode 2"	Ashley Walters	Suhayla El-Sushra	11 July 2022
Kayla tells Johnny that she wants them to have sex for the first time. She admits her nervousness to Fizza since she is a virgin. Kayla searches how to be confident in sex online, and after the pair stay in a B&B, she tries out what she has learned on Johnny. He pulls away and an embarrassed Kayla leaves. Martin informs Marina that as part of staying on at the school, she must play as part of the school's rugby team. Kayla joins her as support and after she gets hit on the head with a rugby ball, Johnny takes her home. They talk about their failed attempt at sex and after making up, they have sex. Jules gets a job interview and practices her interview skills with Martin, after which she gets offered a job in Glasgow.
39	3	"Episode 3"	Ashley Walters	Damian Mullen	11 July 2022
To Marina's surprise, Kyle, her brother, arrives at the school after being released from prison. He learns that Asma is his English teacher and mocks her for teaching English. In Asma's class, he projects racist views and is sent out. Kyle asks Marina not to leave with Jules and Kayla for Glasgow and to move in with him and their gambling addicted father, to which she agrees. Once there, a man on Marina's subscription website offers her £20 for a photo of her body, and she sends him a photo of herself in her bra. Kayla informs Johnny that she may be leaving Ackley Bridge, who tries to persuade her to stay. He meets with Loan Shark Linda and agrees to deliver drugs for money so that he can afford to live by himself with Queenie. He hopes that his income will make Kayla agree to stay, but Kayla affirms that she has to move and the pair say their goodbyes. Ken informs Kaneez that since she has no qualifications, she must pass her English and Maths GCSES to stay in her role at the school.
40	4	"Episode 4"	Ashley Walters	Alexander Stewart	11 July 2022
Fizza struggles to care for her father, but when he tries to relieve her of her duties, she affirms that she wants to care for him. She gives Asif his medication for his bipolar, but unbeknownst to her, he does not take them. Asma appoints Fizza as the captain of her new debate team, informing her of the opportunities it could give her at university. Chloe joins the debate team, as well as Marina. Asma invites her lawyer friend to the debate, who tries to get Asma to go out for a drink, but she declines. At the debate, Fizza succeeds but is shocked when a manic Asif arrives. She leaves midway to take him home, where Chloe visits her. Chloe comforts her and the pair kiss. Marina goes on her subscription website to see a message asking to see her naked. She charges the man £50 and sends him a nude photograph.
41	5	"Episode 5"	Ashley Walters	Kim Revill	11 July 2022
Ken sees Kaneez supporting Kyle and condescends her by saying that he will be shocked if she can help him. She then learns that Kyle's father breeds dogs for fighting and threatens to call the police. However, she does not want to risk Kyle going back to prison, so she helps him to take the dogs to an animal shelter. Chloe confronts Fizza about the kiss they shared, where the pair flirt. Fizza invites Chloe to a poetry night. Asma's father messages her demanding that she leaves her job and returns home, so she sends him a photo of herself and Hassan, claiming she cannot return since they are dating. Fizza finds a manic Asif in an ice cream truck late at night. She runs to Asma's house for help, where she finds her drunk. Marina receives threatening messages on her website and decides to delete her account.
42	6	"Episode 6"	Reza Moradi	Emteaz Hussain	11 July 2022
Asma worries that Fizza has exposed her being drunk so confronts her at the school. Her father arrives at the school and tells her that he has donated to the school so that she can leave. Asma affirms that she enjoys her job there and that she will be staying. At parent's evening, Asma informs Miriam of Fizza's father being manic and affecting her education. In response, Fizza exposes Asma for being drunk. She later confides in Hassan about her alcoholism. Johnny falls asleep in class and is told by Martin and Rashid that he should give up performing late at night to focus on his education. Martin withdraws funds from the school banking to support him; when this is found out by Ken, he suspends Martin and appoints Sue as acting head. Marina learns of Chloe and Fizza's date at the poetry night and tags along. She goes to leave and expects Chloe to follow, but when she does not, Marina tells Fizza that Chloe is not interested in her but does not want to tell her. Fizza then tells a confused Chloe to leave.
43	7	"Episode 7"	Reza Moradi	Suhayla El-Sushra	11 July 2022
A rugby game is held and when she is made fun of by the opposing team, Marina nearly pulls out. The team continue to taunt her during the game and she tries to start a fight, which is stopped by Asma, who tells her to channel her rage into the game. Her team win and she is later invited to a house party by Josh, a boy from the opposing school. Marina admits to Chloe that she intervened between her and Fizza, admitting that her reasoning was being scared to lose Chloe. Afterwards, Josh takes her to a private room and reveals that he was subscribed to her subscription website. Josh pushes her to have sex despite her not wanting to and rapes Marina. Hassan invites Asma on a date and she pours alcohol in her drink, unbeknownst to Hassan. When she goes to the toilet, he smells her drink and confronts her on her lies. She reacts badly and leaves.
44	8	"Episode 8"	Reza Moradi	Damian Mullen	11 July 2022
Marina is disgusted to receive messages and flowers from Josh. Martin notices her being upset and asks her what has happened, to which she says what Josh did to her. He calls the police and she tells a support officer what happened. Josh's father turns up at Marina's house and tries to bribe Dean with £5000 to retract her statement, but he refuses, to Marina's surprise. Hayley shows Marina a video that acts as evidence for Josh's guilt, but Marina says that she does not want to be remembered as a girl that was assaulted, telling her to delete it. Josh and his rugby team arrives at Ackley Bridge College to play a match and her classmates stand with signs in support of Marina. Sue demands he leave, before which Marina confronts him and sends the evidence to everybody to expose him. Jules returns from Glasgow and promises to stick around for Marina.
45	9	"Episode 9"	Reza Moradi	Kim Revill	11 July 2022
As she is entering her English literature exam, Fizza receives a call from Asif displaying suicidal tendencies. She tries to focus but runs out of the exam hall minutes into the exam. Asma follows her and says that she will drive her to Asif, where she talks him down from a bridge. She confesses that she is an alcoholic, hoping to make him level with her, which succeeds. After she has helped to get Asif sectioned, Asma decides that she is not going to leave Ackley Bridge. Kyle believes that he has gotten access to a copy of the exam paper that himself and Kaneez are taking and gives her a copy of it. She does not read it but is nervous to be caught with it. She confesses to Rashid, who informs her that the paper is a mock exam from the previous year. Rashid confronts Kyle, telling him that if he compromises Kaneez again, he will report him. However, Kyle responds by saying that if Rashid does that, he will expose Kaneez for taking his dogs to the shelter.
46	10	"Episode 10"	Reza Moradi	Kim Revill	11 July 2022
Queenie informs Johnny that their family are moving to another site and that she wants to go with them instead of staying with him. After he wants to give up on an audition for a music school, Rashid pushes him to attend it. Johnny invites Rose to the end of year ball, where he tells Queenie that she should go with the family when they leave Ackley Bridge. Marina and Chloe visit Fizza prior to the end of year ball and glam her up. They accompany her to the mental health unit that Asif is staying at, with Fizza worrying that he will be mad at her for allowing him to he sectioned. However, he apologises to her for the state he got into. Asma tells Hassan that she likes him romantically, after which she attends her first alcoholics anonymous support group. Martin confides in Jules that time away from the school has made him doubt his career aspirations and that he may not return. His meeting with the governors is interrupted by Marina, who tells them that he is a good headteacher and that if he is fired, she will contact the press and get the students to go on strike. Her attempt is successful when Ken informs Martin that he can keep his job.
