= Sadiq Nawaz =

Fictional character from Ackley Bridge

- Ackley Bridge character
- First appearance: Episode 1; 7 June 2017
- Last appearance: Episode 26; 6 August 2019
- Portrayed by: Adil Ray

In-universe information
- Occupation: Businessman
- Spouse: Farida Nawaz
- Significant other: Mandy Carter
- Children: Alya Nawaz (daughter); Riz Nawaz (son); Kacey 'Spud' Gartside (daughter)
- Religion: Muslim
- Nationality: Pakistani-British

Sadiq Nawaz is a fictional character from the Channel 4 school drama Ackley Bridge, portrayed by Adil Ray. Sadiq first appeared in the pilot episode of the series, first broadcast on 7 June 2017. Sadiq is introduced as the school sponsor of the fictional Ackley Bridge College, as well as a local businessman. His storylines in the series include having an affair with headteacher Mandy Carter (Jo Joyner), losing his business due to financial struggles and discovering he has a third child.

== Storylines ==
Sadiq is introduced as the father of Alya (Maariah Hussain) and Riz (Nohail Mohammed), and the husband of Farida (Anu Hasan). He is the sponsor of Ackley Bridge College, and also owns a factory. Sadiq has an affair with headteacher Mandy Carter (Jo Joyner), causing a rivalry between him and Mandy's husband Steve Bell (Paul Nicholls) as Sadiq and Steve co-coach the school rugby team. When Alya discovers the affair, she exposes Sadiq to the entire school at an assembly. Riz invites classmate Cory Wilson (Sam Retford) over to the Nawaz's house for dinner, and after he leaves, Farida discovers her expensive jewellery is missing. Alya assumes Cory stole the jewellery, but discovers that Sadiq has sold it in an attempt to save the family from bankruptcy. He loses his factory and family home, and they are forced to move in with Farida's sister.

Sadiq can no longer afford to be Ackley Bridge's sponsor, and tells Mandy to let the school be managed by the Valley Trust instead. However, he later returns to coach Ackley Bridge's new girls' rugby team. When student Kacey 'Spud' Gartside (Zara Salim) wonders about her heritage, her mother Debbie (Vicky Myers) reveals that Sadiq is her father. Alya is initially disgusted to discover that Kacey is her sister. However, when she leaves for university, she encourages Sadiq to have a relationship with Kacey and show her the same love he showed Alya.

== Casting ==
Ray had never appeared on a serious drama series prior to Ackley Bridge, but stated that he was "quite happy going straight in at the deep end". He stated that there was a large difference in the form of acting used on Ackley Bridge as opposed to Citizen Khan, a sitcom Ray stars in. He explained that on Citizen Khan, a comedy series filmed with a live studio audience, he is "playing for laughs", which causes him to "play quite big". However, he noted that with portraying Sadiq, he does not have to do this. He expressed his gratitude at getting to work with co-stars Joyner, Liz White and Arsher Ali, stating that he watched how they performed, and was "feeding off them". He said that he enjoyed filming for Ackley Bridge since it made him "think again about how [he does] things, and [made him] learn something". He added that since he created, starred in, co-wrote and co-produced Citizen Khan, it was "a very liberating and satisfying experience" to only have to act as Sadiq. He added that while it was a "real challenge", he "loved it". Ray found it "fantastic" to work with the young cast of Ackley Bridge, and opined that a number of "real stars" had been found on the series. Whilst filming for the series in Halifax, West Yorkshire, he stayed in a hotel across the road from the set. He stated that it felt "important" to have productions in locations such as Halifax, as opposed to big cities like London and Manchester. He opined that the Halifax area was not represented onscreen prior to it, and he could "feel the energy and the culture that exists there".

As Ray had spent time living in Yorkshire and Leeds, it meant that he knew the area and the demographic. He explained that in the area, the British Asians are "proud Yorkshiremen", so it "him being British Pakistani is important". Ray used his knowledge to aid his portrayal of Sadiq, stating that he wanted to inject a strong accent and being integrated into the local community into his character. He said while Sadiq is British Pakistani, he is also "a Halifax boy", and wanted this to come across to viewers in his portrayal. He praised Ackley Bridge for their diversity, and stated that whilst appearing on the series, he wanted Sadiq to connect with Asian audiences.

== Characterisation ==
Sadiq is described by Birmingham Mail as "a proud member of the community and family man", but that he has "bedded half of the valley". He "has grafted for everything he's got and is proud of what he's achieved". It is noted that he "appears to be a pillar of the community, but he has an unpleasant side". Sadiq also "enjoys other women's company", and it is stated that Farida knows of his affairs, but "turns a blind eye" as long as it does not become a scandal. Sadiq is a wealthy businessman, who has attempted to improve the local area with his ventures. Actor Ray described his character as "a local boy done well", but noted that he is "a man who's used to getting what he wants", referring to both Sadiq's personal and professional life. He opined that Sadiq invests in Ackley Bridge College for both philanthropic and self-serving reasons. He explained the statement, stating that despite being wealthy, Sadiq has "stayed in this relatively small West Yorkshire town" rather than going to a city. Ray believed this is due to having a sense of loyalty to his hometown, but also because he enjoys feeling like "a king in a small castle". He added that although Sadiq has "genuine interest in making the school work, and wanting it to work for the right reasons", he is "materialistic", has "a bit of an ego", and wants to expand his empire as a businessman.

Ray believes that Sadiq's "British Asian-ness" is a large part of his identity, as well as being a "pillar of the community", which puts "certain expectations" on him. He thinks that Sadiq is a "quite complex" character, since him "striding over two different communities [...] makes him quite an interesting character". He later expanded on this when he stated that he enjoys how Sadiq can go from being "villainous and the baddie of the show" to having "genuine heart". When Sadiq was described as "middle class", Ray refuted the label. He explained that he sees Sadiq as "a working class boy who's worked hard and done well". However, he admitted that he "can be quite a self absorbed, arrogant character". He added that "he's quite manipulative but there's also a well meaning side to him". Ray found it "honourable" that despite having money and "clout", Sadiq decided to invest in the school. He explained that "he could have taken over the local football club or opened up a series of restaurants", but wanted to improve the area with a school instead.

== Development ==
After Alya reveals he had sex with Mandy to the school in series one, Ray opined that Sadiq "had it coming" since it was a "terrible" thing to do. He expressed his beliefs that Sadiq's marriage to Farida "wasn't perhaps entirely of his own personal choosing", but that it was a result of his father or the community. He stated that this could have been the explanation for his affair with Mandy, and that while it "doesn't justify it", it gives it "some understanding". Despite the reputation damage Alya caused him, "he survived it" and tries to make amends in series two. After Sadiq and Mandy's sexual encounter, Ray was asked if there is still "something between them". He stated that while "what did happen, of course, will always be there", there is no longer any romantic feelings between the two. He explained that the success of the school means more to the characters. However, he added: "if they weren’t at the school then maybe they would have carried on. But never say never." After Sadiq loses his factory and family home, Ray was asked how Sadiq copes with "losing everything". He replied that it is "really distressing" for anyone to lose their job, but especially for Sadiq, since he is "very success driven". He noted that it is "time for him to take stock", and that be learns to depend on the people around him, such as Farida, "who really supports him", and Mandy. Ray opined that the losses had made Sadiq "realise what's important", and hinted that we will see how he works through the financial issues in further episodes. He touched on Sadiq's relationship with Alya, who had grown up idolising her father but recently begins to doubt him. Ray stated that Sadiq "uses his downfall" to help Alya and to repair their relationship, which he felt is a "positive thing" for his character to do.

== Reception ==
Following the premiere of the first episode, Birmingham Mail wrote that viewers "loved" Ray. Viewers stated that he was "rocking" Ackley Bridge, and that while it was strange to see him in a more dramatic and serious role, it was a positive change. Shout Out UK described Ray as "excellent". In 2018, Ray tweeted that he had received his "first vaguely positive tweet", but joked that he will "take it" since he plays a "baddie".
