= Emma Keane =

Emma Keane may refer to:

- Emma Keane (Ackley Bridge), fictional character from the British school drama
- Emma Keane (The Bill), fictional character from the British police procedural television series
