= Steve Bell (Ackley Bridge) =

Fictional character from Ackley Bridge

- Ackley Bridge character
- First appearance: Episode 1; 7 June 2017
- Last appearance: Episode 18; 21 August 2018
- Portrayed by: Paul Nicholls

In-universe information
- Full name: Steven Bell
- Occupation: PE teacher
- Spouse: Mandy Carter (wife)
- Significant other: Claire Butterworth
- Children: Zak Bell (son); Oliver Carter (son)

Steve Bell is a fictional character from the Channel 4 school drama Ackley Bridge, portrayed by Paul Nicholls. Steve first appeared in the pilot episode of the series, first broadcast on 7 June 2017. Steve was initially introduced as the PE teacher of the fictional Ackley Bridge college and his storylines in the series have included his previous affair with Claire Butterworth (Kimberly Walsh), the breakdown of his marriage to Mandy Carter (Jo Joyner), helping student Jordan Wilson (Samuel Bottomley) prove he isn't the father of Candice Murgatroyd's (Emily Pyzer) child, and trying to start a rugby team for the school. Nicholls left the role in 2018, with the character making his final appearance in the final episode of series 2, broadcast on 21 August 2018.

When Nicholls auditioned for Steve, he was impressed by the script, which he noted had funny dialogue. Steve is shown to be a "charismatic man's man", and "a big presence at Ackley Bridge College". He is "well-liked" by both students and teachers and is "always on hand to break up a fight or settle a discussion". His relationship with Mandy is referred to as "very back and forth" and that the two have obstacles to overcome.

== Storylines ==
Steve is introduced as a PE teacher of the multicultural academy school Ackley Bridge, a newly formed school built from the merging of a majority-white school and a majority-Asian school. Steve is married to headteacher Mandy Carter (Jo Joyner). Their marriage is strained from Steve previously having had an affair with netball teacher Claire Butterworth (Kimberley Walsh), whom he also has a son with.

When Jordan Wilson (Samuel Bottomley) is accused of being the father of Candice Murgatroyd's (Emily Pyzer) child, Steve helps Jordan buy a paternity test to help him disprove the allegations. When Mandy begins working with school sponsor Sadiq Nawaz (Adil Ray), Steve becomes wary that she will have an affair, particularly because of their history. Mandy later reveals that she has had sex with Sadiq, and the pair eventually agree to continue their marriage. During an open night for the school, Sadiq's daughter Alya (Maariah Hussain) exposes the affair to the school's sponsors.

When student Cory Wilson (Sam Retford) is nervous about a rugby match against his friend Riz Nawaz (Nohail Mohammed), Steve encourages him by saying "Destroy him". Cory accidentally breaks Riz's neck in a tackle, and Steve is blamed for the accident. He is accused of inciting violence, and an investigation is opened to see if he can teach. Mandy tries to stay neutral due to her personal connection to Steve, and he feels she is being unsupportive. After Steve is suspended from his job, Claire tries to make a move but is rejected. Mandy later informs Steve that she is pregnant with his baby, and he proposes getting back together to support the child. However, Mandy tells him that despite their love for each other, they are too incompatible. Steve is replaced by Hassan Hussein (Hareet Deol) when the Valley Trust takes over Ackley Bridge College.

== Development ==
Paul Nicholls's casting as Steve was announced on 26 May 2017. Nicholls was attracted to the role due to the script, which he noted had comedy that made him laugh. Nicholls was also excited to work alongside Jo Joyner again as the two previously appeared on Candy Cabs together. Both portrayed characters on EastEnders, Joe Wicks and Tanya Branning, respectively. Prior to accepting the role, Nicholls had not had a role for two years, and he explained that he sometimes feels he has to take a job purely for the payment. However, he stated this role was different, and that he was "lucky" to come across Ackley Bridge. When Nicholls was taking his nephews to school, he saw his former music teacher and asked if he could observe a year 11 class, in order to portray a teacher accurately. He stated that he "got a lot out of it". When asked how he finds working with the teenagers on the series, Nicholls stated that he finds it "hilarious", and the experience makes him feel 16 again. Nicholls left the role after Series 2 for unknown reasons.

Steve is described as a "charismatic man's man", and it is noted that he has "a big presence at Ackley Bridge College". He is "well-liked" by both students and teachers and is "always on hand to break up a fight or settle a discussion". Steve is less of a "career teacher" than Mandy since he sometimes breaks the rules for the interest of the students. Steve is also "particularly good at working with kids, especially those from challenging backgrounds". Talking about his character, actor Nicholls opined that Steve is "an old school PE teacher" who is "stuck in the 1990s". Nicholls based his portrayal of Steve on his own PE teacher, who he described as a "bit tough". Nicholls also asked his music teacher if he could observe a teacher doing their job teaching to help understand how teachers talk to students. He also researched schools around Oldham, Blackburn, and Burnley, surprised that they merged like Ackley Bridge College. He stated that he "personally wouldn't have [Steve] as a friend", and that Steve is not his "cup of tea". He explained that Steve is "a bit rough and ready, a bit of a lad's lad", and very different to him in real life. He stated that he is "still very much a kid himself inside", despite not looking like it. He said that Steve "has a bit of a temper on him", and accredited his actions to having "too many feelings", adding that he is not s "bad guy". Nicholls then touched upon Steve not being a "career teacher". He explains that due to coming from a working-class background, Steve is not concerned with "public image", as he understands certain aspects of the student's lives. He added that Steve can see aspects of himself in certain children. Nicholls stated that this is why Steve became a teacher, and opined that he is "very good" at his job. Nicholls described Steve's relationship with Mandy as "very back and forth" since they have "issues and obstacles to overcome". Steve sometimes feels emasculated as Mandy is his boss, with her "relentless ambition" being the source of many of the couple's arguments. Despite this, he states that there is love in their relationship, and Steve "likes that she's a strong woman". The pair eventually separate, and Nicholls explained that there will always be "such a physical attraction and an emotional connection between them" that makes them gravitate towards each other. He hinted that the pair could only stay together for a limited amount of time as they struggle to "make it work".

== Reception ==
Louis Hindle of Fan Prejudice called Steve's character "lovely", praising the character's dedication to his job and the fact that he avoids being a "stereotypical tough guy" like other male teachers in the series. He also called Steve's relationship with Jordan Wilson "touching", like many other teacher-student dynamics of the series.
