= Robyn Cara =

British actress

- Education: Birmingham School of Acting
- Occupation: Actress
- Years active: 2016–present

Robyn Cara (born 2 August) is a British actress from Northamptonshire. On television, she is known for her roles in the Apple TV+ series Trying (2020–2022), the Channel 4 comedy-drama Ackley Bridge (2021–2022), the Sky Max series The Rising (2022), the Netflix series Bodkin (2024) and the USA Network series The Rainmaker (2025–). Her films include Doctor Jekyll (2023).

== Early life ==
Cara grew up in a small village in Northamptonshire. She joined the National Youth Theatre and graduated from the Birmingham School of Acting (now the Royal Birmingham Conservatoire).

== Career ==
Upon graduating from drama school, Cara made her professional stage debut as Hero in Much Ado About Nothing at the Mercury Theatre, Colchester. This was followed by roles in The Importance of Being Earnest at the Theatr Clwyd, Anya Reiss's adaptation of Oliver Twist at Regent's Park Open Air Theatre in London, and The Be All & End All at York Theatre Royal. Cara starred as Leonie in Ambreen Razia's BBC Three comedy pilot Hounslow Diaries in 2018 with Razia and Mandeep Dhillon. She made her feature film debut in the 2019 direct-to-video action film We Die Young as Rincon's (David Castañeda) sister Gabriela.

In 2020, Cara landed her first major television roles when she began playing Jen in the Apple TV+ comedy Trying and also appeared in the BBC One miniseries Life as Kat. The following year, Cara joined the cast of the Channel 4 school comedy-drama Ackley Bridge for its fourth series as Kayla Afzal. She reprised her role as Kayla for its fifth and final series in 2022. She returned to the stage in Playfight at the Finborough Theatre. Also in 2022, Cara starred as Katie Sands in the Sky Max supernatural series The Rising and featured in the BBC Three horror series Red Rose as Alyssa Penrose, who dies in the first episode. In 2023, Cara starred in the horror film Doctor Jekyll.

Cara gained further prominence through her role as Emmy Sizergh in the 2024 Netflix series Bodkin. For her performance, Cara was nominated for a Gotham Television Award. Then in 2025, she had a role as Kelly Riker in the USA Network series The Rainmaker, an adaptation of the John Grisham novel of the same title.

== Personal life ==
Cara has dyslexia.

== Filmography ==
=== Film ===
Key
†	Denotes films that have not yet been released

Year	Title	Role	Notes
2019	We Die Young	Gabriela	Direct-to-video
2023	Doctor Jekyll	Maeve	
TBA	Land of Legend †	Daria	

=== Television ===
Year	Title	Role	Notes
2018	Hounslow Diaries	Leonie	
2020	Life	Kat	Miniseries, 4 episodes
2020–2022	Trying	Jen	Main role
2021–2022	Ackley Bridge	Kayla Afzal	Main role (series 4–5)
2022	The Rising	Katie Sands	8 episodes
2022	Red Rose	Alyssa Penrose	2 episodes
2024	Bodkin	Emmy Sizergh	Main role
2025	The Rainmaker	Kelly Riker	Main role
2026	Number 10 †		Upcoming series
2026	The Baddies †	Girl (voice)	Upcoming animated short story

== Stage ==
Year	Title	Role	Notes
2016	Much Ado About Nothing	Hero	Mercury Theatre, Colchester
2017	The Importance of Being Earnest	Cecily	Theatr Clwyd, Mold
2017	Oliver Twist	Agnes / Rose	Regent's Park Open Air Theatre, London
2018	The Be All & End All	Frida	York Theatre Royal, York
2021	Playfight	Zainab	Finborough Theatre, London
