= Emma Keane (Ackley Bridge) =

Fictional character from Ackley Bridge

- Ackley Bridge character
- First appearance: Episode 1; 7 June 2017
- Last appearance: Episode 20; 25 June 2019
- Portrayed by: Liz White

In-universe information
- Occupation: English teacher
- Spouse: Nik Voyle (divorced)
- Significant others: Samir Qureshi; Will Simpson
- Children: Chloe Voyle (daughter)

Emma Keane is a fictional character from the Channel 4 school drama Ackley Bridge, portrayed by Liz White. Emma first appeared in the pilot episode of the series, first broadcast on 7 June 2017. She is introduced as an English teacher at the fictional Ackley Bridge College. Her storylines in the series include her tumultuous relationship with daughter Chloe Voyle (Fern Deacon), supporting student Missy Booth (Poppy Lee Friar) through her life struggles and having an affair with colleague Samir Qureshi (Arsher Ali).

When White went in for her audition, she did not believe that she would be cast as Emma, thinking that people would not be able to envisage her in the role. She auditioned regardless and was happy to have been cast in Ackley Bridge due to liking its subject matter, specifically for its representation of multicultural societies. Emma is shown to be a "strong minded, strong willed and fun" teacher who is not afraid to fight the school system. White was appreciative that her character was not a typical teacher or mother and noted that Emma's journey with motherhood is not often depicted in media. Across her tenure, Emma fights for the students to enjoy and to progress during their time in her class, due to wanting to improve the area she grew up in.

== Storylines ==
After having shaved her legs in the taxi, Emma arrives at Ackley Bridge College for her first day in flip-flops due to running late. She arrives late to headteacher Mandy Carter's (Jo Joyner) staff meeting, who is a friend from her previous school. She also meets Samir Qureshi (Arsher Ali), with whom she had a relationship whilst at university. Mandy oversees her English lesson, where Emma's daughter Chloe Voyle (Fern Deacon) shows up drunk and vomits in her classroom. Chloe informs her that her father Nik (Stuart Manning) no longer wants to care for her, and when Emma plans for her to go back to Nik and scolds her for getting drunk, Chloe posts a photo of Emma topless on social media. She is called in by Mandy, who informs her that the image has damaged the reputation of the school. Chloe apologises for posting the photo to spite Emma, who explains that she felt she would not be good at motherhood.

Emma worries about student Missy Booth (Poppy Lee Friar), who she knows from a previous school. When Missy acts strangely at school, Emma questions her, and Missy asks her for a large sum of money. She explains that her grandmother has died, but asks her not to inform social services, otherwise her sister Hayley (Cody Ryan) will be put into foster care. Emma affirms that she has a responsibility to tell social services, but waits until they have cremated her grandmother. When the Booth family have a hearing for Hayley's custody, she tries to attend, but Mandy stops her from doing so. Chloe begins to feel neglected by Emma, since she is paying a lot of attention to Missy. She then reveals to Emma that she has a boyfriend who is over 30. Emma goes to Chloe's boyfriend's place of work and exposes him for dating a teenager. Emma learns that Samir is engaged to Maryam (Kiran Landa/Meryl Fernandes), but the pair begin an affair regardless. When Samir marries Maryam, they continue their affair, with him promising he will tell Maryam. When on his way to tell her, Samir is stabbed, and Emma takes time from work to deal with her grief. She tries to find the man responsible for his death, but is unsuccessful in doing so. When the Valley Trust take over Ackley Bridge College, Emma is replaced by Martin Evershed (Rob James-Collier) and moves away. She returns to the town after hearing Missy has died, to attend a ceremony for her.

== Casting and characterisation ==
Actress Liz White said that she did not believe she would be picked to play Emma, thinking that people would not envisage her in the role. She recalled that when she went in for her audition, she felt "uninhibited" since she did not think she would get the role. She auditioned for the part regardless, since she liked that "really could go anywhere", as well as appreciating that Emma's unique journey with motherhood is not commonly represented on television. She also wanted to be involved with Ackley Bridge as she liked that it was addressing segregation in schools in the United Kingdom. White felt that from an acting perspective, it would be "a good story to tell". Having previously appeared in school drama Teachers, she noted that Ackley Bridge focused on real social issues as opposed to the prior, and noted that the series is "actually representing issues in education around the country". White enjoyed filming in Halifax, West Yorkshire, since she was born in Yorkshire. She also praised the casting of Deacon, who plays her on-screen daughter Chloe, and felt that the both of them worked well together.

Upon the announcement of Ackley Bridge's cast and characters, Emma was described as "funny, charming and great to be around", as well as being an opinionated character that has issues with being authoritative. White billed Emma as "strong minded, strong willed and fun" and noted that she is not afraid to fight the school system. The Halifax Courier described Emma as a funny thrill seeker, as well as an inspiring and original teacher who "tends to make it up as she goes along". On her backstory, White said that Emma grew up in the Ackley Bridge area and returns due to having a strong social conscience and wanting to help the children in an area she is from. Her backstory also involves getting pregnant with Chloe in her first year of university, therefore delaying her degree to give birth. Chloe's father Nik has had custody of Chloe for the majority of her life, with Emma only seeing her for one weekend a month and half the school holidays. Despite loving her daughter, the Royal Television Society noted that Emma loves having her own freedom from motherhood. After having her daughter, Emma went travelling. Also at university, Emma had a relationship with Samir; the pair are "shocked and surprised" when they are reacquainted at Ackley Bridge College. White described their relationship as "love's young dream gone wrong". Yorkshire Live wrote that Emma "gets the surprise of her life" when she discovers the pair will be working together.

== Development ==
White explained that when the viewers are first introduced to Emma, she has just returned from a holiday to find her daughter at her school. Emma is "overwhelmed" by Chloe appearing at the school and White said that it immediately shows viewers that Emma's life is "unconventional" and she is not a "full time mum". White appreciated that since children are typically placed with the mother when a couple split up, it was different in Emma's case. White admitted that she would like her character to embrace motherhood and to "forge a really good bond with her daughter". She felt that it would help Emma, opining that she is often depicted as a character who is always searching for a love interest to fill the emotional gap in her life. White thought that this should instead be filled by Chloe, and explained: "she's got this beautiful, smart, witty daughter right in front of her that she doesn't invest in as much as she could, and so I'd love to see that explored." Channel 4 stated that Emma is a rebel who is shown to "go out on a limb for the kids", touching on her relationship with Missy in particular. White recalled a conversation with Friar where the pair decided off-screen that their characters had met at the school Emma previously taught at. In this backstory, Missy had various issues in her home life which Emma was aware of, which leads to Emma having "a vested interest in Missy coming back to education" at Ackley Bridge College. On Emma's relationship with headteacher Mandy, White explained that they were initially both teachers on the same level of authority prior to the programme's beginning point. However, in Ackley Bridge, Mandy is the headteacher, which leads to a power struggle between the two. White said that her character is not interested in a management position, but a conflict arises when Mandy "has to steer Emma in line with the way she wants the school to be". Emma "doesn't always agree with Mandy’s approach", and when Mandy limits struggling students from non-core subjects, this leads to a disagreement. White explained: "Emma thinks that if a student's only good subject is drama, and you stop them from doing it, what's that going to do to their self-esteem. So she encourages the students to speak up for themselves, and go and let their feelings be known to Mandy, which obviously Mandy doesn’t agree with!" She added that although their relationship will struggle a little bit, they will eventually "find a way through it".

Emma begins an affair with Samir, who is engaged and later gets married. White stated that although their relationship is complicated, they definitely have romantic feelings for each other. She explained that Emma makes decisions that lead her to be in a bit of a messy situation, referring to the affair as one example. When Samir is murdered, Emma becomes "hell bent on getting justice" for him. White said that he was the love of Emma's life growing up and described their relationship as "a painful love" due to their backstory where they had broken up before. His death forces Emma to realise that she had strong romantic feelings for him. The police are unable to find his murderer, which leads Emma to take action herself; White explained that since Emma is flighty, passionate and quite chaotic, it means she feels she needs to solve why he was killed. Prior to Samir's death, Emma is planning a school production of A Midsummer Night's Dream with "real momentum" since she feels it is a good idea for unity at the school. However, due to his death, White stated that Emma's commitment to her job wanes because of his death. When asked by What's on TV if her character could move on with Will, she replied that "there's a chance for real feelings to develop", but Emma will need to "decide whether to let go of the past and move on". She added that Emma needs to be sure that Will is the suitable person to move on with before she can.
