= Yasmin Al-Khudhairi =

British actress

- Born: Kingston upon Thames, Greater London, England
- Education: University of Manchester
- Occupation: Actress
- Years active: 2019–present

Yasmin Al-Khudhairi is a British actress. She is best known for her role in the final two series of the Channel 4 comedy-drama Ackley Bridge (2021–2022).

== Early life ==
Al-Khudhairi was born in Kingston upon Thames, South West London, to Iraqi Muslim parents. She graduated from the University of Manchester in 2016 with a Bachelor of Social Science in Social Anthropology. During university, she befriended Rishi Pelham when she auditioned for one of his plays.

== Career ==
Having met director and writer Rishi Pelham at university and worked with him on a number of fringe theatre projects, Al-Khudhairi was cast by Pelham as Ayala in his 2019 independent dance film Hilda, marking Al-Khudhairi's professional screen acting debut. This was followed by her television debut with a minor guest appearance in a 2020 episode of the BBC thriller Killing Eve.

In 2021, Al-Khudhairi starred in the television film version of the biographical play Adam, opposite the titular Adam Kashmiry as himself, for the National Theatre of Scotland, and the BBC. Later that year, she landed her first main television role when she joined the cast of the Channel 4 school comedy-drama Ackley Bridge for its fourth series as Fizza Akhtar. She would reprise her role as Fizza for its fifth and final series in 2022.

In 2023, Al-Khudhairi appeared in the romantic comedy film Rye Lane and had a recurring role as Princess Yadira in the third series of the Sky Max political thriller COBRA. The following year, she began playing Naomi Ward in the BBC Three adaptation of A Good Girl's Guide to Murder. Al-Khudhairi has a role as Zahra in the 2026 BBC One house share sitcom Bill's Included.

== Filmography ==
=== Film ===
Year	Title	Role	Notes
2019	Hilda	Ayala	
2023	Rye Lane	Amanda	

=== Television ===
Year	Title	Role	Notes
2020	Killing Eve	Shop Assistant	1 episode
2021	Adam	Egyptian Adam	Television film
2021–2022	Ackley Bridge	Fizza Akhtar	Main role (series 4–5)
2021	Stath Lets Flats	Lydia	1 episode
2023	COBRA	Princess Yadira Al-Bilal	3 episodes
2024–present	A Good Girl's Guide to Murder	Naomi Ward	Main role
2025	How Are You? It's Alan (Partridge)	Lara	1 episode
2026	Bill's Included	Zahra	
