= Shout Out UK =

UK literacy enterprise

- Abbreviation: SOUK
- Formation: 2011; 15 years ago or 2012; 14 years ago
- Purpose: Political literacy, media literacy, student journalism, student government, youth empowerment
- Headquarters: Notting Hill, London
- Location: United Kingdom
- Method: EdTech, Education, Youth voice
- Key people: Matteo Bergamini (CEO)
- Website: www.shoutoutuk.org

Shout Out UK (SOUK) is a non-partisan social enterprise, based in the United Kingdom. Its mission is to strengthen democracy by providing training and programmes on media literacy and political literacy.

Shout Out UK was formed in August 2015 by Matteo Bergamini, whilst studying at Brunel University in Uxbridge. Shout Out UK have gained media attention for running the 2015 Youth Leaders' Debate, in partnership with Channel 4 and their collaboration with UK Drill artist Drillminister to encourage young people to vote in the 2019 general election. The New Statesman have named Shout Out UK's political literacy course as one of the methods to revive political education in the UK.

== Youth Leaders Debate ==
Shout Out UK partnered with Channel 4 to hold a debate between the youth leaders of the seven major British political parties in front of a studio audience, ahead of the 2015 general election. It was held on 28 April 2015 and live streamed on All4. It received wide media coverage, and was trending on Twitter after 10 minutes of the programme airing.

The debate, hosted by Fatima Manji from Channel 4 News, differed from the main 2015 leaders debate by introducing buzzers. Seven themes were presented to the participants; each had one chance to 'buzz in' and have one minute protected time for one question only. Representatives from all the major UK political parties took part.

== Political literacy ==
After winning a local business competition called 'The Harrow Business Den 2016'. Shout Out UK's work shifted to media literacy and political literacy training programmes in schools and colleges.

Shout Out UK's political literacy course covers an introduction to the politics of the United Kingdom, international relations (including brief overviews of the European Union, NATO and United Nations), media literacy, debating and public speaking. The course ends with a Speech Night, during which students deliver speeches on issues they are passionate about in front of their parents/carers and local/regional/national politicians hosted at the school. The organisation aims to enhance students’ ability to influence local policymaking, to engage in activism and to build their overall Emotional Resilience and Confidence.

With the decline of citizenship education and no GCSE on Government and Politics, the political literacy course was noted by journalists at the New Statesman and National Student as signalling a revival of political education in schools. Shout Out UK was awarded the Harrow Business Den award in 2016. Due to its work in schools, Shout Out UK's founder Matteo Bergamini was asked to give oral evidence to the House of Lords Citizenship and Civic Engagement Committee, alongside Voter Registration charity Bite The Ballot that led to the report 'The Ties that Bind'.

== National democracy week ==
On the 5 July 2018, Shout Out UK ran an event to ‘hack’ the problem Parliament has with the lack of representation of women, particularly those who are BAME or LGBTQ+. Despite 2018 marking the centenary of some women being allowed to vote, only 32 per cent of the House of Commons identifying as female that year.

The event was hosted by Alexis Wieroniey, an American comedian and women's rights activist. Speakers included Milly Evans; founder of Our Progress Project, Valerie Vaz, the Shadow Leader of the House of Commons and Andrea Leadsom the then leader of the House of Commons.

== PoliFest 2019 ==
On 25 June 2019, Shout Out UK hosted #PoliFest, a festival bringing together politicians and young people to play sports and debate politics at Brunel University. PoliFest aimed to bring politicians and young people together through playing sport and to break down the barriers between Britain's youth and the ‘Westminster Bubble’. The event was attended by both young people and politicians from across different political parties, including MPs Johnny Mercer, Nigel Huddleston and Tom Brake amongst others.

== #NoVoteNoVoice & Political Drillin ==
For the 2019 General Election, Shout Out UK partnered with Drillminister, a UK Drill music artist who first appeared on Channel 4 News for his track entitled 'Political Drillin'. Drillminister and Shout Out UK created a campaign, entitled #NoVoteNoVoice, to encourage young people to register to vote and ultimately vote. The collaboration involved the creation of a track and music video entitled 'Peoples Vote'. The track was released on the YouTube channel Mixtap Madness. It later featured on SBTV and UniLad Sound.

The project ended with a concert held at Fairfield hall in Croydon on the final night before voter registration closed. That day it was estimated that over 600,000 people registered to vote, including over 250,000 under 25s.

== Pathways ==
In 2025, SOUK released a game called Pathways emphasizing the "Prevent" aspect of the Home Office's CONTEST counter-terrorism strategy. The "Pathways Learning Package" was marketed as a free learning package for "Navigating Gaming, The Internet & Extremism". SOUK developed it in coordination with the East Riding of Yorkshire Council and the Hull City Council. It stars a male or female (Note: The player can choose whether Charlie appears as a male or female, with both designs being shown on the game's landing page. The in-game text largely uses "they/them" pronouns.) protagonist named Charlie who is courted by a nationalist teenage girl with purple hair named Amelia from Bridlington.

Pathways was described by The Daily Telegraph and The Spectator as "clumsy" and "overtly manipulative." Critics argued that by directing players to report characters for "extreme Right-wing ideology" when questioning immigration policies, the game essentially suppressed free speech through the threat of "Prevent" referrals. The controversy was heightened on social media after the British online right co-opted the character of Amelia, who had been intended to be an antagonist and a cautionary figure regarding far-right radicalisation, and began sharing AI-generated images and videos where her nationalist and anti-immigrant beliefs were depicted in a more positive light compared to her original in-game version or where her "cute goth girl" persona was generally used as a symbol of opposition to mass immigration and to the policy positions of Keir Starmer's government. Reacting to the game's new-found notoriety, SOUK's Matteo Bergamini said that Pathways was never meant to be used in isolation but rather in combination with a suite of teaching resources, (Note: While an accompanying teacher's guide to the game does have a list of free and paid resources on its last few pages, said teacher's guide is the only additional resource that is directly accessible from the game's landing page.) and that the nature of the game had been misrepresented; "[it] does not state, for example, that questioning mass migration is inherently wrong." Bergamini also said that the game was still receiving positive feedback from its intended end-users.

== See also ==
- Elections in the United Kingdom
- Politics of the United Kingdom
