= Goldy Notay =

- Born: Punjab, India
- Occupation: Actress
- Years active: 2002–present

Goldy Notay is a British-Canadian film, television and stage actress. She played 'Roopi' as the lead role in the Gurinder Chadha film It's A Wonderful Afterlife. She has appeared as Shireen in the Mike Bartlett drama The Town and Amar Akbar & Tony a comedy Brit flick on Netflix. She is currently in the 6 part ITV series Beecham House, directed by Gurinder Chadha.

== Early life ==
Goldy was born in the Punjab. She later moved to Canada and finally settled in London

She speaks Punjabi and English.

== Career ==
After completing drama school in Toronto, Canada, Goldy was spotted by director Mira Nair while performing on stage at the Tarragon Theatre. She was offered the role of a pre Med student opposite Naveen Andrews in the feature My Own Country. She subsequently moved to the UK and worked extensively with Kali theatre group specialising in stories by Asian Women.

She is best known for her role as Roopi in It's A Wonderful Afterlife. Roopi was written with her in mind by the writer/director Gurinder Chadha after she saw her perform in a play.

It's A Wonderful Afterlife was a British feature film where she worked with the director of Bend it like Beckham, Gurinder Chadha who cast a range of British and Indian actors, including Shabana Azmi, Sally Hawkins, Sendhil Ramamurthy and Zoë Wanamaker. She gained two stone (28 pounds) for the role of Roopi which she promptly lost to appear with Sarah Jessica Parker in Sex and the City 2 This was a challenge for the actress who is described as "quite an organic-loving, gym-going kind of girl".

== Selected filmography ==
Year	Film/TV	Role	Notes
2010	It's a Wonderful Afterlife	Roopi	Film
2010	Sex and the City 2	Basimah	Film
2011	Beloved	Nandita	Film
2012	The Town	Shireen	TV series
2013	Warehouse 13	Beatrice	TV series
2015	Amar Akbar & Tony	Sonia	Film
2019	Beecham House	Bindu	TV series
2021	Ackley Bridge	Miriam Akhtar	Recurring role; fourth series
