= Dark Harvest =

Dark Harvest may refer to:

- Dark Harvest, novel by Karen Harper 2004
- Dark Harvest (novel), a 2007 novel by Norman Partridge
  - Dark Harvest (2023 film), a horror film adaptation of the 2007 novel
- Dark Harvest, an Illinois-based publisher of Night Visions (stories) and other horror fiction
- Dark Harvest (2004 film), a low-budget slasher movie
- Dark Harvest (2016 film), a Canadian pot movie
- "Dark Harvest", an episode of the animated series Invader Zim (2001)
- Dark Harvest Commando 1981 militant group
