= Dark Harvest (novel) =

2006 horror novel by Norman Partridge

- 2007 edition, published by Tor Books
- Author: Norman Partridge
- Language: English
- Genre: Fiction
- Published: 2006
- Publisher: Cemetery Dance Publications
- Publication place: United States
- Pages: 176

Dark Harvest is a 2006 horror novel by Norman Partridge. The book is set in a hamlet where its young men must confront a creature each year in the hopes that they will win a desirable prize.

A film adaptation of the novel was released in 2023.

== Synopsis ==
The novel is set in an unnamed Midwestern hamlet, where each year, all of the young men take part in a yearly ritual in which they hunt a giant pumpkin-headed creature that arises from the corn, known as both "Sawtooth Jack" and the "October Boy". They are tasked with catching the creature before it makes it to the hamlet's church, which it must do before midnight, in order to win the ordeal. Girls are forbidden from participating or being outside during the hunt. The winner of the hunt receives the ability to leave the hamlet – something not otherwise possible – and his family is given a new home, a car, and a year free from bills. Winners are frequently idolized, and last year's winner, Jim Shepard, is no exception.

Unbeknownst to the participants, the truth behind the ritual is far darker than what they would expect. While the winner's family does receive their prizes, the winning boy is killed and in turn resurrected the following year as the new creature, a gnarled monster with a pumpkin head. Dan Shepard, Jim's father, is forced to carve a face for the creature and then later, persuade the creature to let itself be caught, if it does happen to make it to the church by midnight. Many of the town's fathers, as part of the Harvester's Guild, are aware of the truth of the ritual but still allow their sons to take part. This year, the October Boy is determined that it will be the last year for the ritual.

Ultimately, the October Boy manages to make it to the church, with the help of some of the local teens, where he finds that his father has died by suicide. He also comes face-to-face with the hamlet's lawman, Jerry Ricks, who is determined that the ritual continue. Ricks's attempts are for naught, as he is shot and killed. The church and surrounding buildings are then set ablaze by the October Boy as the townspeople flee, now able to freely leave the hamlet.

== Release ==
Dark Harvest was first released in a limited edition, signed hardback in October 2006. The following year Tor Books issued the novel in e-book and paperback format.

== Reception ==
Publishers Weekly named it one of the 100 best books of the year. A reviewer for Dread Central was critical, writing that "the author forgot to tie up a lot of loose ends, for example why the entire town is in lock-down in the first place and dependent on the massacre of its perennial monster." The reviewer for The Austin Chronicle was more favorable, as they felt that "The only weakness is Partridge's insistence at times to intentionally use a distracting second-person narrative. That is but a small complaint."

=== Awards ===
- Bram Stoker Award for Best Long Fiction (2006, won)

== Film adaptation ==
New Regency optioned the film rights, with Matt Tolmach to produce, but was sold to Metro-Goldwyn-Mayer in April 2020 after New Regency put the film in turnaround. The film stars newcomers Casey Likes and E'myri Crutchfield in the lead roles, and was released by MGM in 2023, with a screenplay by Michael Gilio.
