= Angel Rodriguez (film) =

2005 American television film

- DVD cover
- Written by: Jim McKay; Hannah Weyer
- Directed by: Jim McKay
- Starring: Jonan Everett; Rachel Griffiths
- Country of origin: United States
- Original language: English

Production
- Producer: Paul S. Mezey
- Cinematography: Chad Davidson
- Editor: Alexander Hall
- Running time: 87 minutes

Original release
- Release: September 15, 2005

Angel Rodriguez is a 2005 American television film, that showed at the Toronto International Film Festival under the title Angel. HBO picked up the film and released it under the longer name both on their movie channel and on DVD.

== Premise ==
Angel (Jonan Everett) is a troubled teen in Brooklyn, New York, who is homeless after being kicked out by his father. He is—for a while—taken in by a kind-hearted social worker (Rachel Griffiths) who has her own problems.

He later tries to find support and shelter with friends from his school, and eventually attempting to find a way to get by on his own.

== Reception ==
On review aggregator website Rotten Tomatoes, the film holds an approval rating of 83% based on 6 reviews, with an average rating of 6.6/10.
