= Fear (Of the Unknown) (Grey's Anatomy) =

- Grey's Anatomy episode
- Cristina Yang (Sandra Oh) and Meredith Grey (Ellen Pompeo) dance it out one last time.
- Episode no.: Season 10; Episode 24
- Directed by: Tony Phelan
- Written by: William Harper
- Original air date: May 15, 2014
- Running time: 43 minutes

Episode chronology
← Previous "Everything I Try to Do, Nothing Seems to Turn Out Right"	Next → "I Must Have Lost it on the Wind"
- Grey's Anatomy season 10

"Fear (Of the Unknown)" is the twenty-fourth episode and the season finale of the tenth season of the American television medical drama Grey's Anatomy, and is the 220th episode overall. It aired on May 15, 2014, on ABC in the United States. The episode was written by Shonda Rhimes and William Harper and directed by Tony Phelan. On its initial airing, it was watched by 8.92 million viewers. The episode marked the departure of one of the lead characters, Cristina Yang, played by Sandra Oh since the inception of the series in 2005. The episode focuses on Yang as she prepares to say her goodbyes to the doctors at Grey-Sloan Memorial hospital, including her "person" Meredith Grey (Ellen Pompeo), her long-time friend and Meredith's husband Derek Shepherd (Patrick Dempsey) and her love interest Owen Hunt (Kevin McKidd) and leave for Zürich for her new job at the Klausman Institute for Medical Research. The episode received universal acclaim with widespread praise directed towards Oh's performance and the send-off for her character.

Amidst Yang's departure a catastrophe occurs at a nearby mall bringing loads of patients to Grey-Sloan. Derek asks Meredith to move to Washington, D.C. with her for his new job. Callie Torres (Sara Ramirez) and Arizona Robbins (Jessica Capshaw) consider having a surrogate mother carry their child while April Kepner (Sarah Drew) is nervous about raising her own child with Jackson Avery (Jesse Williams). Miranda Bailey (Chandra Wilson) is nominated for a position at the Hospital Board to replace Cristina, who instead left the seat for Alex Karev (Justin Chambers). Also, Leah Murphy (Tessa Ferrer) is fired from her job, Shane Ross (Gaius Charles) quits his residency at Grey-Sloan to accompany Yang to Zürich as her student and Richard Webber (James Pickens Jr.) meets with Maggie Pierce (Kelly McCreary), and finds out that her birth mother was Ellis Grey (Kate Burton).

This episode marks the final appearance of Sandra Oh as Cristina Yang and Gaius Charles as Shane Ross. It is also the final appearance of Tessa Ferrer as Leah Murphy as a series regular.

== Plot ==
The episode opens with a voice-over narration from Cristina Yang (Sandra Oh) about facing the unpredictability of life and choosing courage over fear in the face of the unknown.

The day finally arrives for Cristina to leave for Zurich, Switzerland, but her departure is delayed by a potential act of terrorism. Cristina plans to make a quick stop at the mall to buy a European phone charger, while Derek Shepherd (Patrick Dempsey) is busy handing out brochures for Washington, D.C., and Alex Karev (Justin Chambers) is contemplating buying a fancy car with his newfound wealth. Meanwhile, Miranda Bailey's (Chandra Wilson) genome lab faces closure due to funding cuts by the foundation. Just as Cristina is about to head to the mall, an explosion occurs there, sending multiple injured victims to Grey Sloan Memorial Hospital. Leah Murphy (Tessa Ferrer) returns to the ER upon hearing of the explosion, but leaves without saying goodbye after realizing all the patients have been treated.

In the midst of the chaos, April Kepner (Sarah Drew) tells Owen Hunt (Kevin McKidd) that she is pregnant, but their joy is interrupted by grim news. April receives reassurance from Catherine Avery (Debbie Allen), who gives her a pep talk about raising a baby in an increasingly dangerous world. The hospital turns into a frenzy, with decontamination zones set up for the explosion victims. Cristina, who hadn't made it to the mall, returns to help with the crisis, as does Leah. Cristina, feeling the weight of her departure, realizes she can't leave until she and Meredith Grey (Ellen Pompeo) have one last "dance it out". Shane Ross (Gaius Caesar) also approaches Cristina, declaring his desire to follow her to Zürich and continue learning under her.

During surgery, Cristina asks Alex if he truly wants to pursue private practice, reminding him of his surgical talent and quick thinking. With only two hours until her flight, Cristina prepares to assist in Link's heart transplant surgery, but Meredith steps in, telling her it's time to leave. Cristina bids goodbye to Bailey and Richard Webber (James Pickens Jr.), and agrees to take Shane with her to Switzerland, after he insists she is the one he wants to learn from. Cristina rushes to the OR gallery where Owen is operating, knocks on the glass, and waves a silent farewell.

Outside, Link's new heart arrives in a cab, but Meredith insists that Cristina get in the cab and go. When Cristina hesitates, Meredith reminds her that she loves her and urges her to leave now or risk never going. After their emotional exchange, Cristina grabs Meredith and pulls her into an on-call room for one final "dance it out". As Meredith finds a song, Cristina gives her parting advice: to call at least twice a month, to mock Alex regularly to keep him from becoming insufferable, and to take care of Owen. Cristina ends with a heartfelt plea: "Don't get on little tiny planes that can crash, or stick your hand in a body cavity with a bomb, or offer your life to a gunman. Don't be a hero. You're my person. I need you alive. You make me brave." They dance it out one last time before Cristina departs.

Meanwhile, Meredith tells Derek that she can't leave Seattle—the place where she has built her life—and decides she won't move to D.C. with him, despite his wishes. Callie Torres (Sara Ramirez) and Arizona Robbins (Jessica Capshaw) consider having a surrogate mother carry their future baby after treating a surrogate injured in the explosion. In the aftermath of Cristina's departure, Webber nominates Bailey for a position on the board, but it's revealed that Cristina left Karev her shares of the hospital and her board seat. Webber connects with Dr. Maggie Pierce (Kelly McCreary), the new head of cardiothoracic surgery, and discovers that her birth mother was Ellis Grey (Kate Burton).

== Production ==
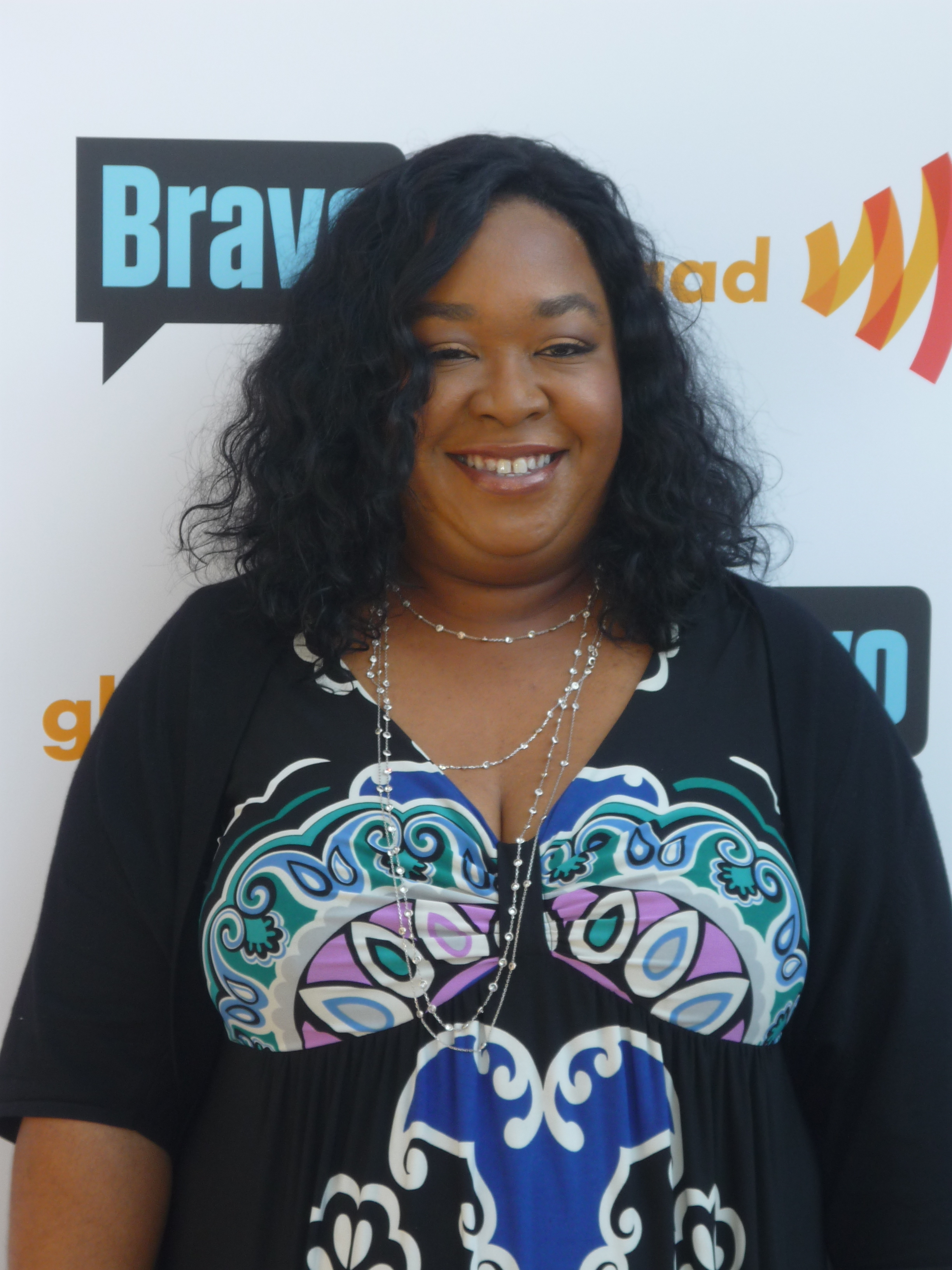
Creator Shonda Rhimes said that Oh changed the course of Grey's Anatomy with her brilliant, nuanced portrayal of Cristina Yang,

Sandra Oh announced her departure from Grey's Anatomy after Season 10, stating, "It's been a great privilege to play the character of Cristina Yang on Grey's Anatomy, and I am both sad and excited to see where this, her final season, will take her." Oh further explained, "It was an emotional and deeply creative decision for me, and I feel fully supported by Shonda Rhimes and the writers. It's so rare in an actor's life to explore and grow a character so fully, so completely. I am profoundly grateful to everyone at Grey's Anatomy for the opportunity."

Creator Rhimes responded to the announcement by saying, "Over the past 10 seasons, I have been made better by Sandra's trust, faith, and friendship, and I can't quantify how grateful I am for her collaboration on a character we both love so deeply. This year is going to be bittersweet for us—we're both going to savor every moment of Cristina Yang and then give her the exit she deserves. When Sandra walks out of my door, Grey's Anatomy will once again be forever changed."

Oh told The Hollywood Reporter, which first broke the news, "It's such an interesting thing to play a character for so long and to actually get the sense that she wants to be let go as well. Cristina wants to be let go, and I am ready to let her go." She added, "Creatively, I really feel like I gave it my all, and I feel ready to let her go."

Co-star Kevin McKidd (who plays Cristina's love interest, Owen Hunt), reflecting on Oh's exit, told The Hollywood Reporter, "Pain is sometimes close to pleasure, and there's a lot of pain here. But there will be pleasure again in exploring that."

Ellen Pompeo, who plays Oh's on-screen best friend and the show's protagonist, Meredith Grey, paid tribute on Twitter, writing, "So proud of the work we've done together @iamsandraoh," alongside a picture of the two in their Grey's Anatomy scrubs. She added, "We've laughed, we've cried, we've kicked some serious acting ass together. #SOGRATEFUL."

On April 24, Oh filmed her final scene on Grey's Anatomy and took to social media to reflect on her last day of filming, posting, "Starting the last day of shooting on Grey's with my usual mug of tea," along with a photo of a Grey's Anatomy mug. She captioned it, "A little meditation and much gratitude."

== Reception ==
=== Broadcast ===
The episode originally aired on May 15, 2014, in the United States on the American Broadcasting Company (ABC), and was watched by 8.92 million viewers. In the key 18-49 demographic, the episode ranked 10th in its time slot and 20th overall in viewership. It was also the 4th most-watched drama of the night. The episode received a 2.6/8 rating in the Nielsen ratings.

=== Reviews ===
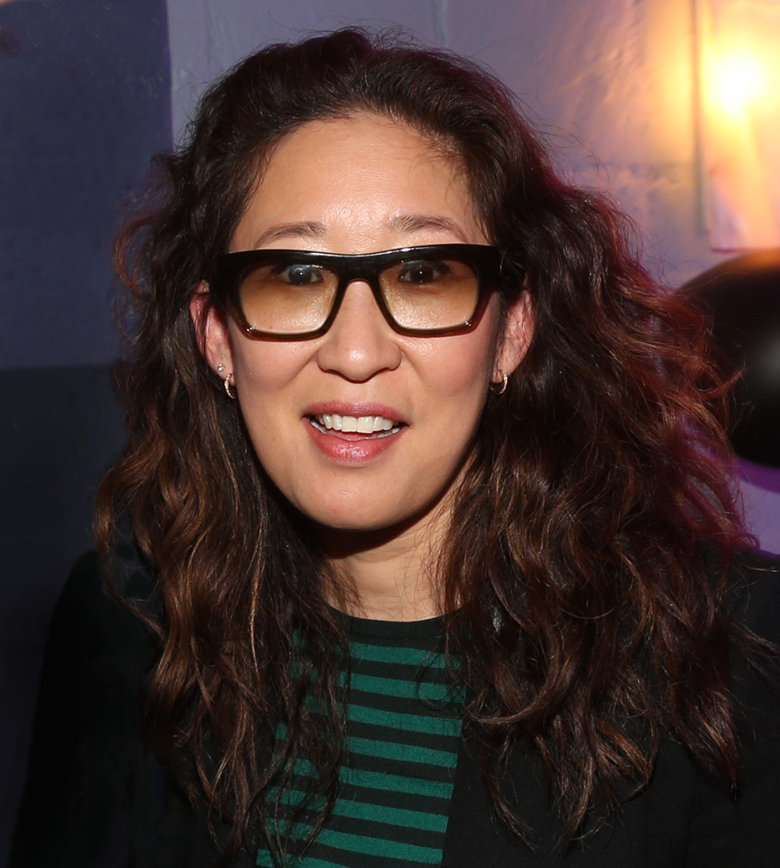
Many critics saw Sandra Oh's performance during the finale as worthy of a Primetime Emmy Award nomination.

The episode received universal acclaim, with widespread praise for Sandra Oh's performance and the send-off for her character, Cristina Yang.

The A.V. Club described the finale as "emotional", noting, "The finale was an odd combination—half-giant explosion, half-sentimental goodbye to a legendary television character. Some parts worked better than others, but compared to previous seasons, this finale was much more emotional." They also highlighted how "the show's emotional relationships can resonate strongly enough to bypass soapiness."

Wetpaint commented, "Distance from her 'persona' aside, it does seem like Cristina got her happily-ever-after now that she's in her dream job in Zürich, beholden only to her work."

TV Fanatic praised the episode, stating, "There were so many instances where I couldn't help but shed a tear or two," and added, "Overall, 'Fear (Of the Unknown)' was a moving, stressful, and emotional rollercoaster that illustrated Cristina's happy ending in such a seamless way. It was really the best way to say goodbye to Yang, and while I'm sad she's gone, I am now excited and curious to see how the show will go on without her."

Entertainment Weekly also lauded Cristina's send-off, writing, "I loved how they sent her off. It was to-the-point, she and Meredith danced it out, and it wasn’t made into too big a deal because it’s not as if she died. Then again, if this is the last we’re going to see of her, I felt it should’ve been more central to the episode, right?" The site continued, "Can we talk about how perfect that speech was? I loved the many throwbacks, particularly to Cristina's 'don't be a hero' speech to Burke during Season 2's bomb episodes. This was the Twisted Sisters' goodbye I wanted." They also praised the exit of Tessa Ferrer's character, Leah, stating, "Leah too got a nice exit, walking out of the hospital to find what she's good at."

Many critics, including Rachel Simon of Bustle and Nicole Pomarico of Wetpaint, expressed that Oh's performance during her tenth and final season on Grey's Anatomy was worthy of an Emmy nomination. Simon noted, "She made us care about Grey's in a way we hadn't in years, bringing us into Cristina's life and mind fully and ferociously. The show has been good for several seasons now; because of Oh's performance this year, it once again became great."
