= Bogdan Willewalde =

Russian artist (1819–1903)

Bogdan Pavlovich Willewalde
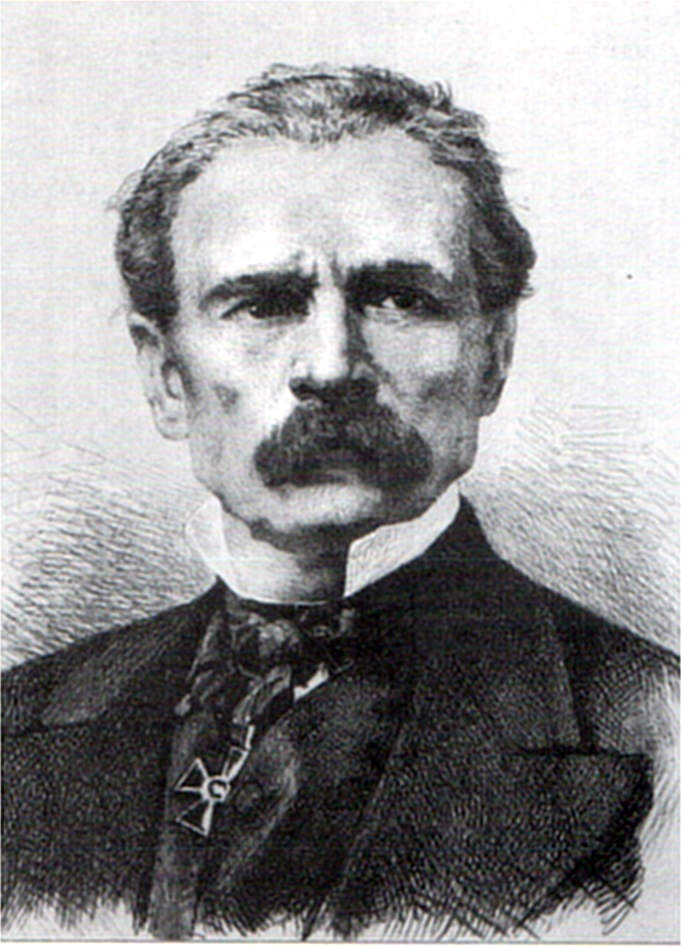
- Portrait etching by Yakov Dm. Andreev, 1910s
- Born: Gottfried Willewalde; 12 January 1819; Pavlovsk, Saint Petersburg, Russian Empire
- Died: 24 March 1903 (aged 84); Dresden, German Empire
- Education: Alexander Sauerweid; Karl Bryullov
- Alma mater: Imperial Academy of Arts (1842)
- Known for: Painting
- Movement: Academism
- Awards: Medals of the Imperial Academy of Arts: two minor (1838), major silver (1839); minor gold (1841); major gold for "Battle of Fère-Champenoise" (1842)

Gottfried Willewalde, also known as Bogdan Pavlovich Willewalde (Russian: Го́тфрид Виллева́льде, Богда́н Па́влович Виллева́льде; 12 January 1819– 24 March 1903), was a Russian painter and draughtsman of German descent, active in St. Petersburg during Tsars Nicholas I through Alexander III's reigns, best known for his military subjects.

== Early life ==
Bogdan Willewalde was born in Pavlovsk, Saint Petersburg on 12 January 1819 in a noble family of Bavarian origin. From childhood, he was acquainted with and a playmate of the Russian grand dukes and intimately connected to the Imperial family and its official hierarchy.

His initial art studies were with Jungstedt, following which he was admitted to the St Petersburg Imperial Academy of Arts in 1838. He studied under Karl Bryullov and Alexander Sauerweid. In the 1840s, having achieved success in his academic studies, he was despatched abroad – to Dresden – to train in art of the war of 1813. In 1844, he was recalled to St Petersburg upon the death of Sauerweid, to finish the latter's cycle of the Russian war against Napoleon. In 1848, he was appointed as professor in the Imperial Academy of Arts, and chair of the military arts section.

== Career ==
=== Military subjects ===
Most of the material in this section has been taken from the Encyclopedia of War edited by K. I. Velichko.

At the beginning of his artistic career, Willewalde was influenced by German masters, especially the Munich-based Peter von Hess, in the spirit of whom Willewalde painted The Battle of Gissgubel. He then became a follower of the French artist Horace Vernet, although he could not quite match the latter's ease of brush-stroke and elegance.

Willewalde's main works in this first period are the four huge canvases of the history of the Napoleonic Wars of 1813–14, which are now found in the Alexander Hall of the Winter Palace: the battles of Kulm, Leipzig, Fère-Champenoise and Paris.

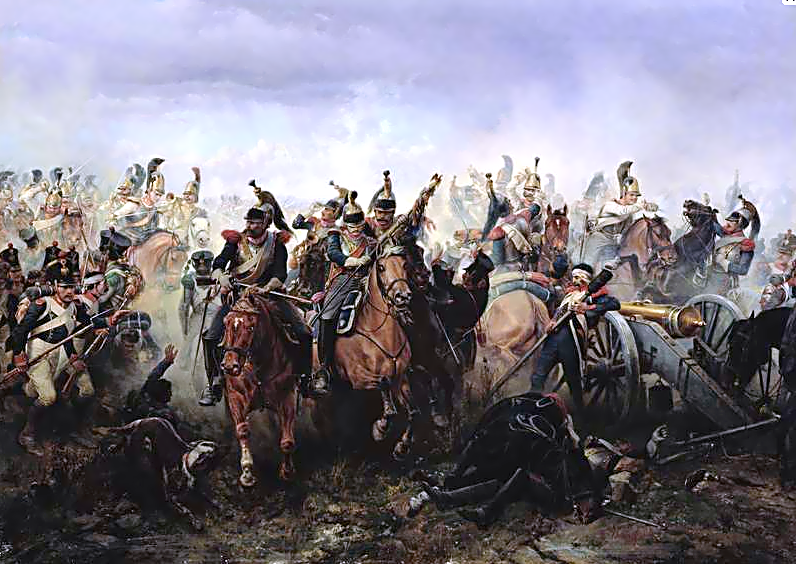
Horse Life Guards Regiment at the Battle of Fère-Champenoise on 13 March 1814, (1891), oil on canvas – Military Historical Museum of Artillery, Engineers and Signal Corps.

Willewalde joined the Russian army as well, and made sketches and etudes whilst on service, after which he would complete his monumental canvases. Having been commissioned to paint The Capture of Shamil, he travelled to the Caucasus to observe the landscape and scenery. In Dagestan, he created several hundred watercolours and sketches that today hold immense historical importance.

In the second period of his career, Willewalde turned his attention to the Polish November uprising of 1831 (painting Grokhovo and Ostrolenka), the Hungarian revolution of 1848 (painting Surrender of Görgey at Világos, Advance into Kronstadt and others), the Crimean War (Siege of Sevastopol), and the Russian conquest of the Caucasus (Bashkadyklar, Battle of Kars, Shamil at Gunib, and Surrender of Shamil).

Willewalde also painted some of the wars of the 1870s, although to a smaller extent: Gravelotte, Battle on the Danube (1877), and Departure of the Uhlans in Bulgaria.

In his final period, Willewalde returned to the era of Napoleon. The works of this period depict the everyday lives of the military, and demonstrate a new feature of his talent: a gentle humour in the depiction of military-idyllic scenes, such as in Hussar and Savoyard, Cossacks on the Rhine, Do not be afraid – we are Cossacks, They were captured, and so on.

Known for his focus on military order, Willewalde produced many images of parades and manoeuvres that do not serve as model depictions of war, such as Training the Horse Guards of the Horse Artillery.

=== Court subjects ===
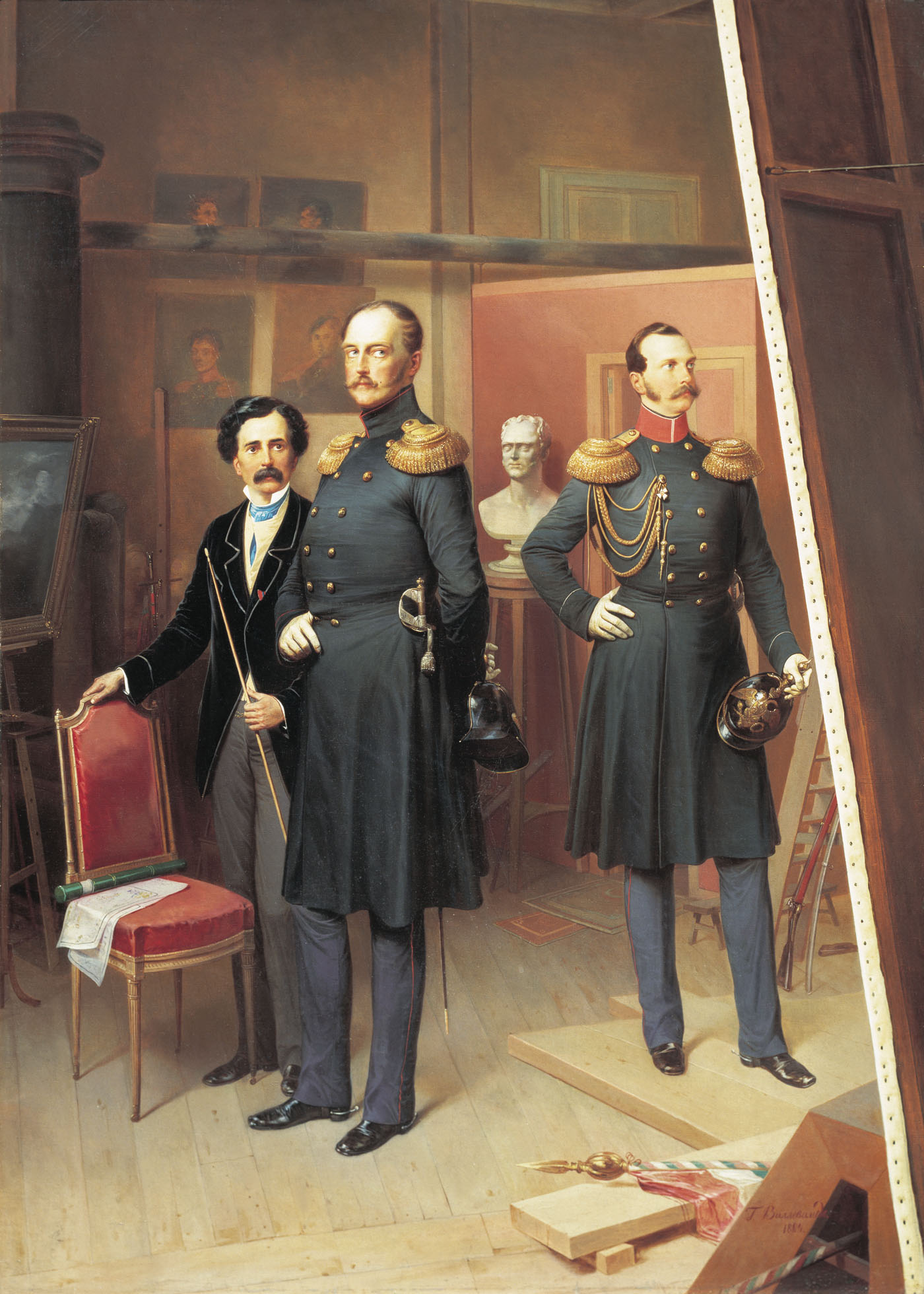
Tsar Nicholas I with Tsarevich Alexander in the artist's studio in 1854, (1884), oil on canvas, State Russian Museum.

Willewalde was held in high esteem by the Imperial court and received several commissions to depict the members of the court in various ceremonial situations. In 1859, he created a monumental canvas Ceremonial Entry of Their Imperial Majesties into Moscow before their Sacred Coronation 17 August 1859 in honour of the coronation of Czar Alexander II. Following this success, he was asked to depict the anointment of Grand Duke Nicholas as heir to the Imperial throne. The painting titled The Oath of His Imperial Highness Prince Nikolai Alexandrovich at the Georgiev Throne Hall of the Winter Palace. 8 September 1859.

Six years later, following the untimely death of the heir apparent, Willewalde was commissioned to paint the anointment of the Czar's second son, Alexander Alexandrovich, as the new heir to the Imperial throne: The Oath of His Imperial Highness the Heir Apparent Prince Alexander Alexandrovich at the Georgiev Throne Hall in the Winter Palace was produced in 1867. Almost the same faces appear in this painting as in the previous one, and the passage of time is evident in them, in particular the tired visage of the Queen Maria Alexandrovna, deeply ill since the death of her first son.

=== Academic life ===
Willewalde remained the head of the military art division of the Imperial Academy of Arts till its reform in 1893. The excellence of his teaching served to train nearly the entire following generation of Russian military artists.

Although Willewalde himself was a man of strictly-held consistent views on art and he disliked the younger generation for its various innovations, he was able not to thwart their talents. Such diverse talents as Charlemagne, Filippov, Kovalevsky, Gruzinsky, Popov, Samokysh, Mazurovsky emerged from his school.

=== Style ===
Willewalde is one of the main representatives of the dominant type of battle painting of the 19th century, combining its strengths and weaknesses. He remained dependent on the academy which at the time supported and maintained the genre of military art. There were stringent requirements of the portrayer of war, given the development of realism in art in general: accurate representation especially in the form and presentation of the participating troops; it was to reflect the official position on that war, remaining reliant on the official dispatches. Willewalde's entire oeuvre was circumscribed by these demands: accuracy, depicting the truth as represented by the Russian authorities, finely finished, but never causing worry.

Villevalde created a large-scale group portrait featuring royalty, dignitaries, military leaders, representatives of all classes of the Russian state, from the ruling elite to ordinary citizens. His monumental canvas of 1859 for the coronation of Czar Alexander II depicts around 200 people, 82 of them have a precise portrait likeness, providing a documented source of iconography of the statesmen of the Russian Empire.

The Imperial family and nobility appreciated Willewalde's amazing ability for accurate depiction, to put on canvas the beauty of the real world, of fabrics and jewelry. In his realist battle scenes, the artist achieved heights the depiction of animals, in particular of horses. He developed his own signature by depicting a favorite type of horse that is always present in his paintings: they were perfectly painted representing an exterior ideal.

=== Exhibitions ===
In 1867, Willewalde displayed his works at the International Exhibition in Paris. In 1873, his works were exhibited in Vienna, followed by Antwerp in 1885, and Berlin in 1886.

== Later life ==
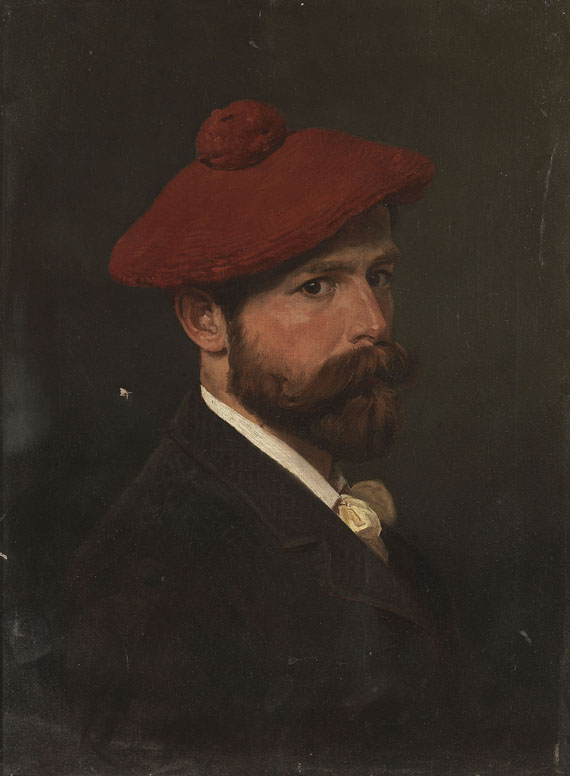
Self-portrait by Alexander Willevalde, Bogdan's son, 1888

The artist spent his final years in Germany. Archival data remain that show the recognition Willewalde received from the Imperial court, and the patronage of the nobility that he enjoyed. Having outlived many of his contemporaries, almost unknown to the new generation, Willewalde died in Dresden on 24 March 1903. His son Alexander, born in 1853, also became a painter.

== Awards and honours ==
Willewalde was made emeritus professor of Military art at the Imperial Academy of Arts in 1888. He received several medals of honour from the Imperial academy, chiefly a major gold medal for his work Battle of Fère-Champenoise (1842).

In 1859, Willewalde was awarded the Order of St Stanislaus, second degree, for the completion of his monumental canvas Triumphant Entry of Their Imperial Majesties into Moscow before their Sacred Coronation 17 August 1859.

In 1894, he was made a fellow of the Academic Council of the Imperial Academy of Arts.

== Gallery ==
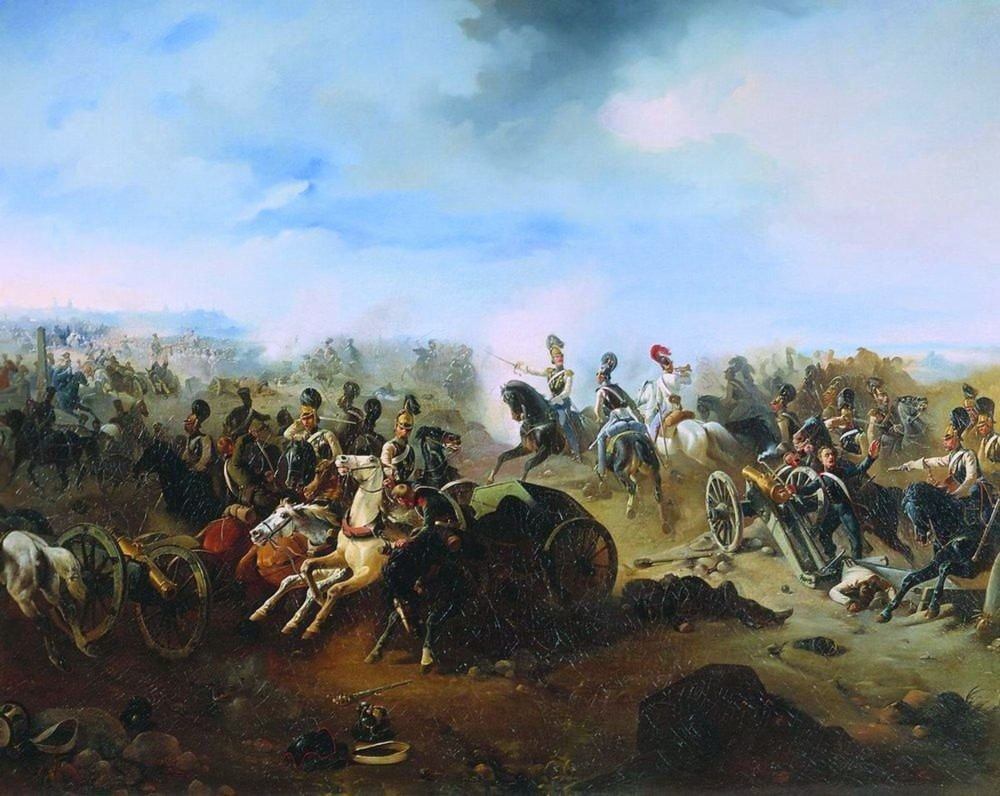
Battle of Grochów, 13 December 1831, (1850s), oil on canvas, Military Historical Museum of Artillery, Engineers and Signal Corps.

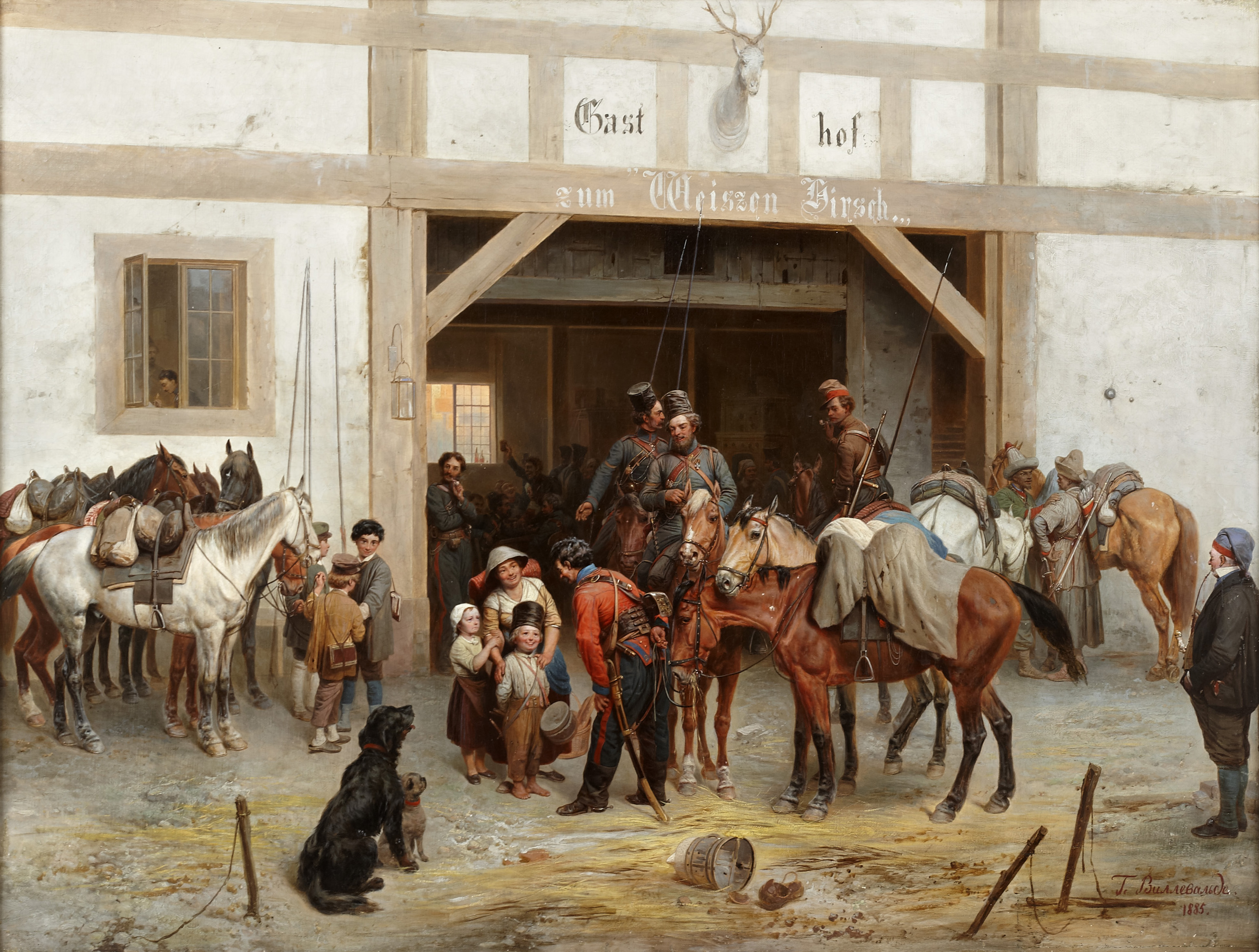
Cossacks in Bautzen, (1885), Yekaterinburg Museum of Fine Arts

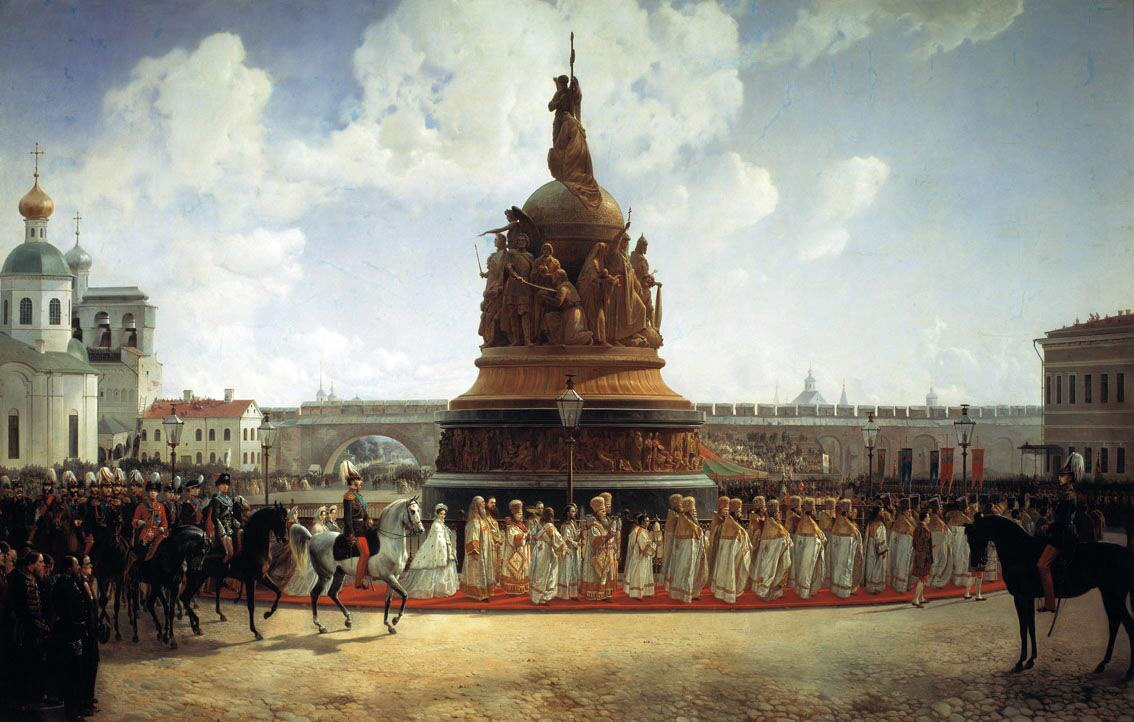
Inauguration of the Millennium of Russia Monument at Novgorod in 1862, (1864), oil on canvas, Novgorod Museum-Reserve.

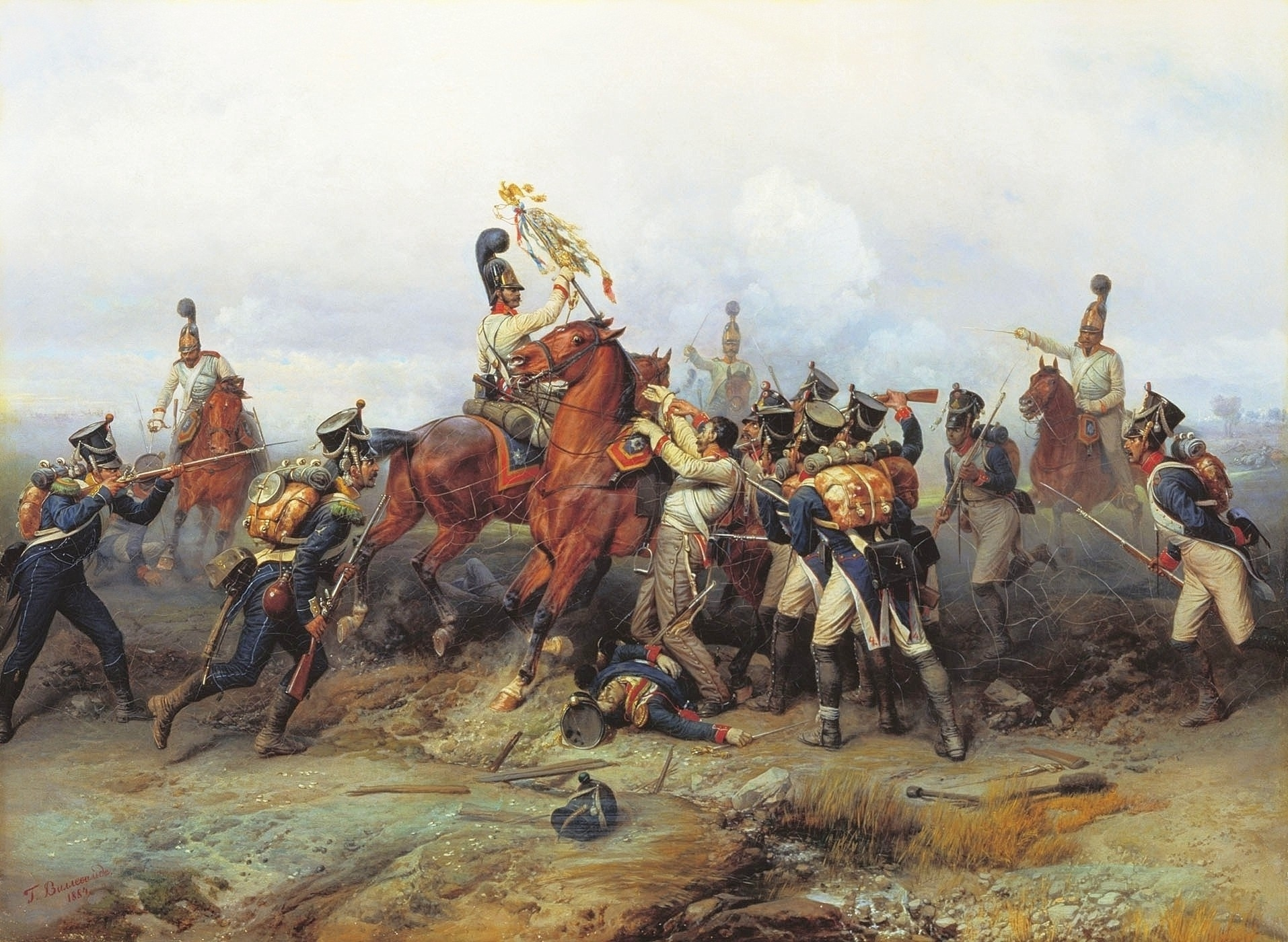
Exploits of the Cavalry Regiment at the Battle of Austerlitz in 1805, (1884), oil on canvas, Military Historical Museum of Artillery, Engineers and Signal Corps

== Sources ==
- Bardovskaya, Larisa V. (2003). "Готфрид Виллевальде: живописец имперского официоза". Nashe Nasledie (in Russian). No. 67–68. Moscow: Nashe Nasledie. pp. 128–135. Archived from the original on October 24, 2012.
