= Swagger (TV series) =

American sports drama television series

- Promotional poster
- Genre: Sports drama
- Created by: Reggie Rock Bythewood
- Starring: O'Shea Jackson Jr.; Isaiah Hill; Shinelle Azoroh; Tessa Ferrer; Quvenzhané Wallis; Caleel Harris; James Bingham; Solomon Irama; Ozie Nzeribe; Jason Rivera; Tristan Wilds
- Country of origin: United States
- Original language: English
- No. of seasons: 2
- No. of episodes: 18

Production
- Executive producers: Reggie Rock Bythewood; Kevin Durant; Brian Grazer; Rich Kleiman; Samantha Corbin-Miller
- Running time: 45–62 minutes
- Production companies: Undisputed Cinema; Thirty Five Ventures; Imagine Television; CBS Studios

Original release
- Network: Apple TV+
- Release: October 29, 2021 – August 11, 2023

Swagger is an American sports drama television series created by Reggie Rock Bythewood. Loosely inspired by the experiences of NBA player Kevin Durant, the series premiered on October 29, 2021 on Apple TV+. In June 2022, the series was renewed for a second season. In November 2023, the series was canceled after two seasons. Swagger has garnered critical acclaim from critics for its writing, acting (primarily Jackson's and Hill's), production values and social commentary.

== Premise ==
Swagger explores the world of youth basketball, and the players, their families and coaches who walk the fine line between dreams and ambition, and opportunism and corruption.

== Cast ==
=== Main ===
- O'Shea Jackson Jr. as Ike “Icon” Edwards
- Isaiah Hill as Jace Carson
- Shinelle Azoroh as Jenna Carson
- Tessa Ferrer as Meg Bailey
- Quvenzhané Wallis as Crystal Jarrett
- Caleel Harris as Musa Rahim
- James Bingham as Drew Murphy
- Solomon Irama as Phil Marksby
- Ozie Nzeribe as Royale Hughes
- Jason Rivera-Torres as Nick Mendez
- Tristan Wilds as Alonzo Powers
- Christina Jackson as Tonya Edwards (recurring season 1, main season 2), Ike's wife.
- Sean Baker as Naim Rahim (recurring season 1, main season 2), Swagger's deputy coach and Musa's father.
- Orlando Jones as Emory Price (season 2)
- Shannon Brown as CJ Ryder (season 2), Cedar Cove basketball player

=== Recurring ===
- Marc Blucas as Coach Bobby, a rival team coach.
- Jordan Rice as Jackie Carson, Jenna's daughter and Jace's older sister.
- Al Mitchell as Coach Warrick, Crystal's basketball coach who abuses his players.
- Javen Lewis as Vince Charles, a Swagger player.
- Tracey Bonner as Angie Jarrett, Crystal's mother.
- Monique Grant as Kiesha Marksby, Phil's mother.
- Marti O. Pruitt as Jeremiah Jarrett, Crystal's father.
- Miles Mussenden as Brett Hughes, Royale's father and a financial backer of Swagger.
- Misha Gonz-Cirkl as Teresa Mendez, Nick's mother
- Avery Serell Wills Jr. as Ricky, a Swagger player.
- Nadej K. Bailey as Tamika, Musa's love interest
- Kurt Lamarr as Coach Charlie Edwards, Ike's father
- Arischa Conner as Apocalypse Anne
- Katie Killacky as Eva Murphy, Drew's mother
- Brian K. Landis as Warren Murphy, Drew's father
- Caroline Elizabeth Gregory as Amber Gibbons (season 2), Jace's high school girlfriend
- RJ Thomas as Johnny Fitzpatrick (season 2), Cedar Cove basketball player
- Wayne Hughes as Seymour Greyson (season 2)
- Christopher B. Duncan as Camden Ryder Sr. (season 2), CJ's father
- Vinessa Shaw as Diane (season 2), Chairwoman of the Cedar Cove Prep School Board
- Arlise Rae Minter as Kathryn Edwards (season 2), Ike's daughter
- Catherine Owens as Rae
- Kaci Barker as Drea

=== Guest ===
- Jetta Strayhorn as Michelle, Crystal's basketball teammate abused by Coach Warrick (season one)
- Andrew C. Williams as Kai
- Robert Crayton as Barber Marvin
- Marki Henderson as Waves
- Jared Wofford as Harold Phillips
- Gwen L. Johnson as Cynthia
- Tedd Taskey as Mike Reese (season 2)
- John Carlos as himself

== Episodes ==
Season	Episodes	Originally released	
Season	Episodes	First released	Last released
1	10	October 29, 2021	December 17, 2021
2	8	June 23, 2023	August 11, 2023

=== Season 1 (2021) ===
No. overall	No. in season	Title	Directed by	Written by	Original release date
1	1	"NBA"	Reggie Rock Bythewood	Reggie Rock Bythewood	October 29, 2021
2	2	"Haterade"	Alex Hall	Samantha Corbin-Miller	October 29, 2021
3	3	"Mano a Mano"	Alex Hall	Eric Simonson & Héctor Oliveras García	October 29, 2021
4	4	"We Good?"	Rachel Leiterman	Norman Vance, Jr.	November 5, 2021
5	5	"24 Hour Person"	Rachel Leiterman	Katrina O'Gilvie & Steve DiUbaldo	November 12, 2021
6	6	"All on the Line"	Nijla Mu'min	Teleplay by : Nijla Mu'min; Story by : Nijla Mu'min & Danielle Iman	November 19, 2021
7	7	"#RADICALS"	Reggie Rock Bythewood	Reggie Rock Bythewood & George Dohrmann	November 25, 2021
8	8	"Still I Rise"	Janice Cooke	Teleplay by : Samantha Corbin-Miller & George Dohrmann & Steve DiUbaldo; Story by : Samantha Corbin-Miller	December 3, 2021
9	9	"Follow-Through"	Janice Cooke	Teleplay by : Eric Simonson & Danielle Iman & Nijla Mu'min; Story by : Eric Simonson & Danielle Iman	December 10, 2021
10	10	"Florida"	Alex Hall	Teleplay by : Reggie Rock Bythewood and Norman Vance & Katrina O'Gilvie; Story by : Reggie Rock Bythewood & Hector Oliveras Garcia	December 17, 2021

=== Season 2 (2023) ===
No. overall	No. in season	Title	Directed by	Written by	Original release date
11	1	"The World Ain't Ready"	Reggie Rock Bythewood	Reggie Rock Bythewood	June 23, 2023
12	2	"18"	Matthew A. Cherry	Steve DiUbaldo	June 30, 2023
13	3	"RISE + FALL"	Matthew A. Cherry	Teleplay by : Joy Kecken; Story by : Joy Kecken & Autumn Joy Jimerson	July 7, 2023
14	4	"Through the Fire"	Reggie Rock Bythewood	J. M. Holmes & George Dohrmann	July 14, 2023
15	5	"Are We Free?"	Reggie Rock Bythewood	Reggie Rock Bythewood & Racquel Baker	July 21, 2023
16	6	"Jace + Crystal"	Nijla Mu'min	Steve DiUbaldo & Autumn Joy Jimerson	July 28, 2023
17	7	"Homecoming"	Katina Medina Mora	J. M. Holmes & Rebecca Murga	August 4, 2023
18	8	"Journey and Destination"	Katina Medina Mora	George Dohrmann & Racquel Baker	August 11, 2023

== Production ==
=== Development ===
Apple began developing the project in February 2018, and it was ordered in December 2018 as a sports drama television series titled Swagger from Kevin Durant and Reggie Rock Bythewood. Bythewood will be the showrunner, writer, director, and executive producer with Durant, Brian Grazer, Francie Calfo, Rich Kleiman, and Samantha Corbin Miller executive producing. On June 15, 2022, Apple renewed the series for a second season. On November 30, 2023, Apple announced that the series was canceled after two seasons.

=== Casting ===
In October 2019, Deadline Hollywood reported that Winston Duke was cast as the lead, but in February 2020, Duke suffered an injury on set and was replaced with O’Shea Jackson Jr. On July 9, 2020, Quvenzhané Wallis joined the series in the role of Crystal, and on January 15, 2021, Isaiah Hill, Shinelle Azoroh, Tristan Mack Wilds, Caleel Harris, Tessa Ferrer, Jason Rivera, Solomon Irama, Ozie Nzeribe, and James Bingham were all revealed to have been cast. On August 11, 2022, Orlando Jones and Shannon Brown joined the cast as series regulars, while Christina Jackson and Sean Baker were promoted to series regulars for the second season.

=== Filming ===
Alongside the casting of Winston Duke, Deadline Hollywood reported that filming would occur in October 2019. After Duke’s injury in February 2020, filming was delayed due to recasting, and was then delayed even further due to the COVID-19 pandemic. By December 2020, filming restarted in Richmond, Virginia, with filming also taking place in Hopewell, Virginia in March 2021. In April 2021, filming wrapped for the series.
