= Monkey's Magic Merry Go Round =

2024 horror film

- Directed by: Aidan Leary
- Written by: Aidan Leary; C.R. Thompson
- Starring: Michael Gilio
- Production companies: Terror Town; Great Escape; Yale Productions
- Distributed by: Cineverse
- Release dates: November 15, 2024 (Leeds International Film Festival); May 19, 2026 (United States)
- Country: United States
- Language: English

Monkey's Magic Merry Go Round is a 2024 American psychological horror film directed by Aidan Leary, in his feature directorial debut, from a screenplay he co-wrote with C.R. Thompson. The film stars Michael Gilio, and was produced under Joe Swanberg's "Terror Town" genre slate through Yale Productions, and distributed by Cineverse.

== Plot ==
James "Jimbo" Jensen hosts a small, low-budget children's show called Monkey's Magic Merry Go Round. He performs alongside puppet characters known as the Playground Pals. His closest partner is Monkey, a primate-themed mascot who always tries to keep James happy and stop him from feeling "blue".

== Cast ==
- Michael Gilio as James Jensen
- Frank Cesario as Monkey
- Jackie Smook as Fausty Fox
- Liv Mershon as the Post Lady

== Release ==
Monkey's Magic Merry Go Round had its world premiere at the Leeds International Film Festival in the United Kingdom, before being shopped to international buyers at the American Film Market. It was later released for streaming on Screambox, Cineverse's horror-focused platform, on May 19, 2026, alongside a digital rental/purchase release on platforms including Amazon Prime Video.

== Reception ==
CineMagazine rated the film 2.5 stars. Eli Robinson said the film "may stumble in its pacing: by telegraphing the overall route of its narrative ahead of time, these very imperfections contribute to its enigmatic charm." Evan Attivo of Night Frights Film Festival said, "delivers a special horror experience on Screambox for the inner child inside all of us, calling to mind our own memories of what it was like getting up early in the morning to watch our favorite television shows, while showing that traditional genre tropes can feel like something we have never seen before when we are exposed to new and unusual ways of storytelling in the horror genre."
