= One Spoon of Chocolate =

2025 American film by RZA

- Theatrical release poster
- Directed by: The RZA
- Written by: The RZA
- Produced by: Robert Diggs; Paul E. Hall
- Starring: Shameik Moore; Paris Jackson; RJ Cyler; Harry Goodwins; Johnell Young; Michael Harney; Rockmond Dunbar; E'myri Crutchfield; Blair Underwood; Jason Isbell; Isaiah Hill; James Lee Thomas
- Cinematography: Brandon Cox
- Edited by: Joe D'Augustine
- Music by: Tyler Bates; The RZA
- Production companies: RZA Productions; Xen Diagram Media
- Distributed by: 36 Cinema Distribution; Variance Films
- Release dates: June 8, 2025 (Tribeca Festival); May 1, 2026 (United States)
- Running time: 112 minutes
- Country: United States
- Language: English
- Box office: $743,092

One Spoon of Chocolate is a 2025 American action thriller drama film written, produced and directed by RZA. (Note: RZA is credited for his work as writer, director, and composer as the RZA, and under his birth name Robert Diggs as a producer) It stars Shameik Moore, Paris Jackson, RJ Cyler, Harry Goodwins, Johnell Young, Michael Harney, Rockmond Dunbar, E'myri Crutchfield, Blair Underwood, Jason Isbell, Isaiah Hill (in his feature film debut), James Lee Thomas, and Jason Vendryes.

The film premiered at the 2025 Tribeca Festival on June 8, 2025 and was released in the United States on May 1, 2026.

== Plot ==
Randy "Unique" Joneson is a veteran who is seeking a quiet life in his hometown of Karenville, Ohio after being released from prison in New York. He moves in with his cousin, Ramsee, to claim his half of the family home. However, Karenville is a sundown town that is controlled by a corrupt and racist Sheriff McLeoud. McLeoud is operating an organ harvesting scheme targeting black men. Sheriff McLeoud's son, Jimmy, leads a gang who roam the streets at night with baseball bats, hunting lone black men. The scheme comes to light with the disappearance of Unique's other cousin, Lonnie, a local star athlete, whose organs are harvested by the town doctor.

Trying to protect his family, Unique attempts to maintain a low profile. He starts to form a relationship with Darla, a friend of Ramsee's girlfriend. Darla encourages Unique to live a peaceful life. However, Unique's situation changes when the gang targets and abducts Ramsee. Due to the Sheriff's involvement, Unique does not report the crime.

Back in New York, Unique's parole officer, Officer Beem, becomes concerned after Sheriff McLeoud's reports that Unique has not checked in. During the conversation, Beem overhears communication from the Sheriff that reveals the organ harvesting scheme. Fearing for Unique, Beem travels to Ohio.

Utilizing his military training, Unique begins to fight back against the gang. Unique infiltrates Jimmy's clubhouse and kills each member of the gang until only Jimmy remains. During the confrontation, the Sheriff's office, Officer Beem, and other townspeople gather outside, along with a news reporter. Unique tricks Jimmy into confessing to the murders, supremacist ideology, and organ theft scheme over an intercom broadcasting to everyone outside before he executes Jimmy, ending McLeoud's lineage.

== Cast ==
- Shameik Moore as Randy "Unique" Joneson
- RJ Cyler as Ramsee Joneson
- Harry Goodwins as Jimmy McLeoud
- Paris Jackson as Darla
- Blair Underwood as Ronald Beem
- Johnell Young as Dap
- Michael Harney as Sheriff McLeoud
- Rockmond Dunbar as Mr. Lindsey
- E'myri Crutchfield as Aretha
- James Lee Thomas as Jesse McLeoud
- Michael Bekemeier as Paulie
- Brandon Bonilla as Mickey
- Jason Vendryes as Deputy Susky
- Jason Isbell as Business Man
- Isaiah Hill as Lonnie Joneson

== Production ==
In October 2012, in an interview with The New York Times, RZA revealed that he was working on his next feature film, titled One Spoon of Chocolate, which was described as a period piece set between the 1960s and 1970s.

In late April 2024, Shameik Moore, Paris Jackson, RJ Cyler, Harry Goodwins, Johnell Young, Michael Harney, Rockmond Dunbar, E'myri Crutchfield, and Blair Underwood joined the cast of the film. In May, Jason Isbell, Isaiah Hill, and James Lee Thomas joined the cast in an undisclosed role.

=== Filming ===
Principal photography began in April 2024, in Atlanta, and wrapped in July.

== Release ==
One Spoon of Chocolate premiered at the Tribeca Festival on June 8, 2025. In March 2026, it was announced that RZA had launched a distribution label named 36 Cinema Distribution, with One Spoon of Chocolate being its maiden release in association with Variance Films; Quentin Tarantino also boarded the film as a presenter. The film was theatrically released in the United States on May 1, 2026, with select engagements presented on 35mm.

== Reception ==
On the review aggregator website Rotten Tomatoes, 42% of 31 critics' reviews are positive, with an average rating of 5.1/10. Metacritic, which uses a weighted average, assigned the film a score of 38 out of 100, based on 5 critics, indicating "generally unfavorable" reviews.
