= Grey's Anatomy season 10 =

Grey's Anatomy
- Season 10
- DVD cover art for the tenth season of Grey's Anatomy
- Showrunners: Tony Phelan; Shonda Rhimes; Joan Rater
- Starring: Ellen Pompeo; Sandra Oh; Justin Chambers; Chandra Wilson; James Pickens Jr.; Sara Ramirez; Kevin McKidd; Jessica Capshaw; Sarah Drew; Jesse Williams; Camilla Luddington; Gaius Charles; Jerrika Hinton; Tessa Ferrer; Patrick Dempsey
- No. of episodes: 24

Release
- Original network: ABC
- Original release: September 26, 2013 – May 15, 2014

Season chronology
- ← Previous; Season 9 Next → Season 11

The tenth season of the American television medical drama Grey's Anatomy premiered on September 26, 2013, with a two-hour special episode in the United States on the American Broadcasting Company (ABC), and it concluded with a Farewell to Cristina finale episode "Fear (Of the Unknown)" on May 15, 2014. The season was produced by ABC Studios, in association with Shondaland Production Company and The Mark Gordon Company; the showrunners being Tony Phelan and Joan Rater. The season was officially released on DVD as a 6-disc box-set under the title of Grey's Anatomy: The Complete Tenth Season – Live for the Moments on September 2, 2014, by Buena Vista Home Entertainment.

The season mainly focuses on the relationship between the show's protagonist Meredith Grey (Ellen Pompeo) and "her person" Cristina Yang (Sandra Oh) as both follow different paths relating their careers straining their relationship. Derek Shepherd (Patrick Dempsey) and Callie Torres (Sara Ramirez), having separated from her wife Arizona Robbins (Jessica Capshaw), teamed up with the White House to work on a brain mapping project. Miranda Bailey (Chandra Wilson) was on a project mapping out the human genome. Yang and Owen Hunt (Kevin McKidd) gradually take their relationship from complicated and painful to a place of real friendship. April Kepner (Sarah Drew) and Jackson Avery (Jesse Williams) elope during Kepner and paramedic Matthew Taylor's (Justin Bruening) wedding. Yang takes off to Switzerland for a job offer to take over Preston Burke's (Isaiah Washington) hospital because he wants to step down and move his family. She bids her farewell to her colleagues of the last 8 years, including Hunt and dances it out with Meredith one last time to an old favorite song. Caterina Scorsone begins portraying the role of Dr. Amelia Shepherd in a recurring capacity, as Amelia visits Meredith and her brother at their home and helps take care of their children. She is upgraded to a series regular in season 11 following her decision to move to Seattle full-time.

The season garnered 12.12 million viewers average viewers and was ranked #15 overall in total viewers which is 11 spots higher than the previous season. In the 18-49 key demographic, it ranked #5 and for the 2013–2014 primetime TV schedule, Grey's was the #1 drama in the 18-49 key demographic. James Pickens, Jr. and Chandra Wilson were nominated for Outstanding Actor and Outstanding Actress, respectively, at the 45th NAACP Image Awards. The show also garnered 5 nominations at the 40th People's Choice Awards. It was announced on May 8, 2014, by ABC that Grey's Anatomy would return in the fall of 2014 for an eleventh season.

The website Screen Rant ranked the season #8 on their 2023 ranking of the 19 Grey's Anatomy seasons.

== Episodes ==
The number in the "No. overall" column refers to the episode's number within the overall series, whereas the number in the "No. in season" column refers to the episode's number within this particular season. "U.S. viewers in millions" refers to the number of Americans in millions who watched the episodes live. Each episode of this season is named after a song.

No. overall	No. in season	Title	Directed by	Written by	Original release date	Prod. code	U.S. viewers (millions)
197	1	"Seal Our Fate"	Rob Corn	Joan Rater	September 26, 2013	1001	9.27
Following the storm, the doctors of Grey Sloan Memorial attempt to care for victims, but soon find the ER overrun. Richard remains unconscious in the basement after receiving a severe electric shock and Bailey sends Shane to find him. Shane, however, passes the task over to Heather in an attempt to steal her surgery with Derek. Heather spots Richard on the basement floor, but she is also electrocuted when she hastily rushes to help him. The pair are later discovered and Derek and Shane begin trying to save Heather, while Cristina and Bailey attempt to revive Richard. Meredith remains sidelined after giving birth to her son. Arizona desperately attempts to regain her relationship with Callie after choosing to cheat on her, but Callie is uninterested. Cristina and Bailey clash about Richard's treatment and take the dispute to Chief Hunt who discovers that Richard has made Meredith responsible for his medical decisions.
198	2	"I Want You with Me"	Chandra Wilson	Debora Cahn	September 26, 2013	1002	9.27
Derek fails in his attempts to save Heather, leaving Shane feeling responsible for his colleague's death. The interns are tasked with comforting Heather's mother when she arrives, but realize that they had been bad friends to her, and resolve to look out for each other more. Bailey and Cristina clash over how to proceed with Richard's condition, with Bailey wanting to perform risky surgery. Meredith ultimately accepts responsibility for Richard's care and allows Bailey to follow her instincts, saving Richard's life. Jackson rejects April following her declaration of love and she decides to go ahead with her engagement to Matthew. Owen and Cristina struggle to stay apart following their split and end up in bed twice in the name of giving each other a better last memory. Arizona tracks Callie down to Meredith's house but Callie does not want her back and informs Arizona that they will now take turns caring for Sofia. Arizona later returns, desperate to see Sofia and while Callie initially refuses, Cristina urges her to not bring Sofia into the fight, resulting in Arizona being granted five minutes with her daughter. Arizona returns home and discovers that Callie has moved out and taken Sofia with her.
199	3	"Everybody's Crying Mercy"	Tony Phelan	Tia Napolitano	October 3, 2013	1003	9.60
The storm has passed, but the damage still remains. Callie and Arizona agreed to attend marriage counseling, but Callie, who is still deeply hurt by Arizona's betrayal, decides Arizona should go by herself. Derek and Meredith are on leave to take care of their new baby and they are having quite a time adjusting to their new life. The group of interns is beginning to study for their residency exams, and April anxiously waits to hear about the results of her board exams, which she finally passes. Cristina encourages Alex to have sex with Jo, and in her own failing relationship, she tells Owen that it's time to start seeing other people. Owen and Avery butt heads over hospital finance issues: Owen wants money to fix the hospital and Avery wants money for surgeries. Webber needs a feeding tube to survive, but Bailey has an alternative, less effective, plan that will save Webber’s dignity but not his life. Webber tells Meredith that he picked the wrong person to be in charge of his health decisions.
200	4	"Puttin' On the Ritz"	Rob Corn	Austin Guzman	October 10, 2013	1004	8.79
To raise money to repair the damage done to Grey Sloan Memorial Hospital, the doctors are dressed to the nines and throwing a fundraiser gala. All is going well at the gala, until an entertainer falls on top of the gala organizer, resulting in serious injuries. Meanwhile, April and Arizona stay in the supply closet trading relationship stories and drinking champagne. Alex leaves Jo at the gala, after seeing a junkie—whom he thinks is his dad—ushered into the ER. He decides to do a paternity test to find out, and in the middle of his telling Jo that he doesn't want to know if the junkie is his dad or not, Jo blurts it out that he is. Cristina and Owen’s breakup becomes more real after a doctor from Seattle Presbyterian starts flirting with Owen at the gala. Bailey is stuck between a rock and a hard place, rather, two difficult patients: one who has cancer that can’t be treated, and Dr. Webber who has multiple options of treatment but doesn’t want to pursue any of them. Meredith and Derek, who have been on leave from the hospital, return and rediscover their love for surgeries.
201	5	"I Bet It Stung"	Mark Jackson	Jeannine Renshaw	October 17, 2013	1005	8.78
Alex's dad is still at Grey Sloan Memorial Hospital, and Jo is doing everything she can to mend the relationship between Alex and his dad. Meredith teams up with Cristina to do groundbreaking surgery—a heart/liver transplant, but due to unfortunate circumstances (having to breast pump and console Zola after she gets hurt), Meredith is unprepared, unfocused, and late to her surgery. Cristina confronts Meredith and says that they're in different places and they want different things, and that's okay, but she's not willing to let up like Meredith. In turn, Meredith gets upset with Derek for making her miss her surgery because he didn't answer his phone. Webber, with the help and urging from Catherine Avery, returns to his old self—a take-charge kind of guy, ordering the residents around. Callie has a revelation with her patient’s "donor sister" that "you can say 'no'," so Callie kicks Arizona out of her apartment and celebrates by dancing in her underwear.
202	6	"Map of You"	David Greenspan	William Harper	October 24, 2013	1006	8.73
It's time for Meredith to decide what her topic of research will be, and after much debate, she decides that she's going to continue her mother’s research by taking it in a new direction. Derek and Callie have teamed up to work on a brain mapping project, but Callie feels like she should be working with regenerative cartilage. Webber uses his condition to teach Jo, the now second year resident, how to be a better doctor. Because he has taken a professional liking to Cristina, and she to him as well, Shane reveals to Derek that he no longer has any interest in working with him on his brain mapping project. Cristina takes an interest in Meredith's research, but Meredith, who is still hurt by what Cristina said to her, doesn't take it kindly. Alex takes a step to get closer to his dad, and while they're jamming on their guitars, Alex’s dad tells him that he has family in Florida. Leah reveals to her residents that she had a fling with Arizona, and Arizona succumbs to loneliness and texts Leah.
203	7	"Thriller"	Cherie Nowlan	Gabriel Llanas	October 31, 2013	1007	8.94
A delusional, psychotic drug addict, who has a condition where his heart is on the opposite side of his chest, makes his way into the ER after he was shot multiple times because he was eating the face of another patient. A ghost-like patient of Dr. Brooks finds herself in need of help, but she demands that she'll only see Dr. Brooks until Shane tells her Brooks is dead. Cristina and Owen team up to do surgery on the zombie-like drug addict, and they find out that they actually can work together. Alex and Jo are on another Peds case and save a little girl from being literally "scared to death." Webber kicks Bailey off his case, and he reappoints Meredith telling her he wants her to help him teach the 2nd year residents. Ben returns to surprise Bailey and Tuck for Halloween, and springs it on Bailey that he has dropped out of his residency to spend more time with her.
204	8	"Two Against One"	Kevin McKidd	Meg Marinis	November 7, 2013	1008	8.68
Meredith reaches the next milestone in her research when a 3D printer arrives at Grey Sloan Memorial Hospital. Derek, who is itching to get back in the OR, notices a man at Meredith’s presentation who has an eye twitch. Derek and Jackson come together to work on this man, and while doing so, Derek tells Jackson that the time has come for Jackson to let the 2nd year residents practice on their own. Bailey is losing her mind about a "smell" in Tuck’s bedroom, as well as a nonexistent hole in her patient’s body. Callie conducts an interview with Owen’s new girlfriend, Emma, but while talking to Arizona, Emma realizes that she could never work at Grey Sloan Memorial Hospital because if something were to happen to her and Owen, everyone would side with Owen. Webber tells April that he finally found himself again when he started CPR on his neighbor who had fallen, which then leads April to tell her fiancée, Matthew, that they need to wait to have sex until they get married. Cristina betrays Meredith by going behind her back with Ross and destroying her 3D-printed liver in order to print a conduit for Cristina and Ross’ patient.
205	9	"Sorry Seems to Be the Hardest Word"	Jeannot Szwarc	Stacy McKee	November 14, 2013	1009	8.56
Callie is facing a malpractice lawsuit filed by an Olympic athlete that was referred by Cristina. During the athlete’s hip surgery, his oxygen level dropped and his heart started beating really fast causing the team of doctors to close up without removing the last sponge. Callie's father returns to show his daughter support, and learns that Callie and Arizona are no longer together. Through flashbacks, it is revealed that Callie and Arizona had chosen a sperm donor to inseminate Arizona; they wanted a second child. However, during one of the pregnancy check-ups, their doctor couldn't find the heart beat because she had miscarried. Through the trial process, Cristina tells the jury that she had insisted working on the athlete's heart before his legs (which had been affected by a post-op infection); Callie did not agree to this sequencing, and that is why they went ahead with a second surgery on his legs. Callie’s father, in effort of saving his daughter's marriage, reveals that he once cheated on her mother and had her mother not given him a second chance, he wouldn't have Callie. This persuades Callie to go to Arizona and ask her to move back.
206	10	"Somebody That I Used to Know"	Debbie Allen	Debora Cahn	November 21, 2013	1010	8.61
Ben confides in Shepherd about Bailey’s recently odd behavior, which he thinks is OCD. This raises concern and results in Shepherd and Owen doubting Bailey’s mental and physical competencies. Now that Arizona has moved back in with Callie, she tells Callie that she was involved with someone. It is later revealed during surgery that the "someone" was Leah. Awkward tension grows between April and Jackson when she tells him he's not getting an invitation to her wedding because Matthew feels weird inviting him, plus she thought he would be Stephanie’s "plus one." While Meredith is busy working with Richard to get him out of the hospital, she is also planning a Thanksgiving dinner at her house and Emma’s cooking the dinner. Webber, who is eager to leave and despite Jo’s warnings, pushes himself too hard on the treadmill and falls down resulting in broken ribs. Because he's going to be stuck in the hospital a little while longer with the residents, the residents plan a KFC Thanksgiving dinner. Cristina and Shane need to use the 3D printer again since their first conduit got contaminated, but Meredith says they can't because she absolutely needs it for her research.
207	11	"Man on the Moon"	Bobby Roth	Elizabeth J. B. Klaviter	December 5, 2013	1011	7.02
Bailey is working with a psychiatrist to learn how to manage her OCD, but it's only with Webber’s help that she finally accepts that she has a disease and needs to take her medicine. April's sisters fly into Seattle to throw her a bridal shower at Grey Sloan Memorial Hospital, but things don't go as planned. She dethrones them from bridesmaid status and announces that Arizona, Cristina, and Meredith are now her people and new bridesmaids. Stephanie and Meredith insert their first conduit into a sheep, but it fails to work and the sheep dies; however, Cristina and Ross put their first conduit into their patient and it surprisingly works. In discussing their conduits, what starts out as a civil conversation turns into a heated argument when Meredith asks Cristina what's wrong with Ross as he is now aggressive and mean. Jimmy, Karev's father, finally tells Karev that he knew who he was ever since he got mad at him at the bar and has been trying to get clean ever since.
208	12	"Get Up, Stand Up"	Tony Phelan	William Harper	December 12, 2013	1012	8.36
As April and Matthew’s wedding day draws near, the doctors at Grey Sloan Memorial Hospital prepare for the big day while dealing with their own issues. Derek is working with a federal initiative that wants to use his name to support their work, but he refuses their offer because he is supposed to be cutting back so that Meredith can take more time for her research. Alex starts to get along with his dad, but it comes to a halting stop when his dad starts talking poorly of his mother. Meredith and Cristina argue while getting fitted for their bridesmaid dresses, but when they show up to April's wedding, they start to mend their differences by accepting that they are in different places. Bailey tells Ben that it's essentially his fault for her OCD troubles because her symptoms only worsened when he quit surgery. Jimmy requires emergency heart surgery, and Shane rushes him into the OR; however, Webber has to take over when Shane begins to relive Brooks' death. During April and Matthew's wedding, Derek gets a call from the President of the United States, and Jackson stands up and confesses his love for April.
209	13	"Take It Back"	Rob Corn	Austin Guzman	February 27, 2014	1013	9.42
After a short prologue in which April and Jackson drive off together - April still hesitant over her actions - and Arizona tries to end her marriage with Callie, the episode skips to "three weeks later". Meredith is upset with Derek for agreeing to the President's offer, which means going back on his promise to her to take a back seat to her research. Callie and Arizona buy a new house that’ll be theirs together, with Arizona wanting to give their relationship one last new start. Chief Hunt begins to ride Ross aggressively in the ER, not just after the botched surgery with Jimmy but (according to an accusative Webber) because he has learned that Ross had been sleeping with Cristina. Alex's emotional plea to Jo turns out to, in his mind, have been a marriage proposal; Jo turns him down, claiming they're not ready, but continues to stand by him when Jimmy passes away. Bailey and Ben start talking and working through his arrival. She tells him that she's worried that he'll be at home waiting on her just like Tucker used to do, and he resumes his internship... at Grey Sloan. Stephanie is having a hard time accepting that Jackson broke up with her for April and, with Leah's encouragement, someone anonymously files an HR complaint on behalf of the interns concerning sexual harassment from their attendings. In response, the HR department implements a strict non-fraternization policy on the spot... which could prove problematic for April and Jackson, who are revealed to have eloped three weeks ago.
210	14	"You've Got to Hide Your Love Away"	Ron Underwood	Tia Napolitano	March 6, 2014	1014	8.21
With the new non-fraternizing policy in place at Grey Sloan Memorial Hospital, the doctors have to face a new way of life. Alex, Jo, Jackson, and April are all trying to hide the fact that they are together; however, Jackson and April reveal in a meeting, which was called to discuss Alex and Jo’s relationship, that they are actually married. Owen and Emma go from discussing children and living together to calling it off after Owen sleeps with Cristina once more. Derek’s interview with the President of the United States was cancelled much to his dismay; however, he later gets a call saying that they want him to run the advisory board for the whole project.
211	15	"Throwing It All Away"	Chris Hayden	William Harper	March 13, 2014	1015	7.36
Alex has been suspended from surgery for three days as a consequence for his actions during the meeting called to discuss his relationship with Jo. Stephanie accidentally knocks over Arizona and Jackson with gurneys, and while filing an accident report, she lets Jackson know that there's no need for him to apologize to her because she's over him. Derek has to tell Callie that they can't continue with their research because of the guidelines in his contract with his colleagues at the White House. As if that's not enough, Callie learns the HR complaint was filed by Leah against her, as Leah felt that she was cheated out of a learning opportunity and needed to stand up for herself and others. This is the final straw for Callie who has another "this-isn’t-working" talk with Arizona.
212	16	"We Gotta Get Out of This Place"	Susan Vaill	Jeannine Renshaw	March 20, 2014	1016	8.09
While some doctors at Grey Sloan Memorial Hospital are celebrating Dr. Webber's birthday with an awesome surgery, others aren't so happy. Bailey, Leah, Meredith, and Richard all pitch in on a case that is very rare: a patient absorbed his twin while still in the womb. Cristina, while working on her heart trial with Ross, is working endlessly to set Owen up with women; she even created him an online dating profile. Callie and Derek butt heads and enter a short-term legal battle concerning their sensors and their research. Ultimately, Callie convinces Derek that he needs to tell the White House that either the policy of sole ownership of the sensors goes or he goes. The White House concedes. Jackson's mother, Catherine, comes back to town to correct the mistake that she feels was made by April and Jackson. Jackson, always feeling bound by his overbearing mother, fights against her accusations against April. This leads April and Jackson to the revelation that they need to work some things out, especially the topic of how they will raise their kids.
213	17	"Do You Know?"	Chandra Wilson	Stacy McKee	March 27, 2014	1017	8.42
Cristina comes to experience two very different universes—on a quest to answer the question, "Do you know who you are?"—after she does very difficult heart repair work on her patient who is on a ventilator and paralyzed from the neck down. In the first universe, the patient decides that he wants to be taken off the ventilator which sends Cristina into Owen’s arms when she realizes that they are throwing away their love for each other. Time is quickly passing as the two get married, move in together, get a dog, have a baby, await the birth of their second child, and see Ross win the Harper Avery Award for Cristina's trial that she quit on to take care of her family. The second universe begins when Cristina comes back to reality and her patient says he doesn't want to be taken off the ventilator. This once again sends Cristina into Owen's arms, but this time, she's happy. However, the stipulation that they will never have kids still remains, which Owen initially accepts. They continue to have their on-again, off-again relationship which drives Owen to drinking more than he should, putting himself and his patients in grave danger. Cristina tells him it's over for good, and she goes on to win the Harper Avery Award for four straight years. Once again, Cristina comes back to reality. This time, her patient decides to be taken off the ventilator; however, she's able to save Jackson from injuring his hand, and her hesitancy to approach Owen allows Meredith to approach her about a patient, which allows Owen to get on the elevator before she can greet him. Absent: Tessa Ferrer as Leah Murphy due to cut scenes.
214	18	"You Be Illin'"	Nicole Rubio	Zoanne Clack	April 3, 2014	1018	8.28
A virus breaks out at Grey Sloan Memorial Hospital. Because of the close encounters of doctors and patients, the virus spreads like wild fire. It first knocks out Jackson, then Leah, and finally Derek. It's an inopportune time for Derek to get sick because it's the day of his presentation on brain mapping; to fill in for him, Meredith steps up and delivers her own twist on his speech. Callie teaches Jo about the joys of ortho and how it presents the opportunity to take out all frustration on the patient while helping them, plus it pays. Cristina and Owen team up to work on a pair of sisters who have cardiomyopathy caused by an unknown source, and even though they caught the issue in time, the sisters' brother starts showing similar symptoms. Because Cristina is busy on this case, Shane has to step up and take care of the babies in Cristina's trial, a.k.a. her "baby." Alex receives an offer from a doctor who runs his own private practice. Alex seriously considers and starts to discuss it with Jo. April and Bailey operate on a child who is very susceptible to infection due to his condition that is no longer treatable with the enzyme treatments he was previously receiving.
215	19	"I'm Winning"	Kevin McKidd	Joan Rater	April 10, 2014	1019	8.18
It's that time of year when the nominees for the annual Harper Avery Award are announced, and Grey Sloan Memorial Hospital's own Dr. Cristina Yang is one of them. Her colleagues are all very ecstatic for her nomination except for Meredith and Dr. Bailey. To mask her jealousy, Meredith makes a celebratory toast to Cristina. Dr. Bailey, however, is less efficient at hiding her feelings. Cristina's self-esteem takes a blow when her patient's family doubts her abilities and says that her best is bad. Alex tells Jo that he called to accept the offer from Dr. "Butt Hole" to work for his private practice. Derek and Callie take the next step in their research by getting baseline measurements of brain activity. Callie finds out that although she has a great life, one thing is holding her back from being truly happy: a baby. Callie tells Arizona she wants another baby, and Arizona says she wants one, too. Owen tells Cristina that he's looked at the other nominees' research, and he's confident that she'll win. Cristina agrees.
216	20	"Go It Alone"	Mark Jackson	Lauren Barnett	April 17, 2014	1020	8.45
It's the day before the winner of the Harper Avery award is honored, and Cristina plans to hang out with Meredith at Joe's and write her speech over a drink. Their plans are ruined when Cristina's transplant patients' parents argue and endanger their children's health. At the home front, the married couples deal with their personal issues: Callie and Arizona discuss who will carry their second child, April and Jackson have their first big fight, while Derek and Meredith struggle with balancing work and parenthood. Cristina, who goes to the Harper Avery award ceremony in Boston by herself as Owen and Meredith are both busy, has last second doubts about being there alone. After pulling herself together, she walks in to locate her table and sees that Owen and Meredith are both there. Unfortunately, Cristina does not win the Harper Avery award.
217	21	"Change of Heart"	Rob Greenlea	Meg Marinis	April 24, 2014	1021	7.99
Meredith, Owen, and Cristina all return to Grey Sloan Memorial Hospital after Cristina's loss at the Harper Avery award ceremony. April, still residing with Callie and Arizona, drives them nuts. She feels that her fight with Jackson is the end of their relationship. Jackson is feeling pressured to cut back on the hospital's research funds and projects and must decide whose research will be terminated. Richard travels across the country with plans to propose to Catherine Avery, but finds out the real reason why Cristina lost to her competition: because the hospital is owned by the Harper Avery Foundation, no doctor that works there will ever win the award. Meanwhile, back at Grey Sloan Memorial Hospital, Cristina is faced with the decision of which patient will get the heart transplant. Amelia, Derek's sister, makes a surprise visit to see if she can have the life Derek and Meredith have. Alex gives the board his notice that he’ll be accepting the private practice offer; April tells Jackson that they can’t forget about their "hypothetical" children per Jackson's request, because she's pregnant.
218	22	"We Are Never Ever Getting Back Together"	Rob Corn	Joan Rater	May 1, 2014	1022	8.81
In an attempt to get back at Catherine Avery, Webber calls an emergency board meeting, without Jackson. The board wants to appeal the Harper Avery award, which would have gone to Cristina if the Harper Avery Foundation didn't own her hospital. Hunt convinces Cristina to accept an invitation to speak at a hospital in Switzerland. During the lecture, a questioner from the back turns out to be none other than Dr. Preston Burke. Meanwhile, back at Grey Sloan Memorial Hospital, Amelia and Derek team up to work on conjoined twins who share a brain. Burke offers a job to Cristina while showing her his hospital, but it's not just a job working for him. Instead, it's his job. Jackson and April start to mend their broken relationship when he agrees to attend church with her and their baby, as long as she agrees to waffles afterwards. Callie and Arizona are thinking about baby names, Agamemnon being a favorite of Callie’s. Alex is loving his job at the private practice, but Jo is starting to sink under the pressure of her duties. The residents learn that someone amongst them is going to get fired. Stephanie figures out that Bailey administered the deactivated HIV virus to her bubble-boy patient, despite his parents' wishes, and thinks it's brilliant.
219	23	"Everything I Try to Do, Nothing Seems to Turn Out Right"	Bill D'Elia	Austin Guzman	May 8, 2014	1023	7.95
Dr. Bailey faces legal charges of assault and battery after she reveals to Braden's parents that she implemented the deactivated HIV treatment despite their wishes. In an attempt to get Cristina to stay at Grey Sloan Memorial Hospital, Owen puts Cristina in charge of screening applicants for the position of head of cardio. April and Jackson have their first OB/GYN visit, and decide not to tell anyone yet. Callie is heartbroken when she goes to the OB/GYN because it's revealed that she has too many adhesions from the car accident to be able to carry. Derek comes back from Washington, D.C. with news of a job offer to work at the National Institutes of Health (NIH) and a job offer for Meredith at James Madison Hospital. Amelia confides in Meredith that she wants to call off her engagement in order to move to Seattle. Dr. Webber tells Leah that she's not fit to be a surgeon, and consequently, cuts her from the residency program. First appearance of Dr. Maggie Pierce.
220	24	"Fear (Of the Unknown)"	Tony Phelan	William Harper	May 15, 2014	1024	8.92
The day has arrived that Cristina leaves for Zurich, but a possible act of terrorism delays her departure. Before she can get to the mall to buy a European phone charger, an explosion at the mall sends multiple injured victims to the Grey Sloan Memorial Hospital. Leah comes to the ER when she hears about the explosion, but leaves with no goodbyes when she sees every patient had been treated. April receives a pep talk from Catherine Avery when she starts to fear raising a baby in a world that is so dangerous. Cristina, looking for closure, can’t leave the hospital until she and Meredith dance it out one last time. Shane demands that he take control of his education and leaves to work under Cristina in Zurich. Meredith tells Derek that she can’t leave Seattle, the place where she grew up and made her life; she’s not going to Washington, D.C., despite what Derek says. Callie and Arizona consider having a surrogate mother carry their future baby after treating a surrogate who was burned by the explosion. Bailey is nominated for a position on the board by Webber due to Cristina’s departure; however, Cristina left Karev her shares of the hospital and her board position. Webber connects with Dr. Pierce, the new head of cardio, and finds out that her birth mother was Ellis Grey.

== Cast and characters ==
=== Main ===
- Ellen Pompeo as Dr. Meredith Grey
- Sandra Oh as Dr. Cristina Yang
- Justin Chambers as Dr. Alex Karev
- Chandra Wilson as Dr. Miranda Bailey
- James Pickens Jr. as Dr. Richard Webber
- Sara Ramirez as Dr. Callie Torres
- Kevin McKidd as Dr. Owen Hunt
- Jessica Capshaw as Dr. Arizona Robbins
- Sarah Drew as Dr. April Kepner
- Jesse Williams as Dr. Jackson Avery
- Camilla Luddington as Dr. Jo Wilson
- Gaius Charles as Dr. Shane Ross
- Jerrika Hinton as Dr. Stephanie Edwards
- Tessa Ferrer as Dr. Leah Murphy
- Patrick Dempsey as Dr. Derek Shepherd

=== Recurring ===
- Caterina Scorsone as Dr. Amelia Shepherd
- Kelly McCreary as Dr. Maggie Pierce
- Jason George as Dr. Ben Warren
- Debbie Allen as Dr. Catherine Avery
- James Remar as Jimmy Evans
- Justin Bruening as Matthew Taylor
- Marguerite Moreau as Dr. Emma Marling
- Nicole Cummins as Paramedic Nicole
- Rebecca Field as Sabine McNeil
- Thomas Barbusca as Link McNeil
- Armani Jackson as Braden Morris
- Jadin Gould as Ivy McNeil
- Harley Graham as Francesca "Frankie" McNeil
- Billy Malone as Jon McNeil
- Elizabeth Bond as Kimmie Kepner
- Emily Happe as Libby Kepner
- Grace Bannon as Alice Kepner

=== Notable guests ===
- Isaiah Washington as Dr. Preston Burke
- Tina Majorino as Dr. Heather Brooks
- Bobby Campo as Brian
- Heather Hemmens as Sasha
- Héctor Elizondo as Carlos Torres
- Patrick Fabian as Dr. Oliver Lebackes
- Gordon Clapp as Victor Kaufman
- Paul James as Eric
- Valerie Mahaffey as Donna Kaufman
- Keke Palmer as Cheryl Jeffries
- Lainie Kazan as C.J.
- Annie Potts as Joyce Bosco

== Production ==
=== Development ===
Grey's Anatomy was renewed for a tenth season on May 10, 2013. This season is to include the 200th episode of the series, the fourth episode to air, "Puttin' on the Ritz". This season was also split into 2 batches of episodes, each batch consisting of 12 uninterrupted episodes (excluding holidays). The mid-season premiere aired on February 27, 2014.

=== Casting ===
In May 2012, it was announced that 6 original castmates - Ellen Pompeo, Sandra Oh, Justin Chambers, Chandra Wilson, James Pickens, Jr. and Patrick Dempsey had renewed their contracts through season 10, as Meredith Grey, Cristina Yang, Alex Karev, Miranda Bailey, Richard Webber and Derek Shepherd respectively. It was revealed in June 2013, that 4 out of the 5 interns from Season 9 would be returning as series-regulars, including Camilla Luddington, Gaius Charles, Jerrika Hinton and Tessa Ferrer. It was announced in July 2013 that Bobby Campo and Heather Hemmens were slated to guest star in the 2-part season premiere. In August 2013, TVGuide reported that Dexter alum James Remar is set for a "mysterious" story-arc. It was later revealed that Remar would be playing Alex Karev's drug addict father, whom he hasn't seen in more than 20 years. In October 2013, it was announced that Hector Elizondo would be returning to the show, as Callie Torres' father, for a 'Callie-centric' episode that would air mid-November. Other guest stars in November were Valerie Mahaffey and Gordon Clapp.

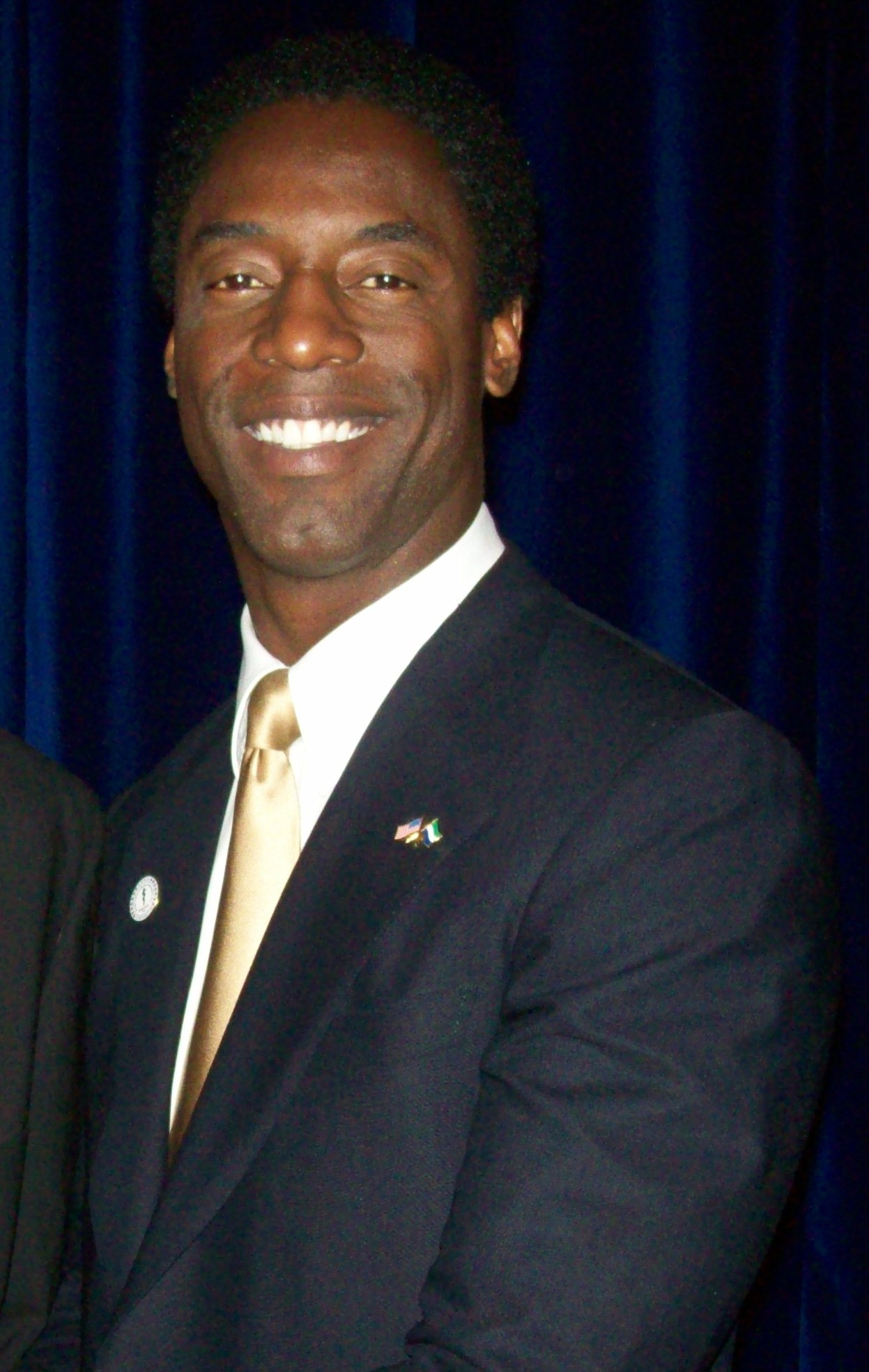
Isaiah Washington returned as Dr. Preston Burke for 1 episode to persuade Yang into taking over his hospital.

It was announced in January 2014 that Nickelodeon star Keke Palmer would guest star in an upcoming episode slated to air in March 2014. It was also announced that Greek alum Paul James had been cast in a potentially recurring role. It was also announced in January that the role of Zola (Meredith and Derek's daughter) was recast and would now be played by Heaven White, who is significantly older than Jela K. Moore, the actress who previously played Zola.

On March 6, 2014, it was revealed that Isaiah Washington would reprise his role as Preston Burke for 1 episode in May 2014. It is believed that his reappearance will have ties with Cristina Yang's (Sandra Oh) departure from the show after 9 years. Dr. Burke was Cristina Yang's love-interest for much of his 3 years on the show. Washington was fired 7 years ago after he made a homophobic slur against castmate, T. R. Knight. On March 18, 2014, it was announced that another Grey's Anatomy alum would return in May and stay until the end of the season. Caterina Scorsone will return to play Amelia Shepherd, one of Derek's 4 sisters. Scorsone was a regular on the Grey's Anatomy spin-off, Private Practice, where she also portrayed Amelia Shepherd.

In April, news broke that Kelly McCreary would guest star in the Season 10 finale. It wasn't known until the season finale aired that her character, Dr. Pierce, was hired by Dr. Yang to be the new head of cardio. It was also discovered at the end of the episode that Dr. Ellis Grey was her birth mother.

On August 13, 2013, Sandra Oh revealed that after the tenth season, she would be leaving Grey's Anatomy. It was announced on March 25, 2014, that Gaius Charles and Tessa Ferrer were not having their options picked up for Season 11, meaning that Season 10 would be their last season as regulars on the show. On January 23, 2014, it was announced that Ellen Pompeo and Patrick Dempsey had renewed their contracts for another 2 seasons, as Meredith Grey and Derek Shepherd respectively, meaning their characters will be staying on the medical drama for seasons 11 and 12. On May 2, 2014, it was announced that the rest of the 6 original castmates, Justin Chambers, Chandra Wilson, and James Pickens Jr., excluding Sandra Oh, had renewed their contracts for another 2 seasons (11 and 12). Sara Ramirez also renewed her contract for another 2 seasons.

== Reception ==
=== Ratings ===
Grey's Anatomy's tenth season opened up to 9.27 million viewers with a 3.4/9 Nielsen rating/share in the 18–49 demographic. "Everybody's Crying Mercy" served as the season's most-viewed episode. "Man On The Moon" was the season's least-viewed episode, with 7.02 million viewers and a 2.3/6 Nielsen rating/share in the 18-49 demographic. At the time, the season finale was the series lowest-watched season finale with 8.92 million viewers and 2.6/8 in the 18-49 rating demo. Grey's Anatomy, in its tenth season, ranked #15 overall in total viewers (12.12 million). This is 11 spots higher than the previous season, which was ranked #26. In the 18-49 key demographic, Grey's Anatomy ranked #5. The last time a season of Grey's Anatomy was ranked #5 in the 18-49 key demographic was season 1. The highest ranking for the 18-49 key demographic was #3 for seasons 3, 4, and 5. Last season, Grey's Anatomy was ranked #10. For the 2013-2014 primetime TV schedule, Grey's Anatomy was the #1 drama in the 18-49 key demographic.

==== Live + SD ratings ====
No. in series	No. in season	Episode	Air date	Time slot (EST)	Rating/Share (18–49)	Viewers (m)	18–49 Rank	Viewership rank	Drama rank
197	1	"Seal Our Fate"	September 26, 2013	Thursdays; 9:00 p.m.	3.4/9	9.27	14	—N/a	4
198	2	"I Want You With Me"	September 26, 2013	Thursdays; 9:00 p.m.	3.4/9	9.27	14	—N/a	4
199	3	"Everybody's Crying Mercy"	October 3, 2013	Thursdays; 9:00 p.m.	3.1/9	9.60	17	25	5
200	4	"Puttin' on the Ritz"	October 10, 2013	Thursdays; 9:00 p.m.	2.8/8	8.79	15	—N/a	5
201	5	"I Bet It Stung"	October 17, 2013	Thursdays; 9:00 p.m.	2.7/7	8.78	17	—N/a	6
202	6	"Map of You"	October 24, 2013	Thursdays; 9:00 p.m.	2.8/8	8.73	16	—N/a	4
203	7	"Thriller"	October 31, 2013	Thursdays; 9:00 p.m.	2.6/8	8.94	16	—N/a	5
204	8	"Two Against One"	November 7, 2013	Thursdays; 9:00 p.m.	2.7/7	8.68	13	—N/a	4
205	9	"Sorry Seems to be the Hardest Word"	November 14, 2013	Thursdays; 9:00 p.m.	2.6/7	8.56	16	—N/a	6
206	10	"Somebody That I Used to Know"	November 21, 2013	Thursdays; 9:00 p.m.	2.6/7	8.61	16	—N/a	4
207	11	"Man on the Moon"	December 5, 2013	Thursdays; 9:00 p.m.	2.3/6	7.02	23	—N/a	4
208	12	"Get Up, Stand Up"	December 12, 2013	Thursdays; 9:00 p.m.	2.7/8	8.36	13	25	3
209	13	"Take It Back"	February 27, 2014	Thursdays; 9:00 p.m.	3.1/9	9.42	11	19	3
210	14	"You Got to Hide Your Love Away"	March 6, 2014	Thursdays; 9:00 p.m.	2.6/7	8.21	14	—N/a	5
211	15	"Throwing it All Away"	March 13, 2014	Thursdays; 9:00 p.m.	2.3/7	7.36	17	—N/a	6
212	16	"We Gotta Get Out of This Place"	March 20, 2014	Thursdays; 9:00 p.m.	2.4/7	8.09	10	21	5
213	17	"Do You Know?"	March 27, 2014	Thursdays; 9:00 p.m.	2.6/7	8.42	9	19	3
214	18	"You Be Illin'"	April 3, 2014	Thursdays; 9:00 p.m.	2.7/8	8.28	10	22	3
215	19	"I'm Winning"	April 10, 2014	Thursdays; 9:00 p.m.	2.6/8	8.18	8	23	3
216	20	"Go It Alone"	April 17, 2014	Thursdays; 9:00 p.m.	2.6/8	8.45	5	16	2
217	21	"Change of Heart"	April 24, 2014	Thursdays; 9:00 p.m.	2.3/7	7.99	9	21	2
218	22	"We Are Never Ever Getting Back Together"	May 1, 2014	Thursdays; 9:00 p.m.	2.6/8	8.81	7	18	2
219	23	"Everything I Try to Do, Nothing Seems to Turn Out Right"	May 8, 2014	Thursdays; 9:00 p.m.	2.5/7	7.95	7	23	3
220	24	"Fear (of the Unknown)"	May 15, 2014	Thursdays; 9:00 p.m.	2.6/8	8.92	10	20	4

==== Live + 7 Day (DVR) ratings ====
No. in series	No. in season	Episode	Air date	Time slot (EST)	18–49 rating increase	Viewers (millions) increase	Total 18-49	Total viewers (millions)	Ref
197	1	"Seal Our Fate"	September 26, 2013	Thursdays; 9:00 p.m.	1.7	3.89	5.1	13.16	
198	2	"I Want You With Me"	September 26, 2013	Thursdays; 9:00 p.m.	1.7	3.89	5.1	13.16	
199	3	"Everybody's Crying Mercy"	October 3, 2013	Thursdays; 9:00 p.m.	1.8	4.02	4.9	13.62	
200	4	"Puttin' on the Ritz"	October 10, 2013	Thursdays; 9:00 p.m.	1.8	3.91	4.6	12.71	
201	5	"I Bet It Stung"	October 17, 2013	Thursdays; 9:00 p.m.	2.1	4.20	4.8	12.98	
202	6	"Map of You"	October 24, 2013	Thursdays; 9:00 p.m.	1.8	3.93	4.6	12.67	
203	7	"Thriller"	October 31, 2013	Thursdays; 9:00 p.m.	2.0	4.07	4.6	13.01	
204	8	"Two Against One"	November 7, 2013	Thursdays; 9:00 p.m.	1.9	4.07	4.6	12.74	
205	9	"Sorry Seems to be the Hardest Word"	November 14, 2013	Thursdays; 9:00 p.m.	2.0	4.22	4.6	12.78	
206	10	"Somebody That I Used to Know"	November 21, 2013	Thursdays; 9:00 p.m.	1.8	3.65	4.4	12.26	
207	11	"Man on the Moon"	December 5, 2013	Thursdays; 9:00 p.m.	1.8	4.14	4.1	11.23	
208	12	"Get Up, Stand Up"	December 12, 2013	Thursdays; 9:00 p.m.	1.8	3.97	4.5	12.31	
209	13	"Take It Back"	February 27, 2014	Thursdays; 9:00 p.m.	1.8	4.08	4.9	13.51	
210	14	"You Got to Hide Your Love Away"	March 6, 2014	Thursdays; 9:00 p.m.	1.8	3.98	4.4	12.20	
211	15	"Throwing it All Away"	March 13, 2014	Thursdays; 9:00 p.m.	1.9	4.11	4.2	11.45	
212	16	"We Gotta Get Out of This Place"	March 20, 2014	Thursdays; 9:00 p.m.	1.9	4.01	4.3	12.10	
213	17	"Do You Know?"	March 27, 2014	Thursdays; 9:00 p.m.	1.8	3.66	4.4	12.08	
214	18	"You Be Illin"	April 3, 2014	Thursdays; 9:00 p.m.	1.5	3.43	4.1	11.50	
215	19	"I'm Winning"	April 10, 2014	Thursdays; 9:00 p.m.	1.9	3.96	4.5	12.14	
216	20	"Go It Alone"	April 17, 2014	Thursdays; 9:00 p.m.	1.8	3.75	4.4	12.20	
217	21	"Change of Heart"	April 24, 2014	Thursdays; 9:00 p.m.	1.6	3.50	3.9	11.49	
218	22	"We Are Never Ever Getting Back Together"	May 1, 2014	Thursdays; 9:00 p.m.	1.8	3.94	4.4	12.75	
219	23	"Everything I Try to Do, Nothing Seems to Turn Out Right"	May 8, 2014	Thursdays; 9:00 p.m.	1.5	3.33	4.0	11.27	
220	24	"Fear (of the Unknown)"	May 15, 2014	Thursdays; 9:00 p.m.	1.5	3.43	4.1	12.34	

=== Critical response ===
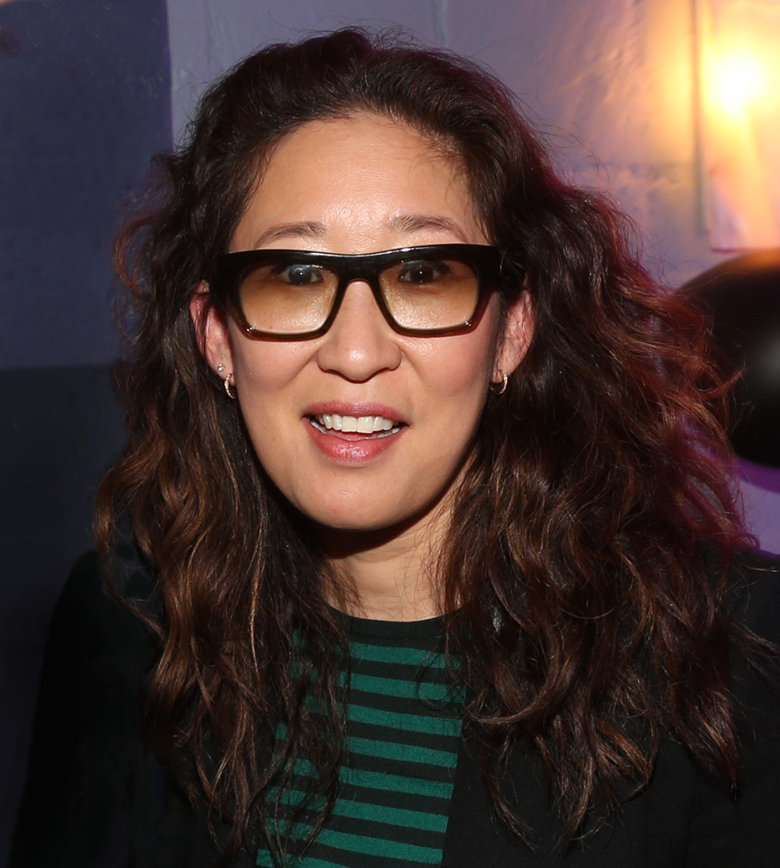
Many critics saw Sandra Oh's performance as Cristina Yang throughout the season as worthy of a Primetime Emmy Award nomination

The tenth season of the medical-drama received positive reviews from the critics with many referring to the season as a return to form for the long-running show. The season holds a 100% positive score on Rotten Tomatoes and a "Fresh" rating. Annie Barett of Entertainment Weekly gave a positive review to the season and wrote, "There's true sorrow here along with the passion, which keeps their dynamic so intriguing to me."

The A.V. Club also praised the tenth season of the show stating, "At its best, Grey's Anatomy is about everyday bravery, sacrifice, and courage. At its worst, it's a melodramatic, moralizing soap opera. Both sides are on display as the show heads confidently into its tenth season."

The Loop also acknowledged the return to form giving a positive review, "After a shaky start to its tenth season, Grey's Anatomy has picked up the pace over the past 2 episodes and is once again showing a great deal of promise that it can revive itself after nearly a decade on the air."

Many sources, including Rachel Simon of Bustle and Nicole Pomarico of Wetpaint, claimed that Sandra Oh's performance during her tenth and final season on Grey's Anatomy is worthy of an Emmy nomination. Simon stated "She made us care about Grey’s in a way we hadn’t in years, bringing us into Cristina’s life and mind, fully and ferociously. The show has been good for several seasons now; because of Oh’s performance this year, it once again became great."

On Oh's exit Entertainment Weekly wrote, "Cristina and Meredith is the friendship to end all friendships—some would even argue it’s what the show is about. Cristina is Meredith’s person. How could she possibly function without Cristina in her life? More than that, Cristina on her own was a great character. She didn’t want kids, she didn’t need a man, and she’d rather receive compliments on her brain instead of her beauty. She was everything we needed in a character—and more. Seeing her go was devastating."

== DVD release ==
Grey's Anatomy: The Complete Tenth Season - Live For The Moments
Set Details		Special Features
24 Episodes (1 extended); 6-Disc Set; English (Dolby Digital 5.1 Surround); Subtitles: English SDH, Spanish & French; Audio Commentaries		Extended Episode - "Do You Know?"; An Immeasurable Gift: Sandra Oh; Medical, Medical: A Tutorial on Medical Procedures for TV; Deleted Scenes; In Stitches: Season 10 Outtakes
Release Dates
Region 1	Region 2	Region 4
September 2, 2014	November 3, 2014	October 8, 2014
