= Isaiah Hill =

American model, actor

- Born: Isaiah Rahsaan Hill; October 2, 2002 (age 23); South Orange, New Jersey, U.S.
- Occupations: Model; actor
- Years active: 2021–present
- Relatives: Lauryn Hill (aunt); YG Marley (cousin); Selah Marley (cousin)

Isaiah Rahsaan Hill (born October 2, 2002) is an American model and actor. He is best known for his role as Jace Carson in the Apple TV+ series Swagger, a sports drama loosely based on the experiences of Kevin Durant in the world of youth basketball.

== Life and career ==
Isaiah Hill was born in South Orange, New Jersey. His father Malaney Hill, is the brother of musician and actress Lauryn Hill, and his mother Felicia, is a marketer. His cousins are model Selah Marley and reggae artist YG Marley. As a child, he made a brief appearance on the American television series Sesame Street. He played high school basketball for Columbia High School and Union Catholic Regional High School.

In 2021, Hill landed his first acting role as Jace Carson, a character loosely based on Kevin Durant, in the Apple TV+ sports drama Swagger. The series ran for two seasons before being cancelled by Apple in 2023. In 2022, Hill and the main cast of Swagger were recognized by the African-American Film Critics Association (AAFCA), winning the Best Ensemble Award at the AAFCA Awards.

== Filmography ==
Year	Title	Role	Notes	Ref.
2021–2023	Swagger	Jace Carson	Main role	
2026	One Spoon of Chocolate	Lonnie Joneson	Post-production	
TBA	Myron Bolitar	Jayden Elder	Recurring role, upcoming series	
