= Dark Harvest (2023 film) =

2023 film by David Slade

- Theatrical release poster
- Directed by: David Slade
- Screenplay by: Michael Gilio
- Based on: Dark Harvest by Norman Partridge
- Produced by: Matt Tolmach; David Manpearl
- Starring: Casey Likes; E'myri Crutchfield; Dustin Ceithamer; Elizabeth Reaser; Jeremy Davies
- Cinematography: Larry Smith
- Edited by: Art Jones
- Music by: Brian Reitzell
- Production company: Matt Tolmach Productions
- Distributed by: Metro-Goldwyn-Mayer Pictures
- Release dates: October 11, 2023 (Alamo Drafthouse Cinema); October 13, 2023
- Running time: 96 minutes
- Country: United States
- Language: English

Dark Harvest is a 2023 American fantasy horror film directed by David Slade and written by Michael Gilio, loosely based on the 2006 novel of the same name by Norman Partridge. It stars Casey Likes, E'myri Crutchfield, Dustin Ceithamer, Elizabeth Reaser, and Jeremy Davies.

Dark Harvest was theatrically released exclusively in select Alamo Drafthouse Cinema theaters for one night on October 11, 2023, before being released digitally on October 13.

== Plot ==
In 1962, the teenage boys of a small rural town compete in the annual Halloween "Run": they must stop a deadly supernatural creature known as Sawtooth Jack from reaching the church before midnight. This year, Jim Shepard kills the creature and leads the boys in feasting on its candy innards, winning $25,000 and a new Chevrolet Corvette from the Harvesters Guild. As the town celebrates, Jim says goodbye to his younger brother Richie and drives away to a new life.

One year later, Officer Ricks lectures the boys about the Run; only Richie is exempt, as his family has already won. Richie flirts with Kelly, a newcomer to town, and is determined to take part in the Run, despite his parents' attempts to dissuade him. Beaten up by his bullying classmate Riley, who steals his belt, Richie is troubled by postcards and a letter from Jim. He tries to leave town in a stolen car, but is subdued by Ricks.

Meanwhile, a farmer turns an emaciated corpse into a scarecrow with a carved pumpkin for a head, sewing candy inside the body before it rises as Sawtooth Jack. As is tradition, the town's boys are locked in their rooms and starved for three days until they are let loose on Halloween, taking to the streets with masks and makeshift weapons. Richie sneaks out to join the Run with his friends Mitch, Bud, and Charlie, chasing Sawtooth Jack into a cornfield. The creature kills Charlie and Mitch, but seems to let Richie escape.

Richie finds Kelly, who has joined the hunt herself, and a traumatized Bud flees back to town. His parents refuse to let him inside, and he pleads with a group of boys hiding in a storm cellar, but Sawtooth Jack arrives and kills Bud and the others. Richie and Kelly steal a handgun from Ricks' house and his patrol car, while the increasingly feral boys begin looting and killing townspeople and each other. Accosted by Riley, Kelly knocks him unconscious and Richie reclaims his belt buckle.

Ricks uses his car's radio to lure Richie and Kelly to the center of town, where they find Sawtooth Jack. Preparing to shoot the creature, Richie recognizes its matching belt buckle and realizes this year's Sawtooth Jack is Jim. The creature escapes, and Richie and Kelly confront his mother Donna, deducing that she wrote Jim's postcards and letters. Overwhelmed with guilt, Donna stabs herself in the neck; across town, Ricks warns Richie's father Dan that the Run must be completed to prevent the town's ruination.

Richie and Kelly reach the church, where Dan reveals the town's curse: Ricks and the Harvesters Guild keep anyone from leaving, ensuring every year that Sawtooth Jack is stopped, while the new winner is transformed into the following year's creature. Richie guides Sawtooth Jack to the church to put an end to the ritual, but Ricks arrives with Riley, who shoots Sawtooth Jack. Richie holds Riley at gunpoint, but Sawtooth Jack indicates that he wants Richie to kill him, and Richie finishes his brother off with a shot to the head.

Amid the town's celebration, Richie and Kelly agree to escape together, and she slips him a gun. Presented with his winnings, Richie takes his new car to meet Kelly, but they are stopped by Ricks as Kelly hides. Taken to the scarecrow field, Richie shoots first and kills Ricks, but is ambushed by the farmer and buried alive. At Dan's urging, the devastated Kelly escapes from town in Richie's car. The following year, as Richie's body is transformed into Sawtooth Jack, Dan intervenes, killing the farmer and urging his newly risen son to take revenge on the town.

== Cast ==
- Casey Likes as Richie Shepard
- E'myri Crutchfield as Kelly Haines
- Luke Kirby as Officer Jerry Ricks
- Dustin Ceithamer as Sawtooth Jack / October Boy
- Dylan McEwan as Curly Stooge
- Elizabeth Reaser as Donna Shepard
- Jeremy Davies as Dan Shepard
- Britain Dalton as Jim Shepard
- West Mulholland as Mitch Crenshaw
- Steven McCarthy as Coach Nelson

== Production ==
In September 2019, it was reported that New Regency hired David Slade to direct the adaptation of Norman Partridge's 2006 novel, Dark Harvest, with Michael Gilio writing the script and Matt Tolmach and David Manpearl producing. On February 23, 2020, it was reported that Metro-Goldwyn-Mayer acquired the film after New Regency put it on turnaround, and Gilio will also executive produce the film.

In June 2021, it was reported newcomers Casey Likes and E'myri Crutchfield were cast in the lead roles. Later, it was revealed that Jeremy Davies, Elizabeth Reaser and Luke Kirby were added to the cast.

Principal photography was slated to begin in August 2021.

== Release ==
Dark Harvest was released digitally on October 13, 2023, following a one night only screening in select Alamo Drafthouse Cinema locations on October 11, 2023. It was previously scheduled to be released on September 24, 2021, and September 9, 2022.

=== Critical reception ===
On the review aggregator website Rotten Tomatoes, 67% of 42 critics' reviews are positive, with an average rating of 6/10. The site's consensus reads: "The satisfyingly spooky Dark Harvest might have been scarier, but it wrings some stylish chills out of its intriguing premise". Metacritic assigned the film a weighted average score of 51 out of 100 based on four critics, indicating "mixed or average" reviews.

== See also ==
- List of films set around Halloween
