= Kwik Stop =

American road movie directed by Michael Gilio

- Directed by: Michael Gilio
- Written by: Michael Gilio
- Produced by: Rachel Tenner
- Starring: Lara Phillips; Michael Gilio; Karin Anglin; Rich Komenich
- Cinematography: David Blood
- Edited by: Chris McKay
- Music by: Daniel Teper
- Distributed by: Facets Multi-Media (theatrical) iFilm (DVD); Giant Pictures (digital)
- Release date: 2001
- Running time: 110 minutes
- Country: United States
- Language: English

Kwik Stop is a 2001 American independent road film written and directed by Michael Gilio. The feature film stars Lara Phillips, opposite Gilio, along with Karin Anglin and Rich Komenich. The film had its world premiere at the Los Angeles Independent Film Festival on April 21, 2001.

== Plot ==
Lucky (Michael Gilio) is an aspiring actor on his way to Hollywood. He makes one last stop near his hometown at a Kwik Stop, where teenage local Didi (Lara Phillips) catches him shoplifting and blackmails him into letting her come along to California. The two of them spend their first night together in the honeymoon suite of a roadside motel, where they smoke pot, have sex, and proclaim deep love for one another. When Didi wakes up in an empty bed the next morning, Lucky and Didi’s tumultuous journey has truly begun.

== Cast ==
- Lara Phillips as Didi
- Michael Gilio as Lucky
- Karin Anglin as Ruthie
- Rich Komenich as Emil
- Sunny Siegel as Sunny
- Guy Barile as Ticket Teller
- Pat McCartney as Bartender
- Margaret Kusterman as Bev
- Christian Stolte as Cop #1
- James Ike Eichling as Cop #2
- Margaret Travolta as Juvie Nurse
- Caitlin Hart as Motel Owner
- Bob Brueler as Judge

== Production ==
The film was shot in the Chicago area on Super 16 film, over a period of 18 days.

== Release ==
The film was a mainstay on the international film festival circuit for several years, officially selected by festivals such as South by Southwest, the Chicago International Film Festival, Karlovy Vary International Film Festival, the Buenos Aires International Festival of Independent Cinema, and Roger Ebert's Overlooked Film Festival.

The film had a limited theatrical run at Facets Multi-Media in Chicago, released on DVD through iFilm, and distributed digitally by Giant Pictures.

== Critical reception ==
Kwik Stop has a 100% Rotten Tomatoes approval rating based on 5 critics reviews. Roger Ebert of the Chicago Sun Times was an early champion of the film, he gave it 3.5 out of 4 stars, praising its humor and emotional impact, calling it “bold, fresh, and totally original. One of the unsung treasures of recent independent filmmaking." Ebert himself presented the movie at his Ebertfest in Champagne-Urbana.

Scott Tobias of The A.V. Club was impressed with its atmosphere and genre-busting narrative despite its budgetary limitations: “Kwik Stop captures the rhythms and language of its Midwestern locale with rare fidelity, oscillating between quirky comedy and weighty drama; the film’s wayward tone is hard to pin down, but it’s also a testament to Gilio’s ability to shift naturally from one tone to another without losing his footing.” Jonathan Rosenbaum of the Chicago Reader described the film's plot as cryptic and unpredictable, saying that he was "tempted to call it an experimental film masquerading as something more conventional." Joshua Land of the Village Voice said “unabashedly movie-conscious and quietly formalist, Gilio’s allusive yet original Kwik Stop nails the details,” while Michael Wilmington of the Chicago Tribune called Kwik Stop “a funny, evocative and constantly surprising low budget anti-road movie. One of the year’s best American indies; you won’t forget it soon.”

Despite its positive reception, Kwik Stop is not well-known, its struggle for wider distribution detailed in Charles Taylor’s Slate article, Kwik Stop, "An indie scene that can find no place for a Kwik Stop because it has no stars, because it is too original, is an indie scene that should be taken behind the barn with a shotgun."

== Awards ==
Gilio was nominated for an Independent Spirit Award in 2001 as "Someone to Watch", and won the "Best Director" prize at the Buenos Aires International Festival of Independent Cinema.
