= Spinning Gold =

- Theatrical release poster
- Directed by: Timothy Scott Bogart
- Written by: Timothy Scott Bogart
- Produced by: Timothy Scott Bogart; Laurence Mark; Chris Torto; Jessica Martins; Gary A. Randall
- Starring: Jeremy Jordan; Michelle Monaghan; Jay Pharoah; Lyndsy Fonseca; Dan Fogler; Peyton List; James Wolk; Jason Isaacs
- Cinematography: Byron Werner
- Edited by: Derek Ambrosi
- Music by: Evan Bogart; Justin Grey
- Production companies: Hero Entertainment; The Boardwalk Entertainment Group; Madmana Studios; Carioca Capital Partners; Blue Rider Pictures; Bay Point Media
- Distributed by: Hero Entertainment; Howling Wolf Films
- Release date: March 31, 2023
- Running time: 137 minutes
- Country: United States
- Language: English
- Box office: $66,284

Spinning Gold is a 2023 American biographical drama film written and directed by Timothy Scott Bogart. It is based on the life of his father, Casablanca Records founder Neil Bogart.

== Premise ==
The film depicts the life and career of record producer and Casablanca Records founder Neil Bogart, who was credited with discovering many musical acts such as Donna Summer, Kiss, Village People, Cameo; and signing acts including the Pips (without Gladys Knight), Cher and Parliament.

== Cast ==
- Jeremy Jordan as Neil Bogart
  - Winslow Fegley as young Neil Bogart
- Michelle Monaghan as Elizabeth "Beth" Weiss, Neil's first wife
- Jay Pharoah as Cecil Holmes
- Lyndsy Fonseca as Joyce Biawitz, Neil's second wife
- Dan Fogler as Buck Reingold
- Peyton List as Nancy Weiss, Beth's younger sister and Buck's wife
- James Wolk as Larry Harris
- Michael Ian Black as Bill Aucoin
- Chris Redd as Frankie Crocker
- Sebastian Maniscalco as Giorgio Moroder
- Jason Isaacs as Al Bogatz
- Sam Harris as Paul Stanley
- Casey Likes as Gene Simmons
- Ledisi as Gladys Knight
- Alex Gaskarth as Peter Criss
  - Matt Greiner as Peter Criss in performances
- Pink Sweat$ as Bill Withers
- Wiz Khalifa as George Clinton
- Jason Derulo as Ron Isley
- Tayla Parx as Donna Summer
- Caylee Cowan as Farrah Lee
- Vincent Pastore as Big Joey

== Production ==
The project was originally announced in September 2011, with Timothy Scott Bogart writing and directing the feature about his late father. Justin Timberlake was cast as Bogart. In October 2013, Spike Lee was in talks to direct the film. In January 2014, the film was delayed due to the Envision Entertainment scandal.

In June 2019, Deadline reported that Timothy Bogart would direct the film, with Jeremy Jordan now cast as Bogart, and Samuel L. Jackson, Kenan Thompson, Jason Isaacs and Jason Derulo amongst the extensive cast. Richard Dreyfuss and Sebastian Maniscalco were added to the cast in August. In June 2021, new cast members were announced, including Wiz Khalifa replacing Jackson and newcomer Casey Likes playing Gene Simmons.

Filming began on July 16, 2019, in Montreal and at Kearny Point, with plans to wrap on September 20. On August 23, Canadian actors' union ACTRA issued a "Do Not Work" order forbidding its members from working on the film, alleging the producers were "unfair engagers for failure to meet payroll obligations." As of June 17, 2021, filming had begun in New Jersey.

== Release ==
The film was released in theaters on March 31, 2023.

== Reception ==
On the review aggregator website Rotten Tomatoes, 30% of 47 critics' reviews are positive, with an average rating of 4.6/10. The website's consensus reads: "A fairly flat telling of a true story that was far more colorful and entertaining in real life, Spinning Gold is destined for the cutout bin." Metacritic, which uses a weighted average, assigned the film a score of 42 out of 100, based on 10 critics, indicating "mixed or average" reviews.
