= Casey Likes =

American actor (born 2001)

- Born: December 25, 2001 (age 24); Chandler, Arizona, U.S.
- Education: Chandler High School
- Occupation: Actor
- Years active: 2010–present

Casey Likes (born December 25, 2001) is an American actor. He originated the role of William Miller in the musical theatre adaptation of the film Almost Famous in 2019 and on Broadway in 2022, and he played Marty McFly in the 2023 Broadway production of Back to the Future: The Musical. From 2025 to 2026, he starred as J. D. in the off-Broadway revival of Heathers.

== Early life ==
Likes was raised in Chandler, Arizona. His mother, Stephanie Likes, is also an actor and appeared in Les Misérables on Broadway and on a national tour.

Likes performed in school and community theatre in and around his hometown. He attended Chandler High School, where, in 2019, he starred as Jean Valjean in the school's production of Les Misérables, winning Best Lead Male at the 2019 ASU Gammage High School Musical Theatre Awards. As a result, Likes was a contestant in that year's Jimmy Awards in New York City, where he was selected as one of the eight finalists.

== Career ==
His first professional stage role was William Miller in the musical Almost Famous at the Old Globe Theatre in San Diego, California. The production ran from September to October 2019. When it transferred to Broadway at the Bernard B. Jacobs Theatre from November 2022 to January 2023, Likes again played William Miller, garnering a 2023 Theatre World Award. He appears on the cast recording.

Between his two runs in Almost Famous, Likes appeared in season 2 of Crypt TV's web series The Birch as Brian Moses (2021). In 2021, he wrote, directed and acted in a short film titled Thespians, also starring Sydney Lucas, Andrew Barth Feldman, Rob McClure, and Antonio Cipriano. Likes starred as Richie Shepherd in the MGM horror film Dark Harvest (2023). He also played Gene Simmons, the bassist and co-lead singer of Kiss, in the Neil Bogart biopic Spinning Gold (2023).

Likes starred as Marty McFly in Back to the Future: The Musical at the Winter Garden Theatre on Broadway from June 2023 until it closed on January 5, 2025. For this performance he was nominated for an Outer Critics Circle Award for Outstanding Lead Performer in a Broadway Musical.

In 2024, he appeared on Eisa Davis and Lin-Manuel Miranda's musical concept album Warriors, singing the role of Jesse. He directed and starred as Melchior Gabor in a production of Spring Awakening at Greasepaint Youtheatre in Scottsdale, Arizona, from April 4 to 13, 2025.

Likes starred as J. D. in the off-Broadway revival of Heathers at New World Stages from June 2025 to April 2026.

== Filmography ==
=== Film and television ===
As an actor
Year	Title	Role	Notes
2010	Everything Must Go	Young Nick in 1969	
2010	Cowboys vs. Vampires	Steve	
2013	American Blackout	Hank, Jr.	TV movie
2015	Thrasherland	Carpenter	Short film
2018	Krampus: Origins	Billy	
2021	The Birch	Brian Moses	Web series, 4 episodes
2021	Thespians	Mike	Short film; also writer, director and producer
2023	Spinning Gold	Gene Simmons	
2023	Dark Harvest	Richie Shepard	
2026	Sheriff Country	Paul	

As a filmmaker
Year	Title	Role	Notes
2020	I Got You	writer, director, producer and cinematographer	Short film

=== Stage ===
Year	Show	Role	Theatre	Notes
2019	Almost Famous	William Miller	Old Globe Theatre	Pre-Broadway production
2022	The Outsiders	Ponyboy Curtis	n/a	Workshop production
2022–2023	Almost Famous	William Miller	Bernard B. Jacobs Theatre	Broadway debut
2023–2025	Back to the Future: The Musical	Marty McFly	Winter Garden Theatre	Broadway
2025	Spring Awakening	Melchior Gabor	Greasepaint Theater	Regional; Also director
2025–2026	Heathers: The Musical	Jason “J.D.” Dean	New World Stages	Off-Broadway

== Awards and nominations ==
Stage
Year	Award	Category	Work	Result	Ref.
2023	Theatre World Award		Almost Famous	Honored	
2024	Outer Critics Circle Award	Outstanding Lead Performer in a Broadway Musical	Back to the Future: The Musical	Nominated	
2026	Dorian Award	Outstanding Featured Performance in an Off-Broadway Production	Heathers	Nominated	
