= Alex Hall =

Alec, Alex or Alexander Hall may refer to:

== People ==
- Alec Hall (Australian footballer) (1869–1953), Australian rules footballer
- Alec Hall (English footballer) (1909–1992), English footballer
- Alex Hall (actress) (born 1949), British actress
- Alex Hall (American football) (born 1985), American football player
- Alex Hall (author) (born 1990), American author
- Alex Hall (baseball) (born 1999), Australian baseball player
- Alex Hall (footballer, born 1908) (1908–1991), Scottish footballer
- Alex Hall (skier) (born 1998), American freestyle skier
- Alexander Hall (director) (1894–1968), American film director, composer, and theater actor
- Alexander Hall (footballer, born 1880) (1880–1943), Canadian soccer player
- Alexander William Hall (1838–1919), English Conservative politician

== Other uses ==
- Alexander Hall and Sons, a shipbuilding company in Aberdeen, Scotland
- Alexander Hall (Princeton University), an assembly hall at Princeton University
- Alexander Hall of the Winter Palace, St Petersburg
