= Tessa Ferrer =

American actress

- Born: Tessa Rose Ferrer; March 30, 1986 (age 40); Los Angeles, California, U.S.
- Occupation: Actress
- Years active: 2006–present
- Mother: Debby Boone
- Relatives: José Ferrer (grandfather); Rosemary Clooney (grandmother); Pat Boone (grandfather); Cherry Boone (aunt); Miguel Ferrer (uncle); George Clooney (first cousin, once removed); Red Foley (great-grandfather)

Tessa Rose Ferrer (born March 30, 1986) is an American film, TV, and stage actress.

== Early life and family ==
Ferrer was born in Los Angeles, California. She is the daughter of singer Debby Boone and, through her father Gabriel Ferrer, the granddaughter of actor José Ferrer and actress/ singer Rosemary Clooney.

== Career ==
In 2012, Shonda Rhimes cast Ferrer in a recurring role as Leah Murphy in season nine of the ABC drama series Grey's Anatomy. However, in March 2014, it was announced that she would be exiting the show at the end of season ten. In 2016, Ferrer returned to her role as Leah Murphy in episode six of season thirteen.

In 2014, Ferrer had a recurring role in the CBS series Extant. In 2015, she had recurring role in season two of the FXX comedy series You're the Worst. In 2016, Shonda Rhimes hired her again for a hybrid sitcom that ultimately didn’t get picked up.

In 2018, she was brought onto the film Insidious: The Last Key to play Audrey Rainier, mother of the main character Elise. That same year, she played Cora Babineau in Stephen King and David E. Kelly’s TV series Mr. Mercedes.

In 2019, she played Nurse Duckett in the Catch-22 miniseries, followed by playing Meg Bailey, a youth basketball coach, in Swagger for Apple TV+, from 2021 to 2023.

In 2024, she was cast in a recurring role on the Ryan Murphy TV series Grotesquerie.

== Filmography ==
=== Film ===
Year	Title	Role	Notes
2008	Excision	Pauline	Short film Won Craft Award for Acting at First Run Film Festival; Best Actress in Horror Genre at ShockerFest International Film Festival
2009	Nobody’s Night	Nora	Short film
2009	Ramblin' Round	Fighting Woman	Short film; voice role
2010	Red Rare Veins		Short film
2012	Modern Mad Men	Jessica	Short film
2012	After the Triumph of Your Birth	Eva	
2013	Go for Sisters	Katrina	as Tessa Rose Ferrer
2013	Abducted	Jessica Marino	
2018	Insidious: The Last Key	Audrey Rainier	
2018	The Passing Parade	Errol Larson	Also producer

=== Television ===
Year	Title	Role	Notes
2012–14, 2016–17	Grey's Anatomy	Leah Murphy	Recurring role in seasons 9 & 13; main role in season 10 (45 episodes)
2014	Extant	Katie Sparks	Recurring role (6 episodes)
2015	You're the Worst	Nina Keune	Recurring role (5 episodes)
2016	Toast	Jules	TV film
2018	Mr. Mercedes	Cora Babineau	Main role, season 2
2019	Catch-22	Sue Ann Duckett	Recurring role
2021-2023	Swagger	Coach Meg	Main role, seasons 1 & 2
2024	Grotesquerie	Grace Finn	Recurring role (2 episodes)
2025	All's Fair	Ann Ford	Episode: "Oh, Jesus!"
2026-present	The Agency	Robyn Crawford	Recurring role (5 episodes)
