= Norman Partridge =

American novelist

- Born: May 28, 1958 (age 68); Vallejo, California, U.S.
- Occupations: Novelist, short story writer
- Writing career
- Period: 1989–present
- Genres: Literary fiction, horror fiction

Norman Partridge (born May 28, 1958) is an American writer of horror and mystery fiction. He has written two detective novels about retired boxer Jack Baddalach, Saguaro Riptide and The Ten Ounce Siesta. He is also the author of a Crow novel, The Crow: Wicked Prayer, which was adapted in 2005 into the fourth Crow movie, bearing the same name.

Mr. Partridge's 2006 novel Dark Harvest, published in a limited edition of 2000 autographed copies and 24 lettered edition copies by Cemetery Dance Publications, was voted one of Publishers Weekly's 100 Best Books of 2006. It also won the 2006 Bram Stoker Award for Best Long Fiction, and has been nominated for two more awards in 2007. Dark Harvest was made into a film in 2023.

His short stories are collected in the volumes Mr. Fox and Other Feral Tales, Bad Intentions, and The Man with the Barbed Wire Fists.

Partridge works as the library's evening circulation supervisor at Saint Mary's College of California. He gave a campus reading of Dark Harvest on October 30, 2019.

In October 2010, Cemetery Dance announced the "Four Days of Halloween" Limited Edition promotional offer, where from October 29, 2010, to November 1, 2010, they would be offering 10/31: The Butcher's Tale by Norman Partridge, setting the print run at however many books were ordered in that window. As of July, 2022, there has been no development on this book, and apparently no plans from Partridge to deliver a manuscript.

== Awards, nominations, and honors ==
Work	Year & Award	Category	Result	Ref.
Mr. Fox and Other Feral Tales	1992 Bram Stoker Award	Fiction Collection	Won	
Mr. Fox and Other Feral Tales	1993 World Fantasy Award	Collection	Nominated	
Mr. Fox and Other Feral Tales	1993 Locus Award	Collection	Nominated	
Mr. Fox and Other Feral Tales	2005 International Horror Guild Award	Non-Fiction	Nominated	
Bad Intentions	1997 World Fantasy Award	Collection	Nominated	
Bad Intentions	1996 International Horror Guild Award	Collection	Nominated	
The Man with the Barbed-Wire Fists	2001 Bram Stoker Award	Fiction Collection	Won	
The Man with the Barbed-Wire Fists	2001 International Horror Guild Award	Collection	Nominated	
The Man with the Barbed-Wire Fists	2002 Locus Award	Collection	Nominated	
Dark Harvest	Publishers Weekly's 100 Best Books of 2006		Selected	
Dark Harvest	2006 Bram Stoker Award	Long Fiction	Won	
Dark Harvest	2006 International Horror Guild Award	Long Fiction	Won	
Dark Harvest	2007 World Fantasy Award	Novella	Nominated	
Dark Harvest	2007 Black Quill Award	Small Press Chill	Nominated	
The Bars on Satan's Jailhouse	1995 International Horror Guild Award	Long Fiction	Won	
59 Frankenstein	1996 International Horror Guild Award	Long Form	Nominated	
Wildest Dreams	1998 International Horror Guild Award	Novel	Nominated	
Blackbirds	1998 International Horror Guild Award	Short Fiction	Nominated	
Blood Money	2001 International Horror Guild Award	Short Fiction	Nominated	
The Mummy's Heart	2014 Locus Award	Novella	Nominated	
Special Collections	2015 Bram Stoker Award	Long Fiction	Nominated	

== Selected bibliography ==
=== Novels ===
- Slippin' Into Darkness (Cemetery Dance Publications, 1994) ISBN 1-881475-07-7

Paperback reprinted by Kensington Books in 1996. ISBN 1-57566-004-0

- Wildest Dreams (Subterranean Press, 1998) ISBN 1-892284-00-6
- The Crow: Wicked Prayer (Harper, 2000) ISBN 0-06-107349-0
- Dark Harvest (Cemetery Dance Publications, 2006) ISBN 1-58767-147-6

Paperback reprinted by Tor Books in 2007. ISBN 0-7653-1911-X

=== Jack Baddalach Mystery series ===
- Saguaro Riptide (1997)
- The Ten-Ounce Siesta (1998). Berkeley Publishing Group. pp. 254. ISBN 978-0425161432

=== Collections ===
- Mr. Fox & Other Feral Tales (Roadkill Press, 1992) (cover art by Alan M. Clark)

Introduction by Edward Bryant
"Mr. Fox"
"The Baddest Son of a Bitch in the House"
"Black Leather Kites"
"Save the Last Dance for Me"
"Sandprint"
"Vessels"
"In Beauty, Like the Night: A Tale of the Living Dead"

This book was re-released in a revised version in 2005 by Subterranean Press with 11 more short stories and authorial commentary about each story (ISBN 1-59606-032-8). Early pre-orders also came with the chapbook Dead Men Tell No Tales. The additional stories are:

"The Body Bags"
"Cosmos"
"Stackalee"
"Tooth & Nail"
"The Entourage"
"Kiss of Death"
"Treats"
"Velvet Fangs"
"!Cuidado!"
"When the Fruit Comes Ripe"
"Walkers"
"The Season of Giving"

The re-released Subterranean Press version also came in a 26 copy lettered edition which featured additional material:

"The Oldest Story in the Book"
"At the Battlements of Bannockburn"
"Ten Fingers of Death"
"Style of the Mantis"
"Man, I Just Work Here"
"Wind-Chimes"
"Cutting to the Chase"
"Satan's Army"
"My Favorite Rejection Slip"

- Bad Intentions (Subterranean Press, 1996) ISBN 0-9649890-0-X

Introduction by Joe R. Lansdale
"Johnny Halloween"
"Eighty-Eight Sins"
"The Cut Man"
"Dead Celebs"
"'59 Frankenstein"
"Candy Bars for Elvis"
"Styx"
"Wrong Side of the Road"
"Gorilla Gunslinger"
"Dead Man's Hand"
"Apotropaics"
She's My Witch"
"Bad Intentions"
"Guignoir"
Story Notes

- The Man with the Barbed-Wire Fists (Night Shade Books, 2001) ISBN 1-892389-11-8

"Seeing Past the Corners"
"Red Right Hand"
"Coyotes"
"Do Not Hasten to Bid Me Adieu"
"The Man with the Barbed-Wire Fists"
"The Pack"
"Blood Money"
"Last Kiss"
"Blackbirds"
"Wrong Turn"
"Spyder"
"In Beauty, Like the Night"
"Minutes"
"Where the Woodbine Twineth"
"Mr. Fox"
"The Hollow Man"
"Return of the Shroud"
"Tombstone Moon"
"The Mojave Two-Step"
"¡Cuidado!"
"Carne Muerta"
"Bucket of Blood"
"Undead Origami"
"Harvest"
"The Bars on Satan's Jailhouse"
Bibliography

- Lesser Demons (Subterranean Press, 2010) ISBN 978-1-59606-294-8

Available as a trade edition and a 250 copy signed limited edition (with a bonus chapbook short story)

"Second Chance"
"The Big Man"
"Lesser Demons"
"Carrion"
"The Fourth Stair up from the Second Landing"
"And What Did You See in the World?"
"Road Dogs"
"The House Inside"
"Durston"
"The Iron Dead"
A Few Words After

- Johnny Halloween: Tales of the Dark Season (Cemetery Dance Publications, 2010)

"Introduction: Dark Seasons Past" by Norman Partridge
"Johnny Halloween"
"Satan's Army"
"The Man Who Killed Halloween" (essay by Norman Partridge)
"Black Leather Kites"
"Treats"
"Three Doors"
"The Jack o' Lantern: A Dark Harvest Tale"

=== Uncollected Short Stories ===
- Afterbirth of a Nation (1992) (with Brian Hodge & Wayne Allen Sallee)
- Those Kids Again (1993) (with Wayne Allen Sallee)
- How Naethen Learned to See (1995) (with Wayne Allen Sallee)
- An Eye for an Eye (1996)
- Castle of the Honda Monsters (2001)
- Red Rover, Red Rover (2001)
- Vampire Lake (2011)
- The Mummy's Heart (2013)
- 10/31: Bloody Mary (2013)
- Incarnadine (2013)
- Fever Springs (2014)
- Special Collections (2015)
- Backbite (2016)
- The Island (2022)
- An Ill Wind Knows Your Name (2024)

=== Chapbooks ===
- "Spyder" (1995)
- "The Bars on Satan's Jailhouse" (1995)
- "Red Right Hand" (1998)
- "The House Inside" (2003)
- "Styx" (2003)

=== Anthologies ===
As editor:

- It Came From The Drive-In (1996) - includes Norman Partridge's short story "’59 Frankenstein" (with Martin H. Greenberg)
