= Michael Gilio =

Writer, Director and Actor

- Born: Illinois, U.S.
- Occupations: Writer, director, actor
- Known for: Kwik Stop; Dungeons & Dragons: Honor Among Thieves

Michael Gilio is an American writer, director, and actor. He is known for the independent film Kwik Stop (2001), Dungeons & Dragons: Honor Among Thieves (2023), and Dark Harvest (2023).

== Life and career ==
Gilio was born in Illinois where he wrote and directed his first feature film, Kwik Stop. The film debuted at the Los Angeles Independent Film Festival in 2001. Gilio was subsequently nominated for an Independent Spirit Award as "Someone to Watch" for Kwik Stop and won "Best Director" at the Buenos Aires International Festival of Independent Cinema. His original screenplay Big Hole was listed as one of the top five scripts on The Black List in 2008 and his script Keep Coming Back was listed again in 2010. As a screenwriter, Gilio has been attached to various studio projects with established directors; Guillermo del Toro and Doug Liman with Justice League Dark; Phil Lord & Christopher Miller with Carter Beats the Devil; Gore Verbinski, Chris Milk and David Fincher with Gilio's original screenplay Bitterroot.

In 2021 two projects written by Gilio were put into production: Dungeons & Dragons: Honor Among Thieves for Paramount Pictures, directed by Jonathan Goldstein & John Francis Daley; and Dark Harvest for MGM, directed by David Slade and executive-produced by Gilio.

== Filmography ==
- Kwik Stop (2001)
- Dungeons & Dragons: Honor Among Thieves (2023)
- Dark Harvest (2023)
- Monkey's Magic Merry Go Round (2026)
