= E'myri Crutchfield =

American actress

- Born: New Orleans, Louisiana
- Education: Ursuline Academy
- Occupation: Actress
- Years active: 2015–present
- Television: Fargo

E'myri Crutchfield is an American film and television actress, and former child actress.

== Early life ==
She was born and raised in New Orleans. She took part in track and field at school but was enrolled in acting classes by her parents due to her ability to do impressions. She began her acting career when she was 12 years old. Crutchfield graduated from Ursuline Academy in 2018.

== Career ==
Her early roles included 2015 film Vacation and 2015 Amazon Prime Video comedy The Kicks. She also appeared in the Phillip Youmans film Burning Cane and crime drama True Detective. In 2017, she was nominated for Outstanding Performance by a Youth at the 48th NAACP Image Awards for her role as Kizzy Kinte in 2016 History Channel miniseries Roots.

In 2020, she had a lead role portraying Ethelrida Pearl Smutny, a precocious teenager and the series narrator, in the fourth series of American anthology show Fargo in which she appeared alongside Timothy Olyphant and Jessie Buckley. That year, she could also be seen in Apple TV+ series Amazing Stories.

She had a lead role in 2023 horror film Dark Harvest. In 2025, she has a recurring role as track athlete Tammy in Netflix adaptation of the Judy Blume novel Forever.

== Filmography ==
Key
†	Denotes films that have not yet been released

Year	Title	Role	Notes
2015	Vacation	Sheila	Feature film
2015–2016	The Kicks	Zoe Knox	10 episodes
2016	Roots	Teen Kizzy	1 episode
2019	True Detective	Regina's niece	1 episode
2019	Burning Cane	Sherry Bland	Film
2020	Amazing Stories	Sterling Johnson	1 episode
2020	Fargo	Ethelrida Pearl Smutny	Lead role; 10 episodes (Season four)
2021	Tell Me Your Secrets	Jess Cairns	3 episodes
2023	Dark Harvest	Kelly	Lead role
2025	Forever	Tammy	
2025	One Spoon of Chocolate		
2025	Just Breathe	Mel	
