= Alexander Hall of the Winter Palace =

Hall in the Southeastern part of Winter Palace in St Petersburg

The Alexander Hall, the Winter Palace, St Petersburg, by Eduard Hau (1861).

The Alexander Hall of the Winter Palace, St Petersburg, was created following the fire of 1837 by Alexander Briullov. The room commemorates the reign of Emperor Alexander I and the Napoleonic Wars.

Decorated in an unusual Gothicised version of classicism, the walls contain twenty-four medallions commemorating Russia's victory over the French, created by the sculptor Count Fyodor Tolstoy.

== Ideological programme and architectural design ==
The project was created by the architect Briullov in 1838 during the rebuilding of the palace's front interiors after the devastating fire of 1837 and was conceived as a memorial to Russia's victory in the Patriotic War of 1812. In contrast to the Military Gallery of the Winter Palace, the idea of perpetuating the memory of the war against Napoleon was resolved here in a figurative and allegorical form of artistic stylisation. The architecture of the room combines elements of Western European Gothic, Empire style and Russian national symbols in an unusual way. The seven pairs of wall supports are decorated in the form of bunches of Gothic columns. The appearance of this technique is usually explained by a constructive necessity - the support of the fan vaults - but it may also be linked with the existence of a hidden ideological programme to decorate the hall, the mysteries of fate and the secret sympathies of Emperor Alexander I. The combination of French Empire ornamentation with Russian double-headed eagles and motifs of Old Russian arms also has a triumphal meaning.

The sculptural decoration of the hall was carried out by D. Agi. The lunette of the end wall contained a medallion bearing the profile of Alexander I in the form of the ancient Slavonic deity Rodomysl, the hall is decorated with enlarged medallions by Fyodor Tolstoy, alternating with figures of Glory. In the northern end of the room, in the spring of 1839, instead of the window already made, a large, full-length portrait of the Emperor was proposed in the place of a massive gilded stretcher reaching to the floor, while the backspace was hung with crimson brocade drapery with two double-headed eagles embroidered on it. The framing has not survived.
