= Ackley Bridge series 2 =

Ackley Bridge
- Series 2
- DVD cover
- No. of episodes: 12

Release
- Original network: Channel 4
- Original release: 5 June – 21 August 2018

Series chronology
- ← Previous; Series 1 Next → Series 3

The second series of the British television drama series Ackley Bridge began broadcasting on 5 June 2018 June 2018 on Channel 4, and ended on 21 August 2018. The series follows the lives of the staff and pupils at the fictional multi-cultural academy school Ackley Bridge College, in the fictitious Yorkshire mill town of Ackley Bridge. It consists of twelve sixty-minute episodes.

== Production and casting ==
Production and filming on the series began in January 2018 in Halifax, West Yorkshire. Filming also occurred in Bradford, West Yorkshire. In January 2018, the show's production company, The Forge, put out an open casting call for teenagers and adults to act as extras in the series.

Former Girls Aloud singer Kimberley Walsh was cast as Steve Bell's (Paul Nicholls) ex-girlfriend, Claire Butterworth, who is the mother to their child, Zac. Walsh said she enjoyed working with Jo Joyner and Nicholls, calling her role "fun" and the show "fantastic [...] with a brilliant cast." Walsh stated that her role in the series is "quite different" to other roles she has portrayed, describing Claire as "sassy and strong" as she is determined "to get her claws back into Steve." Vicky Entwistle, who played Janice Battersby on Coronation Street, appears as Iqbal Paracha's (Narinda Samra) secret wife Sandra Turner and mother of Iqbal's children. Entwistle commented that she was "thrilled to be joining the very talented cast of Ackley Bridge and look forward to watching how everything unfolds" and she "had a great time filming with a wonderful bunch of people." Lin Blakley and Ted Robbins join the show as Mandy's parents, "abusive" Ray, who is suffering from dementia, and Dianne, who "can't cope" with Ray.

== Cast ==
=== Main ===
- Amy-Leigh Hickman as Nasreen Paracha
- Poppy Lee Friar as Missy Booth
- Jo Joyner as Mandy Carter
- Sunetra Sarker as Kaneez Paracha
- Nazmeen Kauser as Razia Paracha
- Cody Ryan as Hayley Booth
- Yaseen Khan as Saleem Paracha
- Sam Bottomley as Jordan Wilson
- Paul Nicholls as Steve Bell
- Adil Ray as Sadiq Nawaz
- Liz White as Emma Keane
- Tom Varey as Will Simpson
- Maariah Hussain as Alya Nawaz
- Arsher Ali as Samir Qureshi
- Lorraine Cheshire as Lorraine Bird
- Sam Retford as Cory Wilson
- Nohail Mohammed as Riz Nawaz
- Fern Deacon as Chloe Voyle
- Samantha Power as Simone Booth
- Emily Pyzer as Candice Murgatroyd
- Gurjeet Singh as Naveed Haider
- Tony Jayawardena as Rashid Hyatt
- Adam Fielding as Aaron Turner
- Jay Saighal as Javid Shah
- Megan Parkinson as Sam Murgatroyd

=== Recurring ===
- Zain Khan as Zain Younis
- Hassan Mahmood as Amin Abad
- India Parsan as Tahira Abad
- Alisha Zaman as Amira Gill
- Kainat Butt as Shireen Siddiqui
- Abdullah Shahid as Mo Akhtar
- Arbaz Rashid as Waqar Abdul-Rehman
- Chloe Lumb as Shannon Burns
- Amina Arslan as Amina Mir
- Nathan Green as Neil Sykes
- Matthew Priestley as Jake Earnshaw
- Harry Myers as Dan Fairfax
- Steve Jackson as Kevin Wilson
- Narinder Samra as Iqbal Paracha
- Razia Yousaf as Granny Paracha
- Kammy Darweish as Mujahid Haider
- Perveen Hussain as Sadia Haider
- Safiyah Mardiyah as Aneesa Sahota
- Anu Hasan as Farida Nawaz
- Meryl Fernandes as Maryam Qureshi
- James Foster as Craig Brimble
- Vicky Entwistle as Sandra Turner
- Halima Ali as Amy Turner
- Kimberley Walsh as Claire Butterworth
- James Senneck as Clint Northwood

=== Guest ===
- Amina Arslan as Amina Mir
- Jonas Khan as Khadim Afzal
- Kelli Hollis as Linda Loan Shark
- Alec Hewes, James Browne and Jonathan Enser as Jazz Band
- Kriss Dosanjh as Moeen Qureshi
- Beth Hunter as Megan Redhead
- Julia Nelson as Brenda Webster
- Alex Dobson as Mel Normal
- Keicha Greenidge as Shalika Phillips
- Amita Suman as Sameera
- Lloyd Lai as Martin Rose
- Christine Brennan as Dr Olivia Allen
- Tigga Goulding as Wendy Jefferson
- Steve Money as Grandpa Murgatroyd
- Ted Robbins as Ray Carter
- Lin Blakley as Dianne Carter
- Zoe Iqbal as Zahra Malik
- James Midgley as Darren Haddock
- Madison Brown as Ashley Currier
- Maya Saroya as Meesha Peerzada
- Anthony Lewis as Tony Potts
- Huni Jalaf as Imam Fazal Hameed
- Stuart Manning as Nik Voyle
- Tahreen Iqbal as Mrs Younis
- Andonis Anthony as Simon Zindillis
- Judy Flynn as Barbara Hammer
- Alexis Platt as Danny Critchall
- Melanie Ash as Sarah Mather
- Rick Carr as Ian Orem
- Dee Hamilton as Sonographer
- Menyee Lai as Irene Girvan

== Episodes ==
| No. overall | No. in series | Title | Directed by | Written by | Original release date | UK viewers (millions) |
|---|---|---|---|---|---|---|
| 7 | 1 | "Episode 1" | Penny Woolcock | Matt Evans | 5 June 2018 | 1.92 |
Nasreen and Missy, dressed in burqas, purchase cider from the off-licence, running away from the owner, and take a large bundle of drug money from Jordan. The staff attend Samir and Maryam's wedding reception at school, but he and Emma are seen kissing by Missy and Nasreen. The next morning, Emma wakes up next to Will, and Missy and Nasreen realize what they did. Kaneez talks to Nasreen about her and Naveed, Nasreen's fiancé, and how to behave at school. Jordan is hassled about the money by a drug dealer, who is warned off by Emma. Nasreen and Naveed kiss in front of everyone; Nasreen tells Missy she wants an easy life when Missy questions her feelings about the arranged marriage. Kaneez knocks down the new biology teacher Rashid while learning to drive, whilst Year 11 take their mock exam and Nasreen and Alya are sent to isolation for fighting when Alya taunts Nasreen with rumours that she and Naveed are having sex. After Missy walks out of her exam when the words she sees are jumbled up, she and Nasreen run away from a café when they think the drug dealer's associate is watching them with the money, but the boy, Aaron, catches up with them, explaining that Iqbal is living in Bradford with another family and he is her half-brother. Mandy decides to pull out low achievers from non-core subjects, which infuriates Emma and her Year 11 students. Missy accompanies Nasreen to Bradford to confront Iqbal, and Chloe lends Jordan money to repay the drug dealer. Emma's Year 11 students confront the staff, choosing to stage a protest, but they give up when they realize their future college courses only require core subject qualifications. Nasreen locates Iqbal with his wife Sandra Turner, daughter Amy, and Aaron, discovering that their relationship has been going on since before her birth. Nasreen meets Naveed's family and when Iqbal returns, Nasreen tells Kaneez about his secret family, but after realizing Kaneez already knew, Nasreen calls off the engagement. Emma and Samir kiss and Kaneez explains to Nasreen that she knew of Iqbal's marriage shortly after she married Iqbal, and Nasreen persuades Kaneez to let her have a girlfriend. Missy and Nasreen throw the drug money off the roof in burqas and when Jordan gives some money to the drug dealer, he orders £40 a day until the money is paid off.
| 8 | 2 | "Episode 2" | Penny Woolcock | Perrie Balthazar | 12 June 2018 | 1.66 |
Jordan gives Cory an invite from Candice to Jamie's christening, while Mandy forces students to remove makeup and smarten up at the school entrance as Steve and Will break up Jordan and Cory fighting. Nasreen rejects Aaron when he turns up and during Science, Hayley gets eyebrow pencil on her face when she tries to reapply her makeup as Jordan offers for his family to pay half of Jamie's christening to Candice. Simone receives a visit from a loan shark, Linda, demanding money to repay the debt of Simone's ex-boyfriend Craig and Kevin refuses to contribute to Jamie's christening. Jordan is threatened by Candice's brothers for the money towards the christening when he cannot pay their half, so Cory and Jordan steal Alpacas and attempt to sell them to a butcher. Razia struggles with the revelation of Iqbal having two families, which has an impact on her homework and Missy has to work on a burger van to repay Simone's ex-boyfriend's debt; when Emma finds out, she suggests to Mandy that they organize a school play for the students to change their opinion of Mandy due to her actions. Kevin is called into school when they find out about the Alpacas and he is updated on Jordan's progress, which infuriates Kevin, especially when he fails to secure a job, and a row between Kevin and Jordan results in Kevin beating up Jordan. Missy decides to return to school when Mandy tells her about the play. Rashid informs Kaneez of Razia's struggles and Claire, the mother of Steve's son Zac, turns up at school with him. Missy is unimpressed when Simone reconciles with her ex-boyfriend and Steve finds out about Jordan's beating from Cory when Jordan attacks Will after PE; Cory and Jordan choose to report Kevin. Mandy and Steve start to reconcile and Rashid puts forward to Kaneez the suggestion that Razia has dyspraxia, unintentionally angering Kaneez, and Jordan backs out of reporting Kevin. Missy and Aaron kiss when Aaron gifts Missy a portaloo for her job and the Parachas talk about how they are coping with Iqbal's other family.
| 9 | 3 | "Episode 3" | Joe Stephenson | Ayub Khan-Din | 19 June 2018 | 1.62 |
Rashid brings a drum kit to the Parachas and explains to Kaneez it can help Razia's coordination whilst Hayley is unhappy with Aaron's presence at her home, who is now Missy's boyfriend. At school, Chloe is comforted by Will when she is upset about being dumped by Jordan, which Alya witnesses and Rashid invites Kaneez to a concert. Alya believes the Muslim students should not participate in the school play due to it not being relevant to their culture and when Emma tries to justify the chosen play, Alya tells Emma about Chloe and Will. Nasreen argues with Missy about her relationship with Aaron and Kaneez is hurt that Emma implies that she does not need a boyfriend. Kaneez rejects Aaron when Missy attempts to introduce him to her, so Kaneez goes to see Sandra, wanting Aaron away and does not want Iqbal anymore, choosing to put herself first. Kaneez has her hair restyled and Aaron tells Kaneez he is in Ackley Bridge for Missy, accepting that his siblings do not want him, but Hayley insists he goes, and at the concert, Rashid is the one performing. Later at Rashid's, he and Kaneez kiss when he opens up about his feelings towards her and they sleep together. Emma confronts Will, demanding to know about him and Chloe, but Will explains Chloe was dumped by Jordan, so he helped Chloe because he loves Emma. Hayley overhears Simone and Aaron talking about Hayley's bond with Missy, so he opts to end things with Missy. Hayley and Razia go to see Aaron and Hayley gives Aaron her blessing for him to be in a relationship with Missy. Emma and Samir have sex, but Samir is unsure of whether to leave his wife. Nasreen and Kaneez also approve of Missy's relationship and Kaneez decides that she needs time before embarking on a relationship with Rashid. The cast is chosen for the play.
| 10 | 4 | "Episode 4" | Joe Stephenson | Richard Davidson | 26 June 2018 | 1.51 |
Samir, wanting to start a relationship with Emma, punches drug dealer Khadim, his former friend when he sees him with Jordan, which is filmed and circulated around the school. Samir is called to see Mandy, where he is reminded of the safeguarding procedure for intervening during out-of-school hours and Sadiq is unhappy with Jordan's behaviour, which is not changing despite efforts. Samir returns home to find Khadim there and Samir warns him not to punish Jordan over the video to save his reputation. Samir introduces boxing to Jordan, and Alya and Sadiq are unimpressed that Will is teaching Science to the 6th form because Rashid is focusing on the Year 11s. Nasreen and Missy join a football team, where Nasreen is asked out by a player, Megan, and when Jordan decides to give up boxing, Samir tells him he has been awarded a government bursary to maintain boxing. The Nawaz family visits Mandy about Rashid not teaching Year 12, but Mandy refuses to back down as Year 11 takes priority, and Nasreen is asked out by Megan. Jordan fights with Mo when he is teased about boxing and Emma finds out about the bursary, which is Samir's money; when Jordan finds out, he returns to drug dealing. Nasreen escapes from her date when Megan invites Nasreen to her place and she is surprised by Aaron's accepting reaction to her being lesbian. Sadiq reluctantly agrees to help Samir warn Khadim away. Samir delights Emma by deciding to admit to his affair, and Mandy is against Sadiq's plans to introduce another deputy headteacher. Emma gains Chloe's approval for her to be in a relationship with Samir, but Samir dies when he is stabbed by Khadim, devastating Emma when Mandy breaks the news, and Jordan returns to boxing.
| 11 | 5 | "Episode 5" | Tina Gharavi and Joe Stephenson | Ishy Din | 4 July 2018 | 1.45 |
Nasreen checks out profiles on a dating app. Steve asks Mandy if he can invite a scout from Halifax rugby club to see Cory play, so Mandy agrees as long as he considers applying for the deputy headship. Nasreen chats with a 21-year-old woman, Sameera, on the dating app and Jordan is caught using the school showers after school by Steve, but he lets him off. Nasreen arranges a date with the woman as Kaneez rips down posters from the school with the woman pictured as she is behind the profile, whilst Year 12 discusses Samir's death. The Year 11 girls crush on Riz, and Kaneez continues to talk to Nasreen on the app. Missy comforts Emma when she admits she and Nasreen saw her and Samir kiss at the wedding. Missy finds out about Kaneez pretending to be Sameera from Emma's posters, so Missy urges her to delete the profile, and Cory tells Mandy that Jordan has been kicked out by their dad, so Mandy lets them know she has to inform child services. Prior to the rugby match, Naveed kisses a shocked Cory and during the match, the scout shows more interest in Riz, so Steve encourages Cory to do his best. When the match continues, Steve berates Kevin for chucking Jordan out and Riz is injured by Cory during a tackle, resulting in him being taken to hospital. Nasreen finds out that Kaneez is Sameera and that Missy knew when she sends a nude selfie. Jordan is given a place at a hostel by child services, whilst Steve decides he does not want to apply for the deputy headship. Mandy and Steve decide to let Jordan live with them, but find he has run away from the hostel. Riz is diagnosed with an unstable neck fracture that requires the use of a neck brace, and Missy is hurt when Nasreen meets up with Naveed. Kaneez apologizes to Nasreen, but Nasreen warns Kaneez not to interfere as Kaneez warns Nasreen about sending nudes. Note: Broadcast on Wednesday instead of Tuesday due to Colombia v England live coverage of the 2018 FIFA World Cup on ITV.
| 12 | 6 | "Episode 6" | Joe Stephenson | Matt Evans | 10 July 2018 | 1.36 |
Simone goes for a job interview and when she is offered a job, she is recognized as a shoplifter. At a memorial for Samir, the tree planting is delayed when it is stolen and Hayley visits Riz when he leaves the hospital. Hayley is teased about her and Riz's relationship in Science, so Missy confronts and fights with Alya about Hayley and Riz, believing it is untrue until Hayley says it is. Samir's tree is found after being set on fire and Emma is angry as she feels Khadim is getting away with killing Samir, so she conducts a door-to-door enquiry but gets no answers and is warned away by Moeen. Missy takes Hayley to Mandy's office, alleging that Riz sexually assaulted Hayley, so Simone, Sadiq and Farida are called into school about the allegation; Mandy explains that it is unlikely Riz will be prosecuted due to Hayley consenting but decides to keep them apart. Missy is annoyed when she believes Simone and Aaron are taking the side of the Nawaz family, so Missy breaks up with Aaron. The male students are reprimanded by Rashid for their online degrading behaviour toward the female students and Mandy takes on Emma's role in the production and Sadiq encourages Emma to return to work for Samir. Cory accepts Naveed for being gay. Simone pushes Missy into putting herself first, so she and Aaron rekindle their relationship and Samir's memorial occurs. After the school play, Missy proposes to Aaron and he accepts.
| 13 | 7 | "Episode 7" | Robert Quinn | Natalie Mitchell and Faryal Velmi | 17 July 2018 | 1.66 |
Leaflets are handed outside the school for a rally against Muslims. After Razia's trainers are stolen from the Mosque, Nasreen confronts the girl, Sam, at school and they fight, but Sam apologizes. Sam is pinned down in the girls' toilets, but she is rescued by Candice and Sam declares in the canteen that she is a lesbian when 'Dyke' is written on her forehead; in the toilets, Sam kisses Nasreen. Missy and Aaron discover an engagement party is being organized and Sadiq meets with Mandy, informing her that Steve has been suspended pending investigation over Riz's injury after a meeting with the governors and Steve is hurt that Mandy seemingly will not defend him. When Emma sets up an LGBT support group and Nasreen turns up, Sam gives Nasreen her number. At Missy's engagement party, Nasreen messages and then meets up with Sam, where they dance and kiss. Missy is upset when she discovers Simone has relapsed and disappeared. In town, some of the students witness the rally and Nasreen is upset when she sees Sam protesting with her family, so Nasreen eggs her. Simone is tracked down by Missy, Hayley, Nasreen and Aaron, but Missy disowns her and Steve confides in Claire about his suspension, but when she makes a move, Steve turns her down and Mandy sees Claire leaving her house. Mandy and Steve argue, which results in Steve opting to walk out. Sam justifies to Nasreen her reasons for joining the protest, which infuriates Nasreen and when Hayley fears she will be taken into care again, Missy reassures her it will not happen as Aaron is moving in. Year 11 refuse to associate with Candice and Sam and the news that Sam slept with Nasreen, though she is kept unnamed, is spread around the school during his suspension, Steve decides to move in with his brother, but Mandy later finds out she is pregnant.
| 14 | 8 | "Episode 8" | Robert Quinn | Lisa Holdsworth | 24 July 2018 | 1.56 |
Mandy announces to Year 11 and the staff that the school day for Year 11 will now end at 4 pm and has cancelled the prom. Mandy finds her father, Ray, in one of the toilet cubicles and when she returns Ray to her mother Dianne, Mandy is informed that Ray's dementia is worsening and Mandy reluctantly takes Ray with her to give Dianne a break. Razia uses skin bleach and when Hayley attempts to fix their friendship, Razia says she used the skin bleach as she believes Riz did not want a brown girlfriend. Ray sets off Mandy's fire alarm and when she returns home, Ray lashes out at Mandy. Emma visits Mandy and works out that she is pregnant and Emma comforts Mandy by giving her a hug. Emma and Will go to a comedy night together where Naveed is performing and Hayley attends school with a dark face for Razia's sake, which attracts support and criticism. Missy coaches Aaron on what to say to Javid about Hayley, but Javid informs Hayley, Missy and Aaron that he will be contacting social services and Mandy and Dianne contemplate putting Ray in a home. Mandy visits a snooker hall and on the CCTV, she witnesses footage of Ray and Jordan; Mandy finds Jordan, who has been working as home help and Javid annoys Mandy by working out a new approach for Year 11. Cory is at the comedy night watching Naveed perform and shows him some support. Naveed's father is unimpressed to see Naveed at the comedy night when Will invites him and Mandy and Dianne successfully prove that Ray has been faking his dementia. Mandy and Emma are against Javid's plans to focus on high achievers and Mandy and Cory locate Jordan, Mandy and Cory inform him that they managed to get Jordan an emergency foster care placement for him and they both convince him to come with them in Mandy’s car. Mandy is upset that Dianne conned her when she sides with Ray and Aaron turns up for the meeting with social services with Emma for support; the outcome is positive. Mandy breaks the news to Steve that she is pregnant but does not want reconciliation and she puts the prom back on.
| 15 | 9 | "Episode 9" | Penny Woolcock | Maya Sondhi | 31 July 2018 | 1.57 |
Whilst donating to the food bank, Alya photographs Cory collecting some food. Cory spends the night with an older woman and Riz returns to school. Alya shares the image of Cory at the food bank online and in PE, Razia and Sam clash. Alya is berated by Cory when he finds out about the image Alya took and being shared, especially after the school won a public speaking debate on charity, which Alya was part of. A fight is arranged between Razia and Sam and Razia takes a scalpel and Alya is isolated by the other students, so she returns home, asking Sadiq to go to a private school. Razia and Sam meet up after school, but Sam is reluctant to fight and Razia accidentally stabs Nasreen with the scalpel. Cory goes shoplifting, but changes his mind when he notices a woman, who he takes home, but is caught by her daughter taking food from their kitchen, and Nasreen struggles to forgive Razia. Alya refuses to comply with Mandy's decision to be in isolation for a week over the image of Cory and Alya insults the staff and students in the canteen. Cory is kicked by the daughter who caught him. Sadiq visits Mandy to inform her that he has lost the factory, but still wants to be a sponsor and the Paracha and Murgatroyd families meet up at school, where Mandy decides to send Sam to a PRU, so her grandfather hurls racist remarks at the Parachas and when Nasreen tells Mandy that Razia stabbed her, Razia has to go to a PRU. Razia finds out Nasreen is a lesbian when she admits Sam is her girlfriend and Cory is accused of theft by Alya, but Sadiq reveals to his family that they are in debt and possessions are taken from their home, so the Nawaz family has to move into a terraced house with family. Kevin climbs onto the roof of the Wilsons' home when he and Cory argue, but he falls off after Cory talks him down and is sectioned. Cory wants Jordan to return home and Javid thinks the school would be better off run by a multi-academy trust, so meets with a CEO at another school, but Mandy convinces the governors to keep Sadiq as the sponsor.
| 16 | 10 | "Episode 10" | Penny Woolcock | Ayub Khan Din | 7 August 2018 | 1.59 |
Naveed struggles with his comedy act, so Cory suggests he does not hold back. Sadia is called into school about Naveed's progress and she witnesses Nasreen and Sam kiss; she tells Naveed. Sadia is disgusted when she works out he is gay. When Rashid assumes Kaneez does not want a relationship, he invites Emma to his University reunion. Rashid pretends Emma is his girlfriend at his reunion and Naveed gets drunk at Hayley's 16th birthday party; he tearfully confides in Cory about his family's reaction. Kaneez arrives at the reunion but is left hurt when she sees Rashid hug a former student and Naveed goes back to Cory's. As Emma and Will get intimate and Emma looks for a condom, she finds out that Chloe has a contraceptive implant. Naveed confides in Nasreen that he and Cory have had sex, but does not like Nasreen's negative response about Cory and after interrupting his Science lesson, Rashid wants to know what is preventing Kaneez from a relationship. Emma is furious about Chloe having a relationship with an older man, Tony, and Chloe is equally furious about Emma being in a relationship with Will, who is younger than Emma, so she chooses to leave home with Tony. Naveed's mum arranges for an Imam to talk to Naveed about his sexuality, but Naveed opts to leave home, however, when he goes to Cory, he finds him with a woman and Cory explains to Naveed he is his best friend and is not gay. Prior to her driving test, Rashid tells Kaneez that he wants to know for definite if Kaneez wants a relationship, so after passing her test, Kaneez informs Iqbal she wants a divorce. Naveed performs his comedy act and Sadia, despite not being able to understand his sexuality, asks for no more lies.
| 17 | 11 | "Episode 11" | Robert Quinn | Richard Davidson | 14 August 2018 | 1.64 |
When Missy faints at a careers fayre after stealing some samples, she tells Nasreen she is pregnant and tells Aaron, who is delighted. Chloe refuses to stop seeing Tony and Candice announces Missy's pregnancy to the school; Missy has a meeting with Mandy and Emma about her schooling, but she walks out of Javid's lesson, choosing to quit school. At a roller disco hosted by Tony for Ackley Bridge, Emma insults Tony on the DJ decks and Missy reveals to Nasreen she got pregnant intentionally by not taking the pill. Emma and Mandy try to persuade Missy to return to school with plans in place and Rashid suggests to Mandy, Sadiq and Javid they change the prom format to persuade traditional parents to let their children attend, and Emma contacts Nik, who arrives at the school to suggest the family spend time with Tony at a club. After Aaron gets in a fight, he admits to Nasreen he is not ready to be a dad and Nasreen confesses it was not an accident, but he remains calm. Mandy and Sadiq are against Javid's recommendation that the school sells some of the land and at Emma's party, Nik flirts with Emma and Chloe decides to move in with Tony, but Tony humiliates her by stating their relationship is for fun. Missy comes across her mum when looking at baby essentials and Missy tells Aaron she does not want the baby, which results in Aaron dumping Missy. Will finds a tearful Chloe at school and she and Emma make amends and Missy chooses to return to school after having an abortion. Kaneez allows Rashid to talk about University with Nasreen and Emma kisses Will in the staff room.
| 18 | 12 | "Episode 12" | Robert Quinn | Stephen Russell | 21 August 2018 | 1.25 |
Some of the Year 11 students chase a van, believing it contains their exam papers, but it instead contains pet supplies and Cory tells Jordan that their dad is returning home. It is ruled that Steve was not responsible for Riz's injuries and Mandy meets with two members of an academy trust who want to take over as sponsor at Ackley Bridge, but Mandy declines their offer. Jordan talks to Mandy about applying to an art college, who encourages him and when Jordan meets with his social worker about his living arrangements. Lorraine airs a private conversation over the tannoy between Mandy and Javid over the school's future after he went to a trust. Jordan and Candice track his mum, Sarah, down at a pub. Mandy meets with the staff about the finances, Razia returns to school for her exams and Jordan goes to the pub; he updates Sarah on his life, but she is not interested. Mandy and Steve have their first baby scan, but she breaks down about a trust taking over. Jordan takes his friends to Sarah's pub and he berates Sarah and her partner Ian; Jordan later breaks into the pub and starts a fire. Nasreen and Razia make amends and Mandy discusses the school being run by a trust with Sadiq and Jordan walks out of prom as he feels like a failure. On GCSE results day, Sadiq allows the trust to take over the school, Year 11 get their GCSE results and Steve gets Jordan an interview at the college, which he is accepted to but Cory brands the decision selfish, however, Steve supports him and eventually, Cory does too. Mandy is kept on as headteacher by the Valley Trust and Missy shows off her new sixth-form blazer to Nasreen.
