= Ackley Bridge series 3 =

Ackley Bridge
- Series 3
- DVD cover
- No. of episodes: 8

Release
- Original network: Channel 4
- Original release: 18 June – 6 August 2019

Series chronology
- ← Previous; Series 2 Next → Series 4

The third series of the British television drama series Ackley Bridge began broadcasting on 18 June 2019 on Channel 4, and ended on 6 August 2019. The series follows the lives of the staff and pupils at the fictional multi-cultural academy school Ackley Bridge College, in the fictitious Yorkshire mill town of Ackley Bridge. It consists of eight sixty-minute episodes.

== Production and casting ==
Production and filming on the series began in January 2019 in Halifax, West Yorkshire. In November 2018, Ackley Bridge put out an open casting for boys aged 15 to 18 of Polish ethnicity. In January 2019, the castings of Charlie Hardwick and Rob James-Collier were announced; Hardwick was cast as Sue Carp, director of pupil behaviour, whilst James-Collier was cast as the new deputy headteacher and Emma Keane's (Liz White) replacement as an English teacher, Martin Evershed. Hardwick said she is "absolutely over the moon to be joining" the show, complimenting the "fantastic characters and brilliantly-sharp storytelling." Hardwick describes Sue as "belligerent and unwilling" and who is "solely concerned with counting down the next ten years to her retirement" rather than the welfare of the students. James-Collier said he is "thrilled" of his casting and called the young actors "fearless and talented." Upon completion of filming, Mountview graduates Hareet Deol and Adrian Nik were revealed to have joined the cast; Deol portrays new PE teacher Hassan Hussein, whilst Nik was cast as Yusef Ibrahim. The additions of George Potts, as Mandy's new "nightmare" boss Ken Weaver, and Phoebe Tuffs-Berry, as Year 10 "bad girl" Rukhsana, were announced shortly before the trailer's release. Natalie Gavin was later revealed to be playing Sam's "formidable" mum, fresh out of prison, Nadine Murgatroyd. In the third episode of the series, Ty Glaser was introduced as the stand-in headteacher, Sian Oakes.

== Cast ==
=== Main ===
- Amy-Leigh Hickman as Nasreen Paracha
- Jo Joyner as Mandy Carter
- Sunetra Sarker as Kaneez Paracha
- Nazmeen Kauser as Razia Paracha
- Cody Ryan as Hayley Booth
- Yaseen Khan as Saleem Paracha
- Adil Ray as Sadiq Nawaz
- Maariah Hussain as Alya Nawaz
- Lorraine Cheshire as Lorraine Bird
- Sam Retford as Cory Wilson
- Nohail Mohammed as Riz Nawaz
- Fern Deacon as Chloe Voyle
- Samantha Power as Simone Booth
- Emily Pyzer as Candice Murgatroyd
- Gurjeet Singh as Naveed Haider
- Tony Jayawardena as Rashid Hyatt
- Megan Parkinson as Sam Murgatroyd
- Rob James-Collier as Martin Evershed
- Charlie Hardwick as Sue Carp
- Phoebe Tuffs-Berry as Rukhsana Ibrahim
- Zara Salim as Kacey 'Spud' Gartside
- Szymon Kantor as Pawel Nowicki
- Abdul Ahadbutt as Younis Iqbal
- Hareet Deol as Hassan Hussein
- Ty Glaser as Sian Oakes

==== Featured ====
- Poppy Lee Friar as Missy Booth (Note: Friar is credited as part of the main cast but only appears in 2 episodes.)
- Liz White as Emma Keane (Note: White is credited as part of the main cast but only appears in 1 episode.)

=== Recurring ===
- Zain Khan as Zain Younis
- Hassan Mahmood as Amin Abad
- India Parsan as Tahira Abad
- Abdullah Shahid as Mo Akhtar
- Arbaz Rashid as Waqar Abdul-Rehman
- Chloe Lumb as Shannon Burns
- Amina Arslan as Amina Mir
- Nathan Green as Neil Sykes
- Matthew Priestley as Jake Earnshaw
- Harry Myers as Dan Fairfax
- Steve Jackson as Kevin Wilson
- Razia Yousaf as Granny Paracha
- Anu Hasan as Farida Nawaz
- Kammy Darweish as Mujahid Haider
- Perveen Hussain as Sadia Haider
- Safiyah Hardiyah as Aneesa Sahota
- James Senneck as Clint Northwood
- Steve Money as Grandpa Murgatroyd
- Antonio Aakeel as Anwar Wazir
- Vicky Myers as Debbie Gartside
- George Potts as Ken Weaver
- Natalie Gavin as Nadine Murgatroyd
- Shahid Ahmed as Zaffar Iqbal
- Jessica Kaliisa as Gaynor Evershed
- Freddie Bolt as Reece Murgatroyd
- Nish Nathwani as Zain Younis Senior
- James Atherton as Tim Collins

=== Guest ===
- Declan O'Connor as Pete Day
- Rita May as Julie "Nana" Booth
- James Schofield as Thomas Padgett
- Emily Coates as Lucy Pellow
- Sophie Young as Maris Cooper
- Annie Cowan as Dr Marielle Conway
- Martin Wenner as Dr Harry Brown
- Fahriya Ali as Farah Iqbal
- Parsa Ahmed as Sakina Iqbal
- Jake Hayward as Kyan Murgatroyd
- Sebastian Shaw as Adam Smith
- Ahmad Sakhi as Mani Busra
- Faraz Ayub as Umar Masood
- Jeff Mirza as Akram Hussein
- Moey Hassan as Karim Abad
- Alfie Wilson as Charlie Evershed
- Sukai Morton as Isla Evershed
- Christine Barton-Brown as Janet Crabbe
- Jordan Jessup as Police Officer
- Vanessa Pound as Gemma Hunt
- Bikram Gurmit as Bimilinder Singh
- Luke Bayer as Matthew Barnes
- Buckso Dhillon-Woolley as Tasnim Ibrahim
- Jumana Patel as Hanifa Ibrahim
- Anisha Azam as Safiyah Ibrahim
- Arian Nik as Yusef Ibrahim
- Wass Javed as Adeel Ibrahim
- Hayley Mason as Mrs. Wright
- Kelli Hollis as Loan Shark Linda
- Charlotte Sowerby as Dirty Donna
- Dean Colebourne as PC Sexy Bod
- Steve Garth as Gordon Carp
- Rory Gallagher as Custody Sergeant

== Episodes ==
No. overall	No. in series	Title	Directed by	Written by	Original release date	UK viewers (millions)
19	1	"Oxford Dreams"	Penny Woolcock	Ayub Khan-Din	18 June 2019	1.52
Despite Mandy's best efforts, the Valley Trust takeover has left Ackley Bridge in a state of chaos. Nas and Missy travel to Oxford for Nas's interview at Oxford University. Nas admits she feels inadequate compared to the other Oxford applicants, but Missy persuades her to stay for the interview. Nas does well, but a rift begins to form between the two, as Missy is jealous of Nas leaving Ackley. Meanwhile, new student Rukhsana Ibrahim gets into trouble and new deputy headteacher Martin Evershed clashes with Nadine Murgatroyd, resulting in his car being set on fire. Mandy gives the lazy new staff an angry pep talk, declaring she will not let the Valley Trust change her vision for the school; however, she is impressed with Mr Evershed and wants him to remain deputy head. Kaneez encourages Nas to make up with Missy. Nas tells Missy she wanted things to remain the same while she's at Oxford, but agrees with Missy that they both have to go. On their way home, Missy and Nasreen are knocked over by a car.
20	2	"Consequences"	Penny Woolcock	Richard Davidson	25 June 2019	1.51
In the wake of the car crash, Nas wakes up in hospital. Missy has two broken wrists but seems otherwise fine. However, Missy wakes up the next morning to a vision of Nana Booth. Her family and friends discover she has died due to internal bleeding. Nas is furious at the driver who killed Missy. She asks Sam to help her get revenge. Sam's cousins beat up the driver, who is Asian. This leads to fighting at the school, as many Asian students believe the beating was racially motivated. Meanwhile, Mr Evershed clashes with new PE teacher Mr Hussein, who he accuses of taking the Asian students' side rather than being impartial. However, Mr Hussein takes the criticism on board. He takes the students on a group walk and establishes a girls' rugby team, impressing Mrs Carter. Kaneez is devastated when she discovers Nas arranged for the driver to be beaten. She tells Nas everything is about race. Nas apologises to the driver and also asks Nadine Murgatroyd to try to stop the fighting. Many Ackley students and teachers attend Missy's funeral, including Emma Keane. On the school playground, the students release lanterns in memory of Missy. Mrs Carter congratulates Nas on being accepted into Oxford but Nas says she's decided to leave school.
21	3	"Nothing Else to Say"	Sarmad Masud	Kim Revill	2 July 2019	1.41
Rashid proposes to Kaneez. She initially accepts, but soon admits she does not want to go through with the wedding, leaving Rashid upset. Mandy is in trouble with the Valley Trust after attempting to engage with parents via an article in a far-right local newspaper. Many of the school's Asian pupils are absent. Meanwhile, Nas is working at a tea towel factory. Naveed invites her to his houseparty, but this goes badly. Nas kisses Chloe after Chloe comforts her, and Chloe sleeps with Cory Wilson. Mandy and Kaneez encourage Asian parents to send their kids back to school, but Kaneez is verbally abused for her relationship with Rashid. Later, Rashid shouts at the men who abused Kaneez, but he resigns from Ackley after seeing a video of his angry behaviour. Kaneez is upset at the idea of Rashid leaving. The pair reconcile, promising to never marry. Sadiq helps Mandy to engage with parents through a school cricket match. At the match, Kaneez defends Rashid to the students and parents, and Mandy suggests she apply for student support officer. Sian Oakes is introduced as Mandy's temporary replacement ahead of her maternity leave.
22	4	"The Family Business"	Sarmad Masud	Faryal Velmi	9 July 2019	1.36
Nas and Sam are taken home in a police car after being caught shoplifting. Sam's family celebrate, but Kaneez is furious. Mr Evershed tries to convince Sam to abandon crime and work hard in school, but this angers Nadine. Under Nadine's instruction, Sam and her cousin Reece break into a house and steal valuables. Sam narrowly escapes being caught, and realises the house is Mr Evershed's. Meanwhile, Ruki unintentionally embarrasses Spud after Spud has her period in class. Spud tells Ruki she can't afford period products as her family are struggling. The two begin to form a tentative friendship, with Ruki bringing period products for Spud and going round her house for tea. Sam talks to Nas, trying to justify her loyalty to her family. Nas tells Kaneez she is struggling; Kaneez persuades her to go back to school. Sam learns Nadine was prepared to leave Sam behind during the break-in. She goes to Mr Evershed's house to apologise, and tells the police about the break-in. Kaneez gets the job as student support officer. Sian Oakes offers extra study sessions for Cory after finding he has been working as a waiter and copying Naveed's homework. Sam realises Nadine was jealous of Mr Evershed, and cries as Nadine is arrested.
23	5	"Nowhere to Stay"	Rachna Suri	Adam Usden	16 July 2019	1.19
Cory gets kicked out after being caught sleeping with his dad’s girlfriend. Naveed distances himself from Cory, realising Cory is making him miserable. Sam is kicked out of her house. After Mr Evershed finds that Cory and Sam are homeless, he finds a hostel place for Sam, and Sian offers to take Cory for the night. At her house, he makes a pass at her. Mandy gives birth, but is overwhelmed and asks for Kaneez’s help to get organised. Sue and Sian try to develop Cory’s cooking skills, but Cory cheats by giving them a curry he got from a takeaway. Sian reminds Martin of safeguarding rules after the hostel mentions he was alone in Sam’s room with the door shut. Martin is wounded at this accusation. Nas sets Naveed up with Matthew, a boy from his dance class who is already at drama school. Sian keeps Cory back from detention and kisses him. They have sex in Sian’s car. Sian tells Cory to meet her again tomorrow, but emphasises he cannot tell anyone.
24	6	"They Don't Know Nothing"	Rachna Suri	Natalie Mitchell	23 July 2019	1.22
Candice breaks Dan’s arm after finding out he only slept with her in order to brag about it in a sixth form boys’ group chat. Sian breaks things off with Cory, worried he is involved in this bragging culture. Ruki’s controlling brother Yusef tries to send her away to Leicester as he is sick of her rebellious behaviour. Ruki and Spud get revenge by printing out semi-nude pictures of Yusef and hanging them around town. However, Yusef loses his job and walks out on Ruki and her sisters. Nas organises a night out but is sad when Sam doesn’t turn up. She convinces Sam to sneak out from the hostel and confesses she wants them to get back together. Ruki is struggling on her own and cannot pay rent. She apologises to Yusef and he agrees to come home, but Spud believes Ruki is “boring” when she attempts to behave properly for Yusef’s sake. Sian feels left out from the other teachers and tells Cory that she still has feelings for him. Kaneez convinces Yusef to allow Ruki to play rugby for the school. Riz asks Cory if he has a girlfriend. Cory warns Riz not to tell anyone else, but whispers something in his ear.
25	7	"Rumors"	Jo Johnson	Nicôle Lecky and Kim Revill	30 July 2019	1.18
A rumour is going round the school that Cory is in a relationship with a teacher. Mandy’s school visit goes badly as the students question if Cory is the father of her baby. Under pressure from Sian, Cory tells Mandy he made up the rumours. Ruki helps Spud try to find her father, who Spud believes is of Greek Cypriot heritage. Sian is furious with Cory for telling Riz about them; she breaks things off with Cory for good. Sian attempts to cover her tracks by telling Mandy that Cory obsesses over Sian and that he tried to kiss her. Chloe accidentally outs Nas as lesbian at the school promise raffle. Spud’s mum tells her that Sadiq is her father. Cory confronts Sian’s fiance Tim, but Tim does not listen to Cory and Cory hits him in the face. Mandy finds Cory distraught at Sian’s house; he finally tells her about his relationship with Sian. Mandy interrupts Sian’s hen party to tell her Tim is hurt. Sian admits she was having a relationship with Cory and Mandy says she will support Sian through proceedings with the Trust. However, after Sian is suspended, she claims Cory’s claims are obsessive fantasy and blames Riz and Alia for spreading rumours. Spud and Sadiq bond over bowling, and Nas decides to proudly come out as lesbian at school. Mandy and Martin believe Cory but explain that Cory has to cooperate with the investigation into Sian. Cory remains devastated, believing Sian had loved him.
26	8	"A Bright Rosy Future"	Jordan Hogg	Ayub Khan Din	6 August 2019	1.14
Nas struggles with A-level exams and believes she has completely lost her chance at Oxford. Mandy becomes worried as Cory doesn’t turn up to exams. She asks Mrs Carp to help rebuild Cory’s confidence. Mrs Carp takes the challenge, getting Cory a job as a chef. Naveed has his heart set on drama school in Manchester but his parents cannot afford it. Nas comes up with a solution: Sam, Nas and Naveed will share a flat in Manchester and help Naveed with money. Kaneez comes to Manchester with the gang, seeing the flat and the vibrant LGBT community, but is worried it isn’t what Nas really wants. On results day, Nas misses her offer for Oxford but isn’t surprised. The Year 13s go out to celebrate. Naveed stays behind to talk to Cory, who is angry when Naveed expresses concern for him. However, they reconcile and hug when Cory admits he is upset over being left behind. Kaneez goes to Oxford and persuades them to give Nas a place due to the difficult circumstances she faced in exam year. Nas is frightened of letting Sam and Naveed down, but Kaneez encourages her to go. Naveed’s parents give him their blessing to go to drama school, and Cory decides to retake Year 13. Alia recovers from her initial shock that Spud is her sister, and encourages Sadiq to have a relationship with Spud. Before leaving Ackley Bridge for Oxford, Nas scatters Missy’s ashes. The skip that Nas and Missy used to sit on is finally taken away.
