= Ackley Bridge series 1 =

Ackley Bridge
- Series 1
- DVD cover
- No. of episodes: 6

Release
- Original network: Channel 4
- Original release: 7 June – 12 July 2017

Series chronology
- Next → Series 2

The first series of the British television drama series Ackley Bridge began broadcasting on 7 June 2017 on Channel 4, and ended on 12 July 2017. The series follows the lives of the staff and pupils at the fictional multi-cultural academy school Ackley Bridge College, in the fictitious Yorkshire mill town of Ackley Bridge. It consists of six sixty-minute episodes.

== Production ==
Channel 4 announced the casting for new school drama, The ABC, in early 2017. Production and filming on the series began in February 2017 in Halifax, West Yorkshire with the former St Catherine's Catholic High School used as Ackley Bridge College. The series was later renamed to Ackley Bridge.

== Cast ==
=== Main ===
- Poppy Lee Friar as Missy Booth
- Amy-Leigh Hickman as Nasreen Paracha
- Jo Joyner as Mandy Carter
- Sunetra Sarker as Kaneez Paracha
- Nazmeen Kauser as Razia Paracha
- Cody Ryan as Hayley Booth
- Esa Ashraf as Saleem Paracha
- Sam Bottomley as Jordan Wilson
- Paul Nicholls as Steve Bell
- Adil Ray as Sadiq Nawaz
- Liz White as Emma Keane
- Tom Varey as Will Simpson
- Maariah Hussain as Alya Nawaz
- Arsher Ali as Samir Qureshi
- Lorraine Cheshire as Lorraine Bird
- Sam Retford as Cory Wilson
- Nohail Mohammed as Riz Nawaz
- Fern Deacon as Chloe Voyle
- Anneika Rose as Lila Shariff
- Samantha Power as Simone Booth

=== Recurring ===
- Rita May as Julie 'Nana' Booth
- Zain Khan as Zain Younis
- Hassan Mahmood as Amin Abad
- India Parsan as Tahira Abad
- Alisha Zaman as Amira Gill
- Kainat Butt as Shireen Siddiqui
- Abdullah Shahid as Mo Akhtar
- Arbaz Rashid as Waqar Abdul-Rehman
- Chloe Lumb as Shannon Burns
- Nathan Green as Neil Sykes
- Matthew Priestley as Jake Earnshaw
- Harry Myers as Dan Fairfax
- Steve Jackson as Kevin Wilson
- Emily Pyzer as Candice Murgatroyd
- Narinder Samra as Iqbal Paracha
- Surinda Kaur as Granny Paracha

=== Guest ===
- Chris Abe as Police Officer
- Freddie Bolt as Reece Murgatroyd
- Jamie Dorrington as Jack Murgatroyd
- Sean Croke as Alex Hamilton
- Stuart Manning as Nik Voyle
- Sebastian Shaw as Adam Smith
- Anu Hasan as Farida Nawaz
- Noorul Choudhury as GP
- Wendy Patterson as Funeral Director
- Simon Lowe as Darren Critchall
- Jag Sanghera as Karim
- Kiran Landa as Maryam Qureshi
- Anastasia Ryan as Lady in Hebden Bridge
- Julian Kay as Gary Williams
- Alexandra D'Sa as Sita Kapoor
- Gurjeet Singh as Naveed Haider
- Kate Baines as Solicitor
- Mark Chatterton as Judge
- Michael Forrest as Chair of Governors

== Episodes ==
No. overall	No. in series	Title	Directed by	Written by	Original release date	UK viewers (millions)
1	1	"First Day"	Penny Woolcock	Malcolm Campbell and Anya Reiss	7 June 2017	3.17
Best friends Missy Booth and Nasreen Paracha drink cider together. Students arrive at Ackley Bridge, an academy school formed by the merger of two local schools. Missy is retaking Year 11 and is in the same class as her sister, Hayley Booth. Emma Keane arrives late at a staff meeting and finds out an old friend, Samir Qureshi, works as Community Liaison. Jordan Wilson uses a Muslim name and uses his views on Islam to make up new rules, annoying his Muslim classmates. Headteacher Mandy Carter does not want to give into Jordan and agrees with her husband, Steve Bell, over school sponsor Sadiq Nawaz, placing Jordan on report. Emma's daughter, Chloe Voyle, arrives and throws up over Emma in front of Mandy and Chloe tells Liz she has been thrown out by her father, who is expecting a baby. Missy takes a dislike to Nasreen's Muslim friends, who she thinks are prejudice to her. Emma is annoyed with Chloe when she finds out from Chloe's father, Nik Voyle, that Chloe attacked his girlfriend Eve and in retaliation, Chloe shares a naked photo of Emma online. Missy and Hayley find their mother Simone drunk in their grandmother Julia's house. Nasreen and her sister help Missy and Hayley get Simone out of the house and Nasreen suggests to Missy she tones down her behaviour for Alya. Emma finds out about the photo online from Mandy, figuring out Chloe was responsible. Jordan runs around the school in a hijab and Mandy reprimands Steve when he pulls off an innocent student's hijab by mistake and Steve hints to Mandy he believes she is having an affair with Sadiq. Jordan locks himself in the office and over the tannoy, he airs his views on and insults the school and students. Missy starts a fight with Nasreen over Nasreen not defending Simone. Steve hits Jordan when he fuels Steve's doubts about Mandy having an affair. Nik arrives with Chloe's stuff and tells Emma and Chloe that Chloe cannot live with him. Missy asks Cory to sleep with Nasreen. Guest starring: Nik Voyle
2	2	"Baby Sitting"	Penny Woolcock	Anya Reiss	14 June 2017	2.22
Jordan is chased to school by a group of boys and a girl, Candice, helps him, but leaves her son Jamie with Jordan, revealing he is the father. Nasreen starts wearing a hijab and Missy agrees to sleep with Cory if he sleeps with Nasreen, which spreads around the school. Missy reveals to Nasreen in an argument what her plan was. Jordan asks Steve for help with the baby. Mandy disapproves of Emma placing Alya in isolation due to her being Sadiq's daughter. Jordan and Steve take the baby back to Candice's, but Jordan is beaten up by Candice's brothers and they leave. Jordan finds out that Steve has a child with another woman. Mandy finds out about Jordan being a father and Mandy accompanies Steve with taking Jordan home due to child protection. Steve admits to Mandy he hit Jordan. Julie accuses Simone of stealing money and Missy and Nasreen go to Simone, taking it off Simone's boyfriend and Nasreen reveals she is gay. Nasreen decides to remove her hijab. Mandy has to inform Jordan's father, Kevin Wilson, about his situation, but he doesn't believe Jordan is the dad and insults him. Jordan decides not to tell his dad about Steve hitting him. Nasreen admits to Missy she has been with Lila Sharif, the Biology teacher. Chloe encourages Emma to go for it with Samir. At a governor's reception, Mandy and Sadiq kiss.
3	3	"Teacher Crush"	Robert Quinn	Ishy Din and Suhayla Bushra	21 June 2017	1.98
Nasreen tells Missy about what has happened between her and Lila. Steve suggests to Mandy that Sadiq invests in new strips for the rugby team to unite the Muslim and White students. Steve selects Cory and Riz for the rugby team when they fight, as well as Jordan when Steve agrees to help him with Jamie in exchange. Kaneez returns home to find her husband Iqbal there and Nasreen overhears her parents arguing over arranging a marriage for her in Pakistan. Mandy and Steve go to the Nawaz's and Riz spots Sadiq with Mandy. Nasreen confides in Lila about the marriage and Lila makes sure Nasreen understands nothing can happen between them. Nasreen declines Missy suggestion that she finds a girlfriend due to who she is as well as preventing upsetting her father. Sadiq arranges a match for the rugby team. Alya publicly rejects Cory when he asks her out, but Chloe and Hayley agrees to go out with Cory and Riz. Steve agrees to pay for a DNA test for Jordan. Hayley is unimpressed when Chloe hints that she may have sex with Cory and drinks cider, resulting in them falling out. Nasreen is persuaded for and against the marriage by either of her parents. Emma finds out Samir is engaged and both Mandy and Sadiq agree to end their affair. Nasreen and Missy go to a gay club in Leeds and Nasreen bumps into Lila and they kiss.
4	4	"Missy's Story"	Robert Quinn	Suhayla Bushra	28 June 2017	1.94
Nasreen returns home late at night after going to a gig with Lila and tells Iqbal she does not want to get married. Missy is shocked when she finds Nana Booth dead in the bath, having suffered a heart attack. Steve gives Jordan a DNA test and he asks Mandy for them to help Jordan. Missy breaks the news to Nasreen that Nana Booth is dead and fears Hayley will be taken into care. Nasreen supports Missy when she phones a doctor and Missy lies to the doctor that she lives with her mum. Hayley is devastated when she is told about Nana Booth's death and Hayley agrees to keep it quiet. Hayley is placed in isolation and Missy attempts to make the funeral arrangements. Candice orders Jordan to forget the DNA test, but he manages to get a sample. Missy rejects Simone's offer to help. Rumours spread about Lila's sexuality and Missy asks Emma for £1,000, confiding in her that Nana Booth is dead. Missy persuades Emma to give her and Hayley time to overcome Nana Booth's death and pays for the funeral. Lila tells her class that she is gay and she puts an end to things with Nasreen. Missy attacks Simone when she attempts to take a blanket from Nana Booth's house. Emma and Kaneez ask Mandy not to phone child protection about Missy and Hayley until after the cremation. A social worker, Darren Critchall, arrives at the school and tells Missy and Hayley that they have found a foster family for Hayley in Bradford. Missy and Hayley are both upset at being separated. Mandy confesses to Steve that she had sex with Sadiq. Missy receives Nana Booth's ashes from Emma.
5	5	"Nas's Confession"	Jon East	Ayub Khan-Din	5 July 2017	1.87
Kaneez sees Nasreen and Iqbal go to a wedding outfit shop. Emma goes to Missy's, concerned as she has not been at school. Iqbal tells Kaneez that Nasreen decided to get married and Kaneez chucks Iqbal out. Nasreen tells Kaneez that she wants Iqbal to arrange the marriage. It is Chloe's sixteenth and Chloe is fed up of feeling that Emma prefers Missy over her. Steve injures Sadiq when he tackles him in rugby. Emma climbs into Missy's house through the window and Missy is angry with Emma. Nasreen does not want to get married when Kaneez gives her jewellery and admits she is gay, which Kaneez struggles to accept. Emma allows Chloe to have a party and Missy, after she finds out Nasreen admitted she was gay, tells Kaneez to be there for Nasreen. Steve and Mandy agree to try and move on. Kaneez goes to Hebden Bridge to look for lesbians and prior to their match, the rugby team perform a Bollywood dance. Kaneez meets a woman, who is gay and with a woman, but is married to a gay man, pretending to be straight for her family's benefit. Jordan finds out he is not the father of Jamie, but pretends the opposite to Steve and Kaneez starts to accept Nasreen's sexuality. Kaneez visits Missy and reminisces about how Simone used to be and Alya is told about Sadiq and Mandy's affair by Riz. Missy decides to search for Simone in order to get Hayley back with Emma and Samir, finding Simone taking drugs in the subway. Chloe gives alcohol to her friends at her party before going clubbing and Emma picks up a drunk Chloe. Samir gives Emma advice about her relationship with Chloe. Steve struggles to overcome Mandy's affair and Missy finds Simone at home.
6	6	"Outed"	Jon East	Anya Reiss	12 July 2017	1.78
Mandy briefs the staff on the school's open day. Jordan tells Candice he knows Jamie is not his son and he discovers the possibility of Cory being the father. Missy and Nasreen lead tours of the school. Jordan confronts Cory, demanding to know if he had sex with Candice and Alya exposes Mandy and Sadiq's affair. Chloe is annoyed with Emma being distracted by Missy and Samir and Emma struggles to get Mandy to approve time off to go to Hayley's care hearing. Jordan takes Steve's car and he and Chloe go joyriding and Jordan asks Chloe to runaway with him. Alya berates Sadiq and Chloe kisses Jordan. Simone leaves the house during the night. Emma is informed Chloe and Jordan were found and cannot go to the hearing. Mandy backs out of her governors meeting to support Missy and Hayley. Emma picks Chloe up from the police station and Chloe reveals to Emma her true feelings about their relationship. Jordan tells Steve about Jamie's paternity while Mandy speaks up for Missy and Hayley and Simone turns up at the hearing. Sadiq refuses to the governors suggestion that he leaves and the judge rules Hayley can be returned to Simone.
