= Ackley Bridge series 4 =

Ackley Bridge
- Series 4
- DVD cover
- No. of episodes: 10

Release
- Original network: Channel 4; All 4
- Original release: 19 April 2021

Series chronology
- ← Previous; Series 3 Next → Series 5

The fourth series of the British television drama series Ackley Bridge began broadcasting on Channel 4 on 19 April 2021. The series follows the lives of the staff and pupils at the fictional multi-cultural academy school Ackley Bridge College, in the fictitious Yorkshire mill town of Ackley Bridge. When the commissioning of the series was announced, it was announced that Ackley Bridge would face an overhaul, including cast changes, a shortened runtime and a revised timeslot. The series consists of ten thirty-minute episodes, whereas episodes in the previous three series were double the duration. Unlike the first three series, the timeslot was moved to 6pm to appeal to a younger audience. Following the premiere of the first episode on 19 April, the series was made available to stream as a boxset on All 4.

== Production and casting ==
Unlike the second and third series, the renewal of Ackley Bridge was not announced immediately after the conclusion of the series prior. Four months after the conclusion of series three, it was announced that Ackley Bridge had been renewed and would face an overhaul. One of the changes that was made to the programme in the fourth series was the overhaul of the cast. Robyn Cara was cast as Kayla Azfal, a "funny, mixed-race pupil torn between her white mum's family and her traditional Pakistani dad's family", alongside sister Marina Perry, played by Carla Woodcock, who was described by Digital Spy as a "mean girl". Yasmin Al-Khudhairi was cast as Fizza, the best friend of Kayla, and a "fiercely intelligent, fist-in-the-air firebrand". Ryan Dean was cast in the role of Johnny Cooper, "a cocky, good-looking member of the traveller community who is deeply suspicious of school, and who catches the eye of both Kayla and Fizza", and it was also confirmed that Connor McIntyre would guest star as Johnny's grandfather. Tahir Randhawa, played by Shobhit Piasa, also debuted in the fourth series as "the smooth talking billy-liar nephew of Kaneez, whose salesman's patter hides a family secret". The numerous castings came as a result of numerous cast members leaving following the ending of the third series. Jasmine Payne was also cast as Queenie Cooper, as well as Olivia Marie Fearn as Rose Boswell. Original cast member Sunetra Sarker also took on an associate producer role in the fourth series.

In December 2019, it was announced that filming for the fourth series would commence in March 2020, with the commissioning of the series set for September 2020. However, shortly after filming commenced, it was announced that production had been suspended due to the impact of the COVID-19 pandemic on television. The Halifax Courier reported that there would be a minimum of a two-month break, but confirmed that Ackley Bridge "will be back", amidst rumours of the series' cancellation. Later in the year, it was announced that filming would recommence in September, and that it would air in April 2021. A casting call for experienced extras aged 9 to 19 with an Asian background was advertised. It was added by Northern Talent, the casting company, that they would prefer groups of extras from the same household, since it meant that they could interact on set without quarantining beforehand. It was also confirmed that regular cast members would be tested for the virus and placed into "bubbles" in order for them to physically interact with each other on-screen. Producers decided not to incorporate the pandemic into the storylines.

Another of the changes made to Ackley Bridge in this series was the runtime, which was halved from 60 minutes to 30 minutes. Rebecca Holdsworth, Channel 4's commissioning executive, stated that the shortened runtime was to reflect the viewing habits of younger viewers and to give the series "a new look and feel" with the new characters joining. It was later confirmed that the series would air on Channel 4 in 2021, with the ten episodes being broadcast every weekday across two weeks. Unlike the first three series, which aired at 8pm, the timeslot was revised to 6pm. Holdsworth explained that by placing Ackley Bridge in between The Simpsons and Hollyoaks, it would appeal to the younger audiences who watch the respective shows. Following the premiere of the first episode on 19 April, the series was made available to stream as a boxset on All 4. Caroline Hollick, Channel 4's head of drama, wrote that Ackley Bridge is the most-watched series on All 4 by 16-24s, and that the Ackley Bridge hashtag on TikTok had 82 million "hits" at the time of writing. These statistics motivated her to place younger viewers "at the heart of [their] new strategy", which led to the production changes.

== Cast ==
=== Main ===
- Sunetra Sarker as Kaneez Paracha
- Jo Joyner as Mandy Carter
- Nazmeen Kauser as Razia Paracha
- Cody Ryan as Hayley Booth
- Yousef Naseer as Saleem Paracha
- Lorraine Cheshire as Lorraine Bird
- Fern Deacon as Chloe Voyle
- Samantha Power as Simone Booth
- Megan Parkinson as Sam Murgatroyd
- Emily Pyzer as Candice Murgatroyd
- Tony Jayawardena as Rashid Hyatt
- Rob James-Collier as Martin Evershed
- Charlie Hardwick as Sue Carp
- Phoebe Tuffs-Berry as Rukhsana Ibrahim
- Zara Salim as Kacey 'Spud' Gartside
- Szymon Kantor as Pawel Nowicki
- Abdul Ahadbutt as Younis Iqbal
- Hareet Deol as Hassan Hussein
- Robyn Cara as Kayla Azfal
- Carla Woodcock as Marina Perry
- Yasmin Al-Khudhairi as Fizza Akhtar
- Ryan Dean as Johnny Cooper
- Jasmine Payne as Queenie Cooper
- Shobhit Piasa as Tahir Randhawa
- Olivia Marie Fearn as Rose Boswell
- Leena Dhingra as Zainab Hyatt

=== Recurring ===
- Razia Yousaf as Granny Paracha
- James Senneck as Clint Northwood
- George Potts as Ken Weaver
- Shahid Ahmed as Zaffar Iqbal
- Freddie Bolt as Reece Murgatroyd
- Gemma Paige North as Jules Perry
- Raj Ghatak as Asif Akhtar
- Myra Sofia as Zara Akhtar
- Goldy Notay as Miriam Akhtar
- Louis De Gregory as Gav Hadley

=== Guest ===
- Zain Khan as Zain Younis
- India Parsan as Tahira Abad
- Arbaz Rashid as Waqar Abdelrahman
- Jessica Kaliisa as Gaynor Evershed
- Connor McIntyre as Grandad Cooper
- Chan Shoker as Mo Azfal
- Kiran L. Dadlani as Humera
- Amer Nazir as Sajid
- Bernard Wrigley as Tahir's Neighbour
- Ole Madden as Liam
- Neil Hurst as Priest

== Episodes ==
No. overall	No. in series	Title	Directed by	Written by	Original release date
27	1	"Episode 1"	Joe Stephenson	Ayub Khan Din	19 April 2021
Whilst arriving at school, Kayla sees traveller Johnny arrive on a horse and forms a crush on him. Her half-sister Marina invites Johnny to her party and pets his horse, which excretes on her. They all laugh at Marina, and as revenge, Marina sets up a fundraising website for Kayla's supposed body hair removal. When Johnny sees Marina, he grabs her phone and breaks it. Kayla and Fizza interrupt Marina's party, where they talk about having body hair, to Marina's annoyance. Kayla then sees Fizza kissing Johnny at the party.
28	2	"Episode 2"	Joe Stephenson	Ayub Khan Din	19 April 2021
Sue and Martin discover that there have been a string of robberies at the school. Sue accuses the travellers, but Sam later discovers that the Murgatroyds are responsible for the robberies and tells Martin. After Mandy reveals that she is leaving her role as headteacher, Martin applies for it and receives the job. Martin attends couples counselling with wife Gaynor, who feels that he is focusing on his career too much. She later ends their marriage. Rashid informs that his mother Zainab will be visiting them; Zainab immediately takes a dislike to Kaneez. Johnny wants to begin a relationship with Fizza, but when he returns home, his grandfather mentions him getting married soon.
29	3	"Episode 3"	Joe Stephenson	Suhayla El-Bushra	19 April 2021
After Fizza's mother Miriam learns that she has taken her young sister Zara to their father Asif's drag performance, she leads an anti-sex education protest at Ackley Bridge College. At the protest, Fizza meets Gav, a counter-protester, who invites her to an LGBTQ+ poetry night. Miriam forbids them from seeing Zara, but Fizza takes her horse-riding with Johnny, where she gets injured. Miriam takes Zara home, and tells Fizza to not see either of them again. Fizza reads a poem about her relationship with her mother, which Miriam arrives to hear. However, when the protestors follow her, Fizza assumes she targeted the poetry night and disowns her. Miriam is then confronted in the street by two hooded men.
30	4	"Episode 4"	Joe Stephenson	Kim Revill	19 April 2021
Kaneez discovers Tahir in bed with Hayley and tells him not to mess her around as she is still grieving for Missy. Hayley posts online that they are in a relationship, which he is shocked by. He tells Hayley that his parents have died, which she learns is a lie. Disgusted by his lies about death due to Missy's death, she dumps him. Tahir learns of Sam's broken relationship with her family and decides to write her a false letter from her mother from prison. He writes that Sam can stay with Nadine following her release. However, Nadine is unexpectedly released on parole, so Sam leaves her hostel to stay with her. When Tahir learns, he admits that he has been writing the letters. He then confides in Sam that his mother died from cancer, which he blames himself for. Simone informs Fizza that her mother has been attacked. She visits Miriam, who blames Fizza for her attack. Johnny texts Fizza, inviting her to a performance, but the text is deleted.
31	5	"Episode 5"	Joe Stephenson	Kim Revill	19 April 2021
Fizza blames her mother for deleting the text from Johnny, despite Kayla being responsible. She admits to deleting the text, and Fizza brands her a bad friend. Fizza and Johnny are locked in the music room together, where Johnny has sex with Fizza. Mandy reveals to the staff that she has been offered the opportunity to start a school in Nepal, which upsets Kaneez due to their close friendship. The pair talk, and Kaneez badmouths Zainab, who overhears and insults Kaneez.
32	6	"Episode 6"	Ethosheia Hylton	Kam Odedra	19 April 2021
Marina goes into school with Jules' bag, and when Kayla notices, the pair fight and the contents of the bag, including a bag of marijuana, is spilled onto the floor. Fizza takes the drugs so that Kayla does not get expelled, and forgives her. Kayla then realises her father is dealing drugs again. Zainab accompanies Martin and Kaneez on a school trip, and to Kaneez's annoyance, she takes over when she teaches the children. Martin downloads a dating app and begins talking to a woman named Jane located nearby. Fizza reveals to Kayla that she had sex with Johnny, but states that they are friends and that she prefers Gav. Johnny asks Kayla why she deleted the text, and she claims that she was protecting Fizza. However, when the pair wander off from the school trip together, she kisses him. Martin finds the pair, and informs Johnny that his grandfather has had a heart attack. He then dies in hospital.
33	7	"Episode 7"	Ethosheia Hylton	Kim Revill	19 April 2021
To pay for his grandfather's funeral, Johnny arranges to fight somebody, which he loses. Fizza tells Kayla that despite initially wanting to be friends, she has a crush on Johnny, which Kayla tells him. Marina is revealed to be Jane, the woman Martin is talking to on a dating app. Johnny tells Martin that he is an embarrassment, revealing it is Marina talking to him. He texts Marina on the app, telling her that he knows it is her. Martin discovers a plan to develop Ackley Bridge College into housing. When Zainab almost collapses, she tells Kaneez that she is being too harsh on her and agrees to stop. She reveals that she has always lied about her parents being successful, and that her mother was a sex worker and she never knew her father. In return, Kaneez tells Zainab that she may be pregnant.
34	8	"Episode 8"	Ethosheia Hylton	Alex Stewart	19 April 2021
Kaneez takes a pregnancy test, which comes out negative. Zainab tells Rashid about the pregnancy, who confronts her. Kaneez confides in him, and he says that he will tell Zainab to stop being mean to her. Martin calls Jules in to talk about Marina catfishing him, and realises that she used Jules' photographs for the fake profile. Martin asks Jules to attend his parents' meeting regarding the plan to turn the school into housing. Afterwards, the pair kiss. Fizza goes to apologise to her mother, but Miriam tells Fizza that she is responsible for their family breaking apart. Gav invites Fizza to an art show and when she is offended by the islamophobic meaning depicted in his art, she realises that Gav attacked her mother. He is then arrested. Johnny comforts Fizza and in return, she tries to kiss him, but he avoids the kiss. Queenie then informs Fizza and Kayla that Johnny will soon marry Rose.
35	9	"Episode 9"	Ethosheia Hylton	Ayub Khan Din	19 April 2021
Hayley discovers a pregnancy test in Kaneez's bathroom cupboard, and tells Razia that she knows how to fake a positive test. She tricks Tahir into thinking she is pregnant which makes Kaneez furious due to thinking he is irresponsible. Kaneez later tells Rashid that she is jealous that Hayley is pregnant and not her. Tahir goes to visit his father in Manchester, but he is not there. He returns to Ackley Bridge where he learns that Kaneez knew his father had gone, and Hayley tells him the pregnancy was a joke. Tahir leaves, and Zainab jokes about another man leaving Kaneez. Rashid confronts her and tells her to go back to Pakistan since he loves Kaneez. Fizza learns that Kayla and Johnny kissed, leaving Fizza feel betrayed. The pair argue, and Kayla tells Fizza that she is a bad friend since she could not see her feelings for Johnny. Johnny confides in Tahir that he does not want to marry Rose since he loves someone else.
36	10	"Episode 10"	Ethosheia Hylton	Ayub Khan Din	19 April 2021
Marina and Kayla see Martin leave their house after spending the night with Jules. Kayla tells Marina and Jules that she is fine with Johnny's wedding, but they do not believe her. Marina later apologises to Kayla for her behaviour. Fizza and Kayla reconcile their friendship, and decide to attend Johnny's wedding to Rose. A boy named Liam interrupts the wedding to say he loves Rose, and Johnny comes clean about his romantic feelings for Kayla. The pair run away from the wedding and kiss on a bus. Kaneez apologises to Tahir for not telling him the truth about his father leaving and says that he is welcome in their family.
