= Nasreen Paracha =

Fictional character from Ackley Bridge

- Ackley Bridge character
- First appearance: Episode 1; 7 June 2017
- Last appearance: Episode 26; 6 August 2019
- Portrayed by: Amy-Leigh Hickman

In-universe information
- Occupation: Student
- Relatives: Kaneez Paracha (mother); Iqbal Paracha (father); Razia Paracha (sister); Saleem Paracha (brother); Aaron Turner (half-brother); Granny Paracha (grandmother)
- Religion: Muslim

Nasreen Paracha is a fictional character from the Channel 4 school drama Ackley Bridge, portrayed by Amy-Leigh Hickman. Nasreen first appeared in the pilot episode of the series, first broadcast on 7 June 2017. Nasreen is introduced as one of the programme's two protagonists, alongside best friend Missy Booth (Poppy Lee Friar). Her lifelong friendship with Missy is a major theme in the series, despite the differences in culture between the pair. Another aspect of Nasreen's life that is explored in Ackley Bridge is her sexuality, as she navigates coming out as a lesbian in a Muslim community.

As well as Hickman's portrayal of the character generating a positive reception from viewers and critics, Hickman was awarded the Actor award at the 2020 RTS Yorkshire Awards. Nasreen appears in the series until the end of the third series, when Hickman left to pursue a role in Our Girl and other projects.

== Storylines ==
Nasreen is introduced alongside lifelong best friend Missy Booth (Poppy Lee Friar), when the pair are drinking cider on a sofa inside a skip on their street. The next day, the pair start at Ackley Bridge College, having previously attended different schools. Due to Missy retaking a year, she is placed in the year group below Nasreen. Nasreen's friend Alya Nawaz (Maariah Hussain) immediately disapproves of Missy, due to the way she talks and dresses. In order to fit in with Alya's group of friends, Nasreen begins wearing a hijab and shuns Missy. When Missy confronts her and exposes her for drinking, the pair fight and are taken in to see headteacher Mandy Carter (Jo Joyner), who gives them a formal warning. When Cory Wilson (Sam Retford) flirts with Nasreen and kisses her, she discovers that Missy asked Cory to have sex with Nasreen, as revenge.

Despite still being angry with Missy, she agrees to help her find her missing mother, Simone Booth (Sam Power). While on the way home, Nasreen comes out to Missy as a lesbian. She also reveals that she has slept with teacher Lila Shariff (Anneika Rose) when the pair knew each other at Nasreen's former school. Nasreen begins to rekindle her relationship with Lila when the pair kiss, but Lila later tells her that they cannot have a relationship since she is a teacher. Nasreen learns that her father Iqbal (Narinda Samra) is arranging a marriage for her, with an unnamed boy in Pakistan. Initially reluctant to marry him, she later agrees to it, out of fear to come out. Nasreen struggles with the idea of being in a loveless marriage to a man and comes out to mother Kaneez (Sunetra Sarker), who is initially disgusted with Nasreen, but later accepts her sexuality. Kaneez goes on to introduce her to gay Muslim Naveed Haider (Gurjeet Singh), who she can have a fake arranged marriage with. Aaron Turner (Adam Fielding) approaches Nasreen on the street, and informs her that he is her half-brother, and gives her the address of his house. She arrives to find Iqbal there, and that he has a secret family. Due to feeling like she cannot experience any other lies, she cancels the fake marriage with Naveed. While at mosque, Nasreen's trainers are stolen by Sam Murgatroyd (Megan Parkinson), an Islamophobic lesbian attending Ackley Bridge College. Despite their differing views on race, the two have sex, and begin a secret relationship. When sister Razia (Nazmeen Kauser) has a fight with Sam, Nasreen intercepts and is accidentally stabbed by Razia.

Nasreen decides to apply for a place at Oxford University, and Missy accompanies her to her interview. Missy confides in Nasreen about her plans for the future, which Nasreen mocks. The pair argue, but later reconcile their friendship. While walking on the street, the pair are hit by a speeding car driven by Anwar Wazir (Antonio Aakeel). The pair initially survive the accident, but Nasreen is distraught when she finds Missy's dead body in her bed, who has died as a result of internal bleeding. Angry with Anwar over Missy's death, she asks Sam to order the Murgatroyd family to attack him, but later disgusted with herself for her violent actions, she confides in Kaneez. Still grieving over Missy, Nasreen stops attending school in order to work at a factory, but after Kaneez and Naveed's disapproval, she rejoins school. Nasreen kisses classmate Chloe Voyle (Fern Deacon) at a party, who outs Nasreen. Initially petrified to come out due to the Muslim community's opinion on homosexuality, Nasreen takes pride in herself and comes out as a lesbian at school. She later takes her A Level exams, which she underperforms in, meaning she cannot attend Oxford. However, unbeknownst to Nasreen, Kaneez drives to the university and pleads with them to let Nasreen attend despite her results, to which they eventually agree. Nasreen then spreads Missy's ashes and leaves for university.

== Development ==
Radio Times described Nasreen as a "brave hearted soul", "strong and intelligent", as well as "extremely close to her best friend Missy". They added that she "knows who she is, but navigating her sexuality and the expectations of her family and community is quite a challenge". Actress Hickman voiced her admiration for the character, and likes that she is a determined person. Hickman has talked about the impact that Nasreen being a lesbian Muslim has had, such as Asian girls tweeting her or approaching her in real life to thank her for the storyline. She stated that she does not just portray the role for a job, but felt that it is "something for the greater good". Hickman described Nasreen's decision to not enter an arranged marriage as a "huge step", and stated that since Nasreen is only 17, she wants to have fun dating. She added that she is happy that Nasreen became "more of a normal teenager", and that when she read the scripts, she was pleased to see her character having more fun. Hickman likened the character to herself in the sense that friendship are important to the pair of them. Hickman stated that she feels a sense of pressure to portray Nasreen, due to the responsibility she feels due to how "important it is". In 2018, it is announced that Nasreen will develop a relationship with Sam. Hickman stated that Nasreen is "definitely ready" for a romantic relationship, adding that "someone comes into her life that is completely right for her and she ends up falling in love".

Hickman described Nasreen's connection with Missy as a "lovely friendship", accrediting their onscreen spark to her friendship with Friar in real life, adding that they make each other laugh between takes. She stated that the characters are "beyond best friends", owing their close bond to being born on the same day in the same hospital, and living next to each other. She described them as "practically sisters", and opined that their "sisterhood is beautiful" since they "bring out the best qualities in one another". On their difference in culture, Hickman felt that love is one of the main qualities that brought the characters closer. When asked if she would do a third series of Ackley Bridge, Hickman stated that she would be eager to continue portraying Nasreen due to "the effect she has on girls", adding that she loves "every single story" that the programme tells. In the third series, Hickman explained that Nasreen is "on her way to bagging herself a place at Oxford University", which is "a million miles away from the town she grew up in and knows". She stated that at her character's young age, she has dealt with a lot of difficulties, including her friendships, relationships, sexuality, and religion. Hickman added that Nasreen depends on Missy and Kaneez for happiness "most of the time". She noted that Nasreen worries about leaving Missy behind since they are "facing very different life paths". Since Missy helps her to see the positive in situations, she worries that she will not be happy without Missy. It was hinted by Channel 4 that "something massively dramatic happens involving Missy and Nas" in the third series, which Hickman opined that people would be "really shocked". She felt that the series was the "most gripping" so far and would "grab the audience's heart".

After the death of Missy in series three, Hickman described filming her final scenes with Friar as "traumatic" and "hard", since Friar "really was leaving the show". She explained that "felt a little close to the bone because it really was the end of Missy and Nas", and that there was an authenticity in the emotions displayed in the scenes. On the departure of Friar, Hickman stated: "I as myself just like Nas, had to find my place without Poppy just like Nas did without Missy". Digital Spy noted that after the death of Missy, Nasreen's character development headed into a different direction, with them acknowledging that she "bridges the gap from adolescence to adulthood". In 2019, it was announced that she would be departing from the cast of Ackley Bridge after the third series, with Hickman taking on a role in the BBC drama series Our Girl. Hickman missed the physical training requires for Our Girl in order to finish her tenure on Ackley Bridge. She explained that while on set, she was on the phone to the military advisor on Our Girl who let her know what everybody was doing while she was not there.

== Reception ==
A letter about Hickman's portrayal of Nasreen was published in an issue of What's on TV, as the "star letter". She was described by the viewer as the "star of the show", and they could see why she had been cast in Our Girl following her tenure on the series. Nasreen was listed as one of Autostraddle's Favourite Lesbian, Bisexual and Trans TV Characters of 2019, and was described as "groundbreaking". It was noted that representation of Muslims on primetime television is rare, and that "to have a young queer Muslim woman as, essentially, the lead character in an ensemble show" was something to be praised. For her role as Nasreen, Hickman was awarded the Actor award at the 2020 RTS Yorkshire Awards. Hickman expressed her gratitude for comments made about Nasreen on social media, which she described as "amazing and truly overwhelming". She enjoyed being able to reach "people in their homes" and help them in their personal lives. She added that people on the street often approached her to tell her their experiences of coming out to their parents due to Nasreen's impact on them. Hickman stated: "there are no words no describe how incredible it is to know that this show is doing something for the greater good for people."
