= Missy Booth =

Fictional character from Ackley Bridge

- Ackley Bridge character
- First appearance: Episode 1; 7 June 2017
- Last appearance: Episode 20; 25 June 2019
- Portrayed by: Poppy Lee Friar

In-universe information
- Occupation: Student; Fast food worker
- Relatives: Simone Booth (mother); Hayley Booth (sister); Julie Booth (grandmother)

Missy Booth is a fictional character from the Channel 4 school drama Ackley Bridge, portrayed by Poppy Lee Friar. Missy first appeared in the pilot episode of the series, first broadcast on 7 June 2017. She is introduced as one of the programme's two protagonists alongside best friend Nasreen Paracha (Amy-Leigh Hickman). Due to growing up with numerous responsibilities including being the carer of her family, Friar described her character as a "fighter". Despite this, Missy is also seen to be a rebellious and opinionated character who is popular at school, especially with the male students. One of the main themes explored throughout the series is her friendship with Nasreen, which Channel 4 billed as the "heart of the show". Both Friar and Hickman have accredited this to their real-life friendship, which they felt mirrored their onscreen friendship.

Friar received praise from critics for her portrayal of the character, whose storylines included her grandmother's death, her sister being taken into foster care and getting an abortion. Missy appears in the series until the second episode of the third series, when Friar left to pursue other acting projects. Missy's final scenes see her die shortly after being hit by a car; fans have voiced their disappointment in her death, with many stating that the series has not been the same since her departure. Despite this, they felt that her death allowed for numerous powerful storylines to commence, such as Nasreen's grief and the students of the fictional school mourning for her. Critics were disappointed to see her departure from the series, but commended the "bold decision" to kill a centric character. In 2021, Missy's death was described as "one of the most harrowing moments of the series" to date.

== Storylines ==
Missy is introduced alongside lifelong best friend Nasreen Paracha (Amy-Leigh Hickman), when the pair are drinking cider on a sofa inside a skip on their street. The next day, the pair start at Ackley Bridge College, having previously attended different schools. Due to Missy retaking a year, she is placed in the year group below Nasreen. Nasreen's friend Alya Nawaz (Maariah Hussain) immediately disapproves of Missy due to the way she talks and dresses. To fit in with Alya's group of friends, Nasreen shuns Missy. When Missy confronts her and exposes her for drinking, the pair fight and are taken in to see headteacher Mandy Carter (Jo Joyner), who gives them a formal warning. To get revenge on Nasreen, Missy orders Cory Wilson (Sam Retford) to have sex with Nasreen, offering to have sex with Cory if he does it. She later regrets her decision and admits what she has done when she sees Cory kissing Nasreen. Missy returns home to grandmother Julie (Rita May) worrying about her money being stolen; Missy suspects that her mother Simone (Samantha Power) has stolen the money and enlists Nasreen's help to find her, despite the pair still arguing. The pair get hold of the money and on the way home, Nasreen comes out to Missy as a lesbian.

Before going to school, Missy goes upstairs to help Julie get out of the bath but is distraught to find her dead in the bath. Unsure of what to do, she leaves her body and goes to school. She later confides in Nasreen but tells her to keep it a secret, since there is no longer a legal guardian to look after sister Hayley (Cody Ryan). Teacher Emma Keane (Liz White) finds out and reports Julie's death to the social board, who put Hayley into foster care. With the help of Simone, Missy eventually regains custody of Hayley. Missy runs out of the exam hall during a GCSE mock exam due to stress and is later informed that due to low results in her year group, underperforming students will be removed from non-core subjects. Upset that she cannot attend drama class, Missy quits school and begins working in a food truck to earn money. Headteacher Mandy visits her and informs her that if she attends school again, she can star in the school play, to which she agrees. Missy begins a relationship with Nasreen's half-brother Aaron Turner (Adam Fielding). When he surprises her with a firework display, she proposes to him. She later becomes pregnant with his baby and tells Aaron, who is delighted. However, feeling it is too soon to have a child, she has an abortion. Aaron finds out and is angry that Missy did not consult him; he then ends the relationship.

Missy starts at sixth form with Nasreen, who is planning to go to Oxford University. Missy hides her upset at the thought of Nasreen leaving and their lives changing, deciding to support her instead. She accompanies Nasreen to Oxford to attend her interview and when Nasreen becomes scared about being rejected, Missy convinces her to attend it. When they return home, Missy confides in Nasreen that she plans to leave school again to join the fair. Nasreen laughs and accuses Missy of "throwing her life away" like her mother. Missy retaliates by slapping Nasreen. The pair eventually make up with each other and while walking home, they are hit by a speeding car driven by Anwar Wazir (Antonio Aakeel). Missy survives with two broken arms, but when she goes to bed, she is shocked to see her dead grandmother, who informs Missy that she has died. Nasreen visits Missy and is distraught to find her dead body. Missy then appears in Nasreen's imagination, where the pair discuss their friendship.

== Development ==
In an interview with Channel 4, actress Friar described Missy as a survivor and the glue of her family, but noted that Missy also has a rebellious side and that she can be tough and opinionated, which gets her into trouble. She explained that her character "can rub people up the wrong way as her mouth can run away from her". Friar stated that Missy is very popular at school, especially with the male students who love her since she is "saucy and sassy", but also because they know Missy would never be interested in them. She also described her character as streetwise and someone who is constantly self-sacrificing for the people around her. Friar opined that Missy has grown up with so much responsibility, but felt that she does it out of love and loyalty to her friends and family. When asked about the similarities and differences between herself and her character, she stated that like Missy, she is family orientated, kind, caring and loyal, but that she does not dress like Missy, nor does she have a Northern accent. Radio Times stated that Missy has had "a pretty tough start in life" as a result of looking after her mother and sister and dealing with the death of her grandmother. Despite her troubling life, Friar felt that Missy is a "fighter".

Speaking about her favourite scenes to film, Friar recalled the ice skating scenes in series one, episode five, since she enjoyed working with Sunetra Sarker. She also mentioned the first scene in series one, episode one, where Missy and Nasreen are sat inside of the skip. To combat the cold weather, the pair of actresses hid hot water bottles inside of their outfits, which they found hilarious. Missy and Nasreen's friendship is one of the main themes throughout their tenures on the series. Their backstory involves having grown up together and their families being entwined, which Friar explained leads to zero prejudice of culture and colour between them. Channel 4 billed their friendship "the heart of the show"; the actresses felt lucky to have each other since their offscreen friendship mirrors their onscreen chemistry together. Co-star Hickman echoed this when she stated that their onscreen spark is owed to her friendship with Friar in real life, adding that they make each other laugh between takes. On Missy's arguments with Nasreen in the first few episodes, Friar stated that Nasreen's comments about Simone made Missy's protective streak kick in and their friendship hits "rocky territory". Friar found the contrast between their friendship and rivalry was interesting to portray. She noted the difference between Missy and Nasreen's career aspirations, stating that Missy's low grades and lack of direction might mean that she will feel trapped in a life she does not want and that it makes her feel angry towards Nasreen.

In an episode broadcast on 25 June 2019, Missy dies in previously unannounced scenes. This was written in response to Friar leaving the series to pursue other acting projects. After they aired, Friar gave an exclusive interview to Radio Times. She felt the scenes were sad for the cast, characters and the fans of the series. She found it especially sad to say goodbye to Missy since she had played her for three years, adding that she adored playing her and that she will stay in her heart. Friar was grateful to have played "a rich character" who she found "fun, emotional, witty, sassy, strong, loving and lovable". Friar found filming her last scenes emotional, which she accredited to leaving her "onset family" who she had grown close to over the three years. The scene she found the most emotive to film was where Missy and Nasreen are talking on the skip for the final time in Nasreen's imagination. She said that the scene symbolised having come "full circle" due to the skip being iconic to their friendship. She explained: "everything happened up there, laughs, confessions, tears, gossip." On her departure from the series, Friar stated that Ackley Bridge meant a great deal to her and that she enjoyed every aspect of appearing on the series. Hickman found it hard to film her final scenes with Friar, she explained that it "felt a little close to the bone because it really was the end of Missy and Nas". Hickman also said that the emotions displayed in the scenes were real. After her departure, Hickman stated: "I as myself just like Nas, had to find my place without Poppy just like Nas did without Missy".

== Reception ==
Friar received critical acclaim throughout her tenure on Ackley Bridge, being labelled as a "powerful actress". Friar's performance throughout series one was praised by Daljinder Johal of Desiblitz, who described it as "powerful". Friar received praise from viewers in the fourth episode of series one, where the episode revolved around Missy dealing with the death of her grandmother, which leads to Hayley being placed in care. Rianne Houghton of Digital Spy praised Friar for her performance during the teenage pregnancy storyline in series two, as well as the portrayal of "supportive female friendships". She also praised the "realistic and balanced portrayal of teen pregnancy and abortion".

After Missy's death, Paul Fogarty of HITC stated that "Ackley Bridge will never be the same again", and Digital Spy's Filiz Mehmedova wrote that they were not emotionally ready for her death. Viewers of the programme expressed their upset and outrage with Missy's death, with Digital Spy noting that viewers complained about the "shocking twist". Becky Freeth of the Metro described the scenes as a "gut-wrenching plot twist" that caught many viewers off-guard and noted that viewers expected Missy to survive the car accident. Despite the negative reactions to Missy's death, many viewers praised the storyline for how her death was dealt with by other characters, such as Nasreen's anger and students setting off lanterns at a vigil for her, the latter of which was described as "one of the most powerful Ackley Bridge scenes of all time". Freeth stated that it was a "poignant and tragic time" to kill off Missy just as she had found happiness, while HITC praised the "bold decision" to kill a centric character, stating that it makes sense for Missy to be the character who died, since the death of a "larger than life character" would have had the largest impact on the audience. Reflecting on her death after the fourth series had premiered in 2021, MSN's Katie Palmer wrote that her death "marked one of the most harrowing moments of the series" and that fans still mourned her years later.
