= Kaneez Paracha =

Fictional character from Ackley Bridge

- Ackley Bridge character
- First appearance: Episode 1; 7 June 2017
- Last appearance: Episode 46; 11 July 2022
- Portrayed by: Sunetra Sarker

In-universe information
- Occupation: School cook; Student support officer; School counsellor
- Spouse: Iqbal Paracha (until 2018)
- Significant other: Rashid Hyatt
- Children: Nasreen Paracha (daughter); Razia Paracha (daughter); Saleem Paracha (son)
- Relatives: Granny Paracha (mother); Tahir Randhawa (nephew)

Kaneez Paracha is a fictional character from the Channel 4 school drama Ackley Bridge, portrayed by Sunetra Sarker. Kaneez first appeared in the pilot episode of the series, first broadcast on 7 June 2017. Kaneez is the mother of protagonist Nasreen (Amy-Leigh Hickman), as well as Razia (Nazmeen Kauser) and Saleem (Esa Ashraf/Yaseen Khan). Kaneez's storylines in the series have included ending her arranged marriage with her husband Iqbal (Narinder Samra), pursuing a relationship with science teacher Rashid Hyatt (Tony Jayawardena) and becoming a student support officer.

Kaneez has been described as a feisty, vocal and passionate woman who has become a prominent voice in her local community. Sarker was attracted to the role of Kaneez due to the lack of Pakistani northerners shown in media, as well as Pakistani women with large personalities. She pushed for Kaneez to have a mixture of northern and Pakistani accents and to be a working-class character, since it differed from the roles she had played previously. Sarker learned Punjabi for the role and was given a voice coach to help her perfect Kaneez's accent. Viewers and critics have praised Kaneez, with her being described as a matriarch, a queen of comedy and a feminist icon. She also won the award for Best TV Character at the 2019 Asian Media Awards.

== Storylines ==
Kaneez is introduced as the mother of Nasreen (Amy-Leigh Hickman), Razia (Nazmeen Kauser) and Saleem Paracha (Esa Ashraf/Yaseen Khan), as well as a school cook at the multicultural academy school Ackley Bridge College. Kaneez learns that husband Iqbal (Narinder Samra) is attempting to have Nasreen enter an arranged marriage, which Kaneez disagrees with due to being forced to quit school as a teenager to marry Iqbal. When Nasreen refuses to get married and comes out to Kaneez as a lesbian, she is initially disgusted with her. However, after Nasreen's best friend Missy Booth (Poppy Lee Friar) talks to her about Nasreen's struggles, Kaneez takes it upon herself to understand Nasreen and her sexuality. She visits Hebden Bridge and talks to a lesbian who explains her lifestyle to Kaneez.

When Nasreen discovers that Iqbal has another family that live in Bradford, she informs Kaneez, who already knew. She visits Sandra Turner (Vicky Entwistle), his other wife, and professes that Sandra can have him to herself, claiming she has never loved Iqbal. Afterwards, she throws his belongings out of the window and states that it is her house. Science teacher Rashid Hyatt (Tony Jayawardena) informs Kaneez that Razia has dyspraxia, and despite her initial disagreement and anger at Rashid, she accepts that he is right. She then goes on a date with him but struggles with insecurities due to never having dated someone. Rashid assures her that what she is doing is normal and invites Kaneez to a university reunion, which she initially declines. However, she changes her mind and when she arrives, she sees him hugging his friend and assumes that he has moved on. Rashid is puzzled when Kaneez ignores his advances the next day, so she explains what she saw at the reunion. He later professes his romantic feelings for her, which she does in return, and the two begin a relationship. Kaneez then visits Iqbal and informs him that she wants a divorce. She reveals their relationship to her children, who accept their relationship since they like Rashid. When Kaneez feels as though Nasreen does not talk to her and discovers that she is using dating apps, Kaneez makes a fake profile to talk to her with. Missy finds out what she has done and advises her to delete the profile since Nasreen is developing feelings for the woman she believes is real. When Kaneez messages Nasreen to inform her that she is deleting her profile, Nasreen sends her a nude photo to persuade her to keep the app. Kaneez storms into her room and forbids her from sending nude photos, revealing that the account was her in the process. Nasreen is mad with Kaneez but promises to talk to her more, as long as she respects her boundaries. Kaneez feels she has more to offer at the school and trains to become a student support officer. After Nasreen performs poorly in her A Level exams, Kaneez drives to Oxford University, Nasreen's dream university, and pleads with them to let Nasreen attend despite her results, to which they eventually agree.

Rashid informs Kaneez that his mother Zainab (Leena Dhingra) will be visiting them; Zainab immediately takes a dislike to Kaneez. Kaneez discovers her nephew Tahir Randhawa (Shobhit Piasa) in bed with Missy's sister Hayley Booth (Cody Ryan) and tells him not to mess her around as she is still grieving for Missy. Mandy reveals to the staff that she has been offered the opportunity to start a school in Nepal, which upsets Kaneez due to their close friendship. The pair talk and Kaneez badmouths Zainab, who overhears and insults Kaneez. Zainab accompanies Kaneez and interim headteacher Martin Evershed (Rob James-Collier) on a school trip and to Kaneez's annoyance, she takes over when she begins to teach the students. When Zainab almost collapses, she tells Kaneez that she is being too harsh on her and agrees to stop. She reveals that she has always lied about her parents being successful, and that her mother was a sex worker and she never knew her father. In return, Kaneez tells Zainab that she may be pregnant. Kaneez takes a pregnancy test, which comes out negative. Zainab tells Rashid about the pregnancy, who confronts her. Kaneez confides in him and he says that he will tell Zainab to stop being mean to her. When Hayley pranks Tahir into believing she is pregnant, Kaneez later tells Rashid that she is jealous that Hayley is pregnant and not her. After Zainab makes another rude comment about Kaneez, Rashid confronts her and tells her to go back to Pakistan since he loves Kaneez.

== Development ==
Upon the cast announcements for Ackley Bridge, Kaneez was billed as a "force of nature" who is full of personality and opinions. It was stated that as part of her backstory, she arrived in England at the age of 16 and became a prominent voice in the community, raising her family almost single-handedly while her husband Iqbal is away from home. Actress Sarker added that Kaneez's experiences with moving to England as a teenager has made her an example of self-learning and independence due to "finding her feet with the language and life skills". Sarker added that Kaneez is a woman she had never seen on television before due to being full of personality and opinions. She also liked that Kaneez is shown to be a good mother with a sense of humour while also having a protective streak and strictness. She described her character as a feisty woman who wears her heart on her sleeve who is also "a woman of substance, very vocal and passionate about caring for her children and her family [and] doesn’t really hold back on telling people what she thinks". She felt that Kaneez has a funny personality in a way Pakistani women are not shown to have in media. She also praised the series itself for its "three-dimensional portrayal" of Pakistani women, specifically praising the stories that her character receives for being "all about this woman being a force to be reckoned with". Prior to appearing in Ackley Bridge, Sarker starred in the BBC medical drama Casualty as Zoe Hanna for nine years. Following her exit from Casualty, she explained that she was looking for something different and described the role of Kaneez as "just the tonic". Part of this was attributed to Kaneez looking and sounding nothing like Sarker in real life, an aspect of the role that she liked.

On accepting the role of Kaneez, Sarker stated that it was rare for her to find a character that had been written as a three-dimensional Asian woman, and even rarer for her to be a northern Asian woman. Sarker noted how Kaneez displays westernised aspects side by side with her Islamic life and "blends both humour and truth in an authentic way", something she believes is not represented commonly in media. One of her motivations for accepting the role was wanting to represent single Muslim mothers, who she believed deserved a voice on television. Sarker enjoyed that the role of Kaneez is not glamour driven, since it means she is able to focus on the character, and "put vanity aside". On the styling of Kaneez, Sarker said that she wanted to be dressed in Pakistani clothes, commenting: "I don’t think there are many people in places like Cambridge who will have bumped into many women like Kaneez, so it is great that we are bringing them into their living rooms." Sarker also pushed for her character to speak with a northern Pakistani accent and to live a working-class life, since her previous roles were completely different. As Sarker does not speak Punjabi in real life while Kaneez does, Sarker had to learn the language for the role. She found it to be difficult but gave it her "best shot". Sarker recalled that while filming for Ackley Bridge, co-stars would tell her that she sounds just like their aunties and that her lines reminded them of their own mothers, which made her feel like she was "on the right lines". Sarker also had a voice coach to help her with Kaneez's accent, since during scenes, her accent can "naturally wander since different words have different emphasis". When asked about Kaneez's "colourful version of English", Sarker complimented the writers for writing the majority of Kaneez's lines, but revealed that a lot of Kaneez's comedic dialogue was invented by herself. Sarker calls the phrases 'Kaneezisms'. She referenced a joke she made about the Spice Girls in the first series that caused the people on set to laugh, therefore it was implemented into the script, since they knew it would appeal to viewers.

Sarker described the second series of Ackley Bridge as a liberating series for Kaneez, stating that her split from her husband contributed to Kaneez having "found her wings" wanting to "fly a little bit". She felt that Kaneez had become open to life's possibilities and that the first of these is learning to drive. Sarker deems herself a good driver in real life and found it difficult to play a bad driver. She joked that she would never get into a car with Kaneez, but that despite being bad, Kaneez "thinks she knows it all and should be on Top Gear". She also noted that the importance of the relationship she has with her children is reflected in the series. In the fourth series, Sarker affirmed that Kaneez is "still a force to be reckoned with". Sarker also took on the role of associate producer for the series. Kaneez is promoted to a school counsellor, which Sarker enjoyed playing. Due to a cast overhaul in the fourth series, Sarker was glad to have stayed on the show and felt that Kaneez had become a "foundation character", but confirmed that she would still have her own storylines. Kaneez's relationship with Rashid is further explored in the series when his mother Zainab arrives, who Sarker described as the "mother-in-law from hell". The series also sees Kaneez's relationship with nephew Tahir explored due to the exit of Nasreen in the third series.

== Reception ==
Shout Out UK described Kaneez as a "matriarch", stating that they were glad to continue seeing her after three series. Viewers have a positive opinion of Kaneez's humor, with her being described as an "icon" and a "queen of comedy". Dan Seddon of Digital Spy wrote that her scenes have "comic ingenuity", that himself and viewers are "blown away by Kaneez's knee-slapping antics" and joked that a statue of her should be placed at the fictional school. Following the storyline which saw Kaneez's inhibitions about dating Rashid, viewers praised both the series and the character for Kaneez's more serious scenes, with one describing her as "the feminist icon we need". Rianne Houghton of Digital Spy described the story as a "genuinely moving arc" and praised the character's development, adding that her kiss with Rashid was "one of the most heartwarming onscreen kisses we've seen". At the 2019 Asian Media Awards, Kaneez won the award for Best TV Character. Then at the 2021 TV Choice Awards, Sarker was nominated for Best Actress.
