= Mandy Carter =

Mandy Carter may refer to:

- Mandy Carter (Ackley Bridge), fictional character from the Channel 4 school drama
- Mandy Carter (activist) (born 1948), American LGBT rights activist
- Mandy Carter (Mandy), main character in the BBC TV series

== See also ==
- Amanda Carter (born 1964), Australian wheelchair basketball player
