= Mandy Carter (Ackley Bridge) =

Fictional character from Ackley Bridge

- Ackley Bridge character
- First appearance: Episode 1; 7 June 2017
- Last appearance: Episode 31; 19 April 2021
- Portrayed by: Jo Joyner

In-universe information
- Occupation: Headteacher
- Spouse: Steve Bell
- Significant other: Sadiq Nawaz
- Children: Oliver (son)
- Relatives: Dianne Carter (mother); Ray Carter (father)

Mandy Carter is a fictional character from the Channel 4 school drama Ackley Bridge, portrayed by Jo Joyner. Mandy first appeared in the pilot episode of the series, first broadcast on 7 June 2017. Mandy was initially introduced as the headteacher of the fictional Ackley Bridge school, and her storylines in the series have included the breakdown of her marriage to Steve Bell (Paul Nicholls), trying to help her mother escape from an abusive marriage to her father, trying to save her school and becoming pregnant.

Prior to her first appearance on the series, Mandy has dedicated several years to starting the school, which has led to her neglecting her marriage and having fun. Joyner has expressed her admiration for Mandy having a good professional life and a messy personal life, since she felt the contradiction is typically seen in great women. Joyner asked writers to explore Mandy's backstory in the second series; they responded by revealing that she has grown up with an abusive father. Joyner departed from Ackley Bridge in the fourth series. Mandy's exit was written as her feeling that the school no longer needed her, and Joyner stated that she felt the same way as her character. Joyner has been praised for her portrayal of Mandy, with Rianne Houghton of Digital Spy describing her as the "queen of Ackley Bridge".

== Storylines ==
Mandy is introduced as the headteacher of the multicultural academy school Ackley Bridge, a newly formed school built from the merging of a majority-white school and a majority-Asian school. Mandy is married to PE teacher Steve Bell (Paul Nicholls), who previously had an affair with netball teacher Claire Butterworth (Kimberley Walsh). While struggling with the challenges of the new school, Mandy has sex with Sadiq Nawaz (Adil Ray), the school sponsor, and the father of students Alya (Maariah Hussain) and Riz (Nohail Mohammed). She tells Steve, who is initially angry with Mandy, but later forgives her and reconciles their marriage. Mandy later discovers that she is pregnant and that Steve is the father of the child. Steve proposes that they get back together to support the child, but Mandy states that they do not work well as a couple.

When a drunk man is found in the toilets of the school, Mandy affirms that she will handle the situation. The man is revealed to be her abusive father Ray (Ted Robbins), who is claiming to have dementia. She offers to use her savings to put Ray in a residential care home, in order to give her mother Dianne (Lin Blakley) a more peaceful life. Mandy explains to her best friend Emma Keane (Liz White) that her dream as a child was to get a successful job, and save her mother from Ray. Mandy later learns that her parents were lying to her in order to use her money for a camper van to go travelling in.

Sadiq informs Mandy that as a result of his mattress company collapsing, he can no longer afford to fund the school, but pleads to continue as the school's sponsor due to the years of effort he has put into Ackley Bridge. Mandy convinces the school governors to allow Sadiq to stay on as the sponsor rather than be taken over by a trust, but when the placements for the new school year are 36 students down, it means that they lack approximately £250,000 in government funding. Mandy meets with the Valley Trust to discuss the future of the school, but when they cannot guarantee her the safety of staff members' job positions, she initially declines their offer, but later accepts. The trust asks Mandy to continue as headteacher, to which she accepts. Following the Valley Trust taking over the school, a number of employees are dismissed and replaced by new staff members, which Mandy expresses her annoyance with. When the time for Mandy to take her maternity leave arises, she is temporarily replaced by Sian Oakes (Ty Glaser). However, while on maternity leave, she learns that Sian has groomed student Cory Wilson (Sam Retford) and manipulated him into lying about it. Mandy then returns early to prove Cory's innocence.

Mandy lets Martin have the role of acting headteacher and later informs him that she has no plans to return as headteacher, only as a teacher. The job is advertised, and Mandy informs Martin that he has received the role. Mandy later tells the staff at Ackley Bridge College that she has received the opportunity to start an all-girls school in Nepal. She explains that the opportunity feels similar to when she started Ackley Bridge College, which leads her to accept. She reminisces with Kaneez on their friendship and leaves.

== Development ==
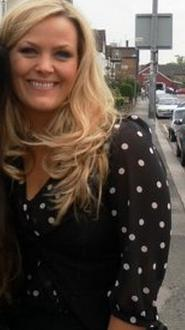
Jo Joyner portrays Mandy Carter.

Upon her casting, actress Joyner described her character Mandy as "hard working", and stated that prior to the pilot episode, Mandy has "dedicated the last few years to getting this school off the ground". She explained that in order to have a successful work career, Mandy has neglected areas of her life, such as having fun and her relationship with Steve. She added that Mandy is a perfectionist who "relishes the chance to do something great for the community and truly believes in the opportunities that good education can bring". Joyner noted that there is a contradiction between Mandy's personal and professional life, since she is "strong and capable when it comes to leadership and work", but her personal life is the "complete opposite". Joyner stated that she loves the contradiction, since it makes her a well-developed character, and added that the contradiction is often seen in great women. Joyner expressed her joy at the headteacher of the school being a woman, and liked that she is driven to achieve her goals.

Upon the renewal of Ackley Bridge for a second series, Joyner asked the writers to delve into her character's backstory. She told the writers: "I'd really like to know why she's so driven and why education means so much to her". Following this, her backstory was explored in a centric episode which revealed that she has an abusive father and grew up as an only child. Joyner appreciated the writers developing Mandy's past, since it shows "how hard she's worked to get out of her own home environment, which wasn't particularly fabulous". She described education as an escape for Mandy and said that her high expectations for students may initially look "unsympathetic" to viewers, but that the development will add more depth to her personality. Joyner explained that Mandy has a working class background, which means that she is "no push over" and does not "take any excuses" in regards to people not achieving at the school. She praised Mandy's drive to achieve, as she felt that Mandy's troubled past made it easy for her to be an underachiever. However, she used her life events as motivation to "climb up the ladder". She admitted that Mandy may not always be the most liked character, but felt that Mandy's actions have "good reason". Joyner explained that Mandy always prioritises the pupils at Ackley Bridge and what they can achieve, adding that Mandy is not as concerned with the figures at the school. When asked if Mandy is lonely due to being promoted to headteacher above her colleagues, Joyner confirms that she is, describing her as a "lone wolf". She felt that being an old child added to her loneliness. Joyner explained that since Mandy has been "forging ahead on her own ever since she was tiny", she became used to being on her own. This led to people having difficulty getting close to her.

Speaking about Mandy's marriage with Steve, Joyner stated that in the first few episodes, Mandy and Steve are seen to be "getting on well", but that it becomes "clear that they have had some issues that they've been dealing with from the past", in regards to his former affair with Claire. Joyner noted that despite Steve being Mandy's "rock", she feels resentment towards him due to his history with Claire. She added that Steve is "feeling quite insecure" due to Mandy spending time with Sadiq. Due to this, their relationship has lots of "ups and downs", and when they decide to live apart, they still miss each other. After Mandy and Sadiq have sex, Joyner described Mandy's mindset as having "got even" with Steve. Joyner noted that working with co-star Nicholls, whom she previously worked with on the BBC series Candy Cabs, was "really great", and she deemed herself lucky to work with him again. She added that they "work really well together", and that Nicholls aids the ease of being an on-screen partnership. Joyner was also able to work with former No Angels co-star Sunetra Sarker, and despite Mandy having a small number of scenes with her character Kaneez Paracha, Joyner stated that the decision was "probably for the best", since the two would make each other laugh during filming.

Whilst filming the fourth series, Joyner entered a "bubble" due to the impact of the COVID-19 pandemic on television with Sarker to be able to film scenes with her. In April 2021, Sarker revealed to Inside Soap that Joyner would be leaving Ackley Bridge in the fourth series. Joyner was grateful to be bubbled with Sarker since it meant they could hug when Joyner announced her exit from the series. Joyner felt proud to be involved with Ackley Bridge due to the well-written diversity. She stated that she would miss Mandy's drive to "bring people together and to believe that education was a route out for anyone who truly wanted it". When asked about her favourite moments of her character from the fourth series, Joyner replied that one is when she helped the Booth family in series one, since it showed "a lot of good teachers are so much more than just that to their students". Joyner also stated that she loved her scenes with Nicholls, as she felt that Mandy's scenes with Steve showed her "less in control". Joyner appeared on the ITV talk show Lorraine, where she was asked why she chose to leave the series. Joyner explained that Mandy leaves due to the school as it is "up and running" and does not need her anymore. Joyner likened her own feelings to Mandy's as she felt that the programme is established and therefore "it's time to move on".

== Reception ==
Following the episode that aired on 24 July 2018 which focused on Mandy's relationship with her parents, Joyner was praised for her portrayal of the role by viewers. Rianne Houghton of Digital Spy billed Joyner as "the queen of Ackley Bridge" and said that fans of the series are "claiming her as their own". Houghton noted that Twitter users were "singing [her] praises" and felt that she deserved awards for her portrayal of Mandy. Houghton agreed with the comments and wrote that the BBC soap opera EastEnders would benefit from Joyner returning to her previous role as Tanya Branning due to her acting capabilities. Joyner appeared on the ITV talk show Lorraine to discuss the scenes, where she explained that viewers would tell her every day how much they liked and admired the character. She noted that the messages were from people of all ages, which she appreciated. In an episode broadcast on 30 July 2019, the character was complimented by viewers due to her part in exposing a student-teacher affair, a storyline that viewers had previously reacted negatively to. She was also described as being "the most caring teacher ever" by Stephanie Chase of Digital Spy, with viewers adding that she is the "best teacher" on the series.
