= Jamie Dorrington =

English actor

- Born: 1 November 1984 (age 40); Leeds, West Yorkshire, England
- Occupation: Actor
- Years active: 2009–present
- Known for: The Endz; Emmerdale

Jamie Dorrington (born 1 November 1984) is an English actor known for his roles as Tommy in the Sky drama The Endz and Gaz in the ITV soap opera Emmerdale.

== Career ==
In 2011, Dorrington made his professional acting debut as Officer Johnson in the short film Summers and Winters. Later that year, he joined the cast of the Sky drama The Endz as Tommy. In 2012, Dorrington appeared In Airborne, a horror movie, as a security guard.

From 2014 to 2016, Dorrington appeared in three episodes of the ITV drama Happy Valley. In 2017, he appeared in two episodes of the Channel 4 drama Ackley Bridge as Jack Murgatroyd. In 2018, Dorrington appeared in ten episodes of the ITV soap opera Emmerdale as Gaz.
