= Adam Fielding (actor) =

English actor (born 1993)

- Born: 19 March 1993 (age 33); Birmingham, England
- Occupation: Actor
- Years active: 2014–present

Adam Fielding (born 19 March 1993) is an English actor. Working in British TV after drama school he was cast as Aaron Turner in the Channel 4 drama Ackley Bridge. Working in film, credits include Outside the Wire and 5LBS OF PRESSURE alongside Luke Evans, Alex Pettyfer and Rory Culkin.

== Career ==
Fielding made his television debut in 2014 as Kirin Kotecha in the ITV soap opera Emmerdale, a role which he portrayed until 2016. In 2017, he portrayed the role of Elijah Stubbs in two episodes of the BBC series In the Dark. In 2018, Fielding landed a role in Krypton, followed by the role of Aaron Turner in the Channel 4 drama Ackley Bridge. His character began a relationship with Missy Booth (Poppy Lee Friar), which resulted in the couple going through an abortion and mutually breaking up.

Working in film, credits include Outside the Wire and 5LBS OF PRESSURE alongside Luke Evans, Alex Pettyfer and Rory Culkin.

== Filmography ==
Year	Title	Role	Notes
2014–2016	Emmerdale	Kirin Kotecha	Series regular; 134 episodes
2017	In the Dark	Elijah Stubbs	2 episodes
2018	Krypton	Aspirant	1 episode
2018	Ackley Bridge	Aaron Turner	Main role
2021	Outside the Wire	Gomez	Supporting Role
2024	5LBS OF PRESSURE	Lewis	Significant Role
2026	The Trial of Michael Jackson	Michael Jackson	Main role
