= Charlie Hardwick =

English actress

- Born: Claire Elizabeth Hardwick; 3 November 1960 (age 65); Wallsend, Northumberland, England
- Occupation: Actress
- Years active: 1990–present
- Known for: Byker Grove; Purely Belter; Emmerdale; Ackley Bridge

Claire Elizabeth Hardwick (born 3 November 1960) is an English actress. She played Val Pollard in the ITV soap opera Emmerdale (2004–2015, 2017). In 2019, she began playing Sue Carp in the Channel 4 comedy-drama series Ackley Bridge.

== Career ==
In addition to her role in Emmerdale, Hardwick starred in the 2000 comedy film Purely Belter, and had a role in Billy Elliot. She won the best actress award at the Monte Carlo International Television Festival in 1998 for her role in Amber Films' The Scar, about a County Durham pit community in crisis. She also starred as Sian, a youth worker in Byker Grove.

In 1996 Hardwick starred in one episode of Our Friends In The North, in 2003, she played Maggie Thomas in an episode of The Royal. In 2007, Hardwick was an occasional contributor on Grumpy Old Women. For her role on Emmerdale, Hardwick has been nominated seven times at the British Soap Awards, winning in 2006 for Best Comedy Performance.

Hardwick has acted in a number of stage productions, including starring in Cooking with Elvis alongside Frank Skinner, which toured nationally. In 2012, she starred in the comedy play The Awkward Squad.

In 2019, Hardwick joined the third series of the Channel 4 comedy drama Ackley Bridge as Sue Carp.

== Awards and nominations ==
Year	Association	Category	Nominee(s)	Result	Ref.
2005	The British Soap Awards	Best Newcomer	Charlie Hardwick	Nominated	
2005	The British Soap Awards	Best On-Screen Partnership	Charlie Hardwick and Elizabeth Estensen	Nominated	
2006	The British Soap Awards	Best Comedy Performance	Charlie Hardwick	Won	
2007	The British Soap Awards	Best Comedy Performance	Charlie Hardwick	Nominated	
2008	The British Soap Awards	Best Comedy Performance	Charlie Hardwick	Nominated	
2011	The British Soap Awards	Best Comedy Performance	Charlie Hardwick	Nominated	
2014	The British Soap Awards	Best Actress	Charlie Hardwick	Nominated	
2014	The British Soap Awards	Best On-Screen Partnership	Charlie Hardwick and Chris Chittell	Nominated	
