= Ackley Bridge =

British television drama series

- Genre: Comedy drama
- Created by: Ayub Khan Din; Kevin Erlis; Malcolm Campbell
- Starring: Full list
- Composer: Tim Phillips
- Country of origin: United Kingdom
- Original language: English
- No. of series: 5
- No. of episodes: 46 (list of episodes)

Production
- Executive producers: Malcolm Campbell; George Faber; George Ormond; Ayub Khan-Din
- Producer: Alexander Lamb
- Production locations: Halifax, West Yorkshire, England
- Cinematography: Anna Valdez-Hanks; Sergio Delgado
- Editors: Anthony Combes; Vicky Tooms; Dan Crinnion; David Stark; David I'Anson
- Running time: 45 minutes (series 1–3); 23 minutes (series 4–5)
- Production company: The Forge

Original release
- Network: Channel 4; All 4
- Release: 7 June 2017 – 11 July 2022

Ackley Bridge is a British comedy drama series that aired from 2017 to 2022 on Channel 4 and later on streaming platform All 4. Filmed in Halifax, West Yorkshire, it is set in a multicultural academy school in the fictional town of Ackley.

The first three series of Ackley Bridge received praise from critics and viewers, who liked that the programme represented minority groups and tackled real-world issues. Main cast members Poppy Lee Friar, Amy-Leigh Hickman and Sunetra Sarker have received awards for their portrayals of their respective characters, as well as the series itself garnering awards and nominations at various ceremonies.

In the fourth series, Ackley Bridge saw a major overhaul, including a platform switch, different time slots, a shortened runtime, and several new characters to replace cast exits. It received poor reviews, claiming that the move to a 6pm time slot had led to the edgy storylines being softened and that the long-term characters did not receive enough screen-time. Following a fifth series that received a late night slot, Channel 4 confirmed that they had decided not to renew Ackley Bridge further.

== Production ==
In early 2017, Channel 4 announced The ABC, a six-part school drama produced by The Forge. The series follows the merger of two schools in a divided White and Pakistani community due to budget cuts, exploring "the turbulent school experience, covering the challenges of prejudice and cultural issues in the school environment, as well as the humour, relationships and conflict had by the pupils, teachers and parents." St Catherine's Catholic High School in Halifax is used as the filming location for Ackley Bridge College. The series was later renamed Ackley Bridge.

Following the Manchester Arena bombing, the first episode was re-edited prior to airing as there were scenes showing "a troubled student strap a fake bomb to himself in order to disrupt the merging of a predominantly white and a predominantly Asian school." A spokesperson commented: "In light of the tragic events in Manchester, the first episode of forthcoming drama series Ackley Bridge is being re-edited." Ahead of the first series premiere, additional content from the show was shared on Snapchat for "high school age characters to tell their stories in the way young people are" to introduce the characters. Further episodes will "be subsidised with additional videos that will help build the world outside of the allocated TV broadcast."

The first series aired from 7 June to 12 July 2017, and Ackley Bridge was renewed by Channel 4 for a second series consisting of 12 episodes. Following the broadcast of an eight-part third series, Ackley Bridge was again renewed by Channel 4, with the fourth series initially set to premiere in September 2020. Due to the impact of the COVID-19 pandemic on television, production was postponed. This meant that the premiere of the series was postponed to April 2021. It was later confirmed that the first episode would premiere on Channel 4 at 19 April 2021 with a revised timeslot of 6:00 p.m.; the following nine episodes were released afterwards as a boxset on All 4. Another of the changes made to the series included the runtime, which was halved from 60 minutes to 30 minutes. Rebecca Holdsworth, Channel 4's commissioning executive, stated that the shortened runtime was to reflect the viewing habits of younger viewers and to give the series "a new look and feel".

On 17 June 2021, it was announced in a report by Production Weekly that production on the fifth series of Ackley Bridge had commenced that week. The series premiered on All 4 on 11 July 2022. In November 2022, Channel 4 announced that they had decided not to renew Ackley Bridge. In a statement, they said: "As a broadcaster, we’re immensely proud of Ackley Bridge, which over the last five series has received praise for the way in which it has tackled real-life situations and issues in an irreverent and insightful way. However, Channel 4 has a responsibility to continuously look for new and innovative ideas and we have made the difficult decision to not greenlight another series."

== Casting ==
The cast, main and supporting, are a mix of experienced and trained actors, as well as street cast actors. Amy-Leigh Hickman plays Nasreen Paracha, daughter of Kaneez Paracha, who is described as a "quieter and tamer" student, as well as "intelligent", but "ballsy." She felt comfortable acting scenes with Poppy Lee Friar, who plays best friend Missy Booth, due to having a friendship in real life. Friar says she loves portraying Missy, who she describes as "sassy, saucy and a survivor." Television newcomers Nazmeen Kauser and Esa Ashraf play Razia and Saleem Paracha, Kaneez's two other children.

Former EastEnders actors Jo Joyner and Paul Nicholls received the parts of married couple Mandy Carter, the headteacher of Ackley Bridge College, and Steve Bell, a PE teacher. Joyner described Mandy as "career driven", who has "worked so hard over the years to get to the level she's at." Joyner added that she likes the fact her character is not interested in having children. Adil Ray was cast as school sponsor Sadiq Nawaz, as well as Liz White also joining the series as English teacher Emma Keane. Maariah Hussain and Samuel Bottomley, both students at Yorkshire School of Acting in Bradford, were cast as Alya Nawaz and Jordan Wilson, respectively. Hussain described her character as "super intelligent, fiercely righteous, and a bit of a mean girl", but noted that Alya is as "insecure as any teenage girl". Jordan is billed as an artist that is "badly behaved and not fazed by getting into trouble". Matt Zina, principal of Hussain and Bottomley's acting school, said Ackley Bridge is Hussain's first role, noting her excitement, and he described Bottomley as an "exciting young actor". Cody Ryan got the part of Hayley Booth through an acting workshop at her school, Buttershaw Business and Enterprise College, which was run by Beverley Keogh casting agency. Students from Trinity Academy, North Halifax Grammar School, The Crossley Heath School, and Calderdale College feature in the series.

In the second series, Tony Jayawardena was cast as Rashid Hyatt, a science teacher at Ackley Bridge College, and a love interest of Kaneez. Adam Fielding and Jay Saighal also appear. Megan Parkinson was then cast in the role of Sam Murgatroyd, a love interest for Nasreen. Vicky Entwistle guest-starred in the series as the secret wife of Iqbal, as well as Kimberley Walsh, who appeared as "home-wrecking netball teacher" Claire Butterworth. For the third series, several new cast members were cast, including Phoebe Tuffs-Berry, Zara Salim, Hareet Deol, Rob James-Collier, Charlie Hardwick, and Ty Glaser in regular roles. James Atherton and Natalie Gavin, amongst others, also joined the series in recurring roles.

In December 2019, Ackley Bridge was renewed for a fourth series, and it was announced that the series would face an overhaul, including cast changes. Robyn Cara was cast as Kayla Azfal, a "funny, mixed-race pupil torn between her white mum's family and her traditional Pakistani dad's family", alongside sister Marina Perry, played by Carla Woodcock, who was described by Digital Spy as a "mean girl". Yasmin Al-Khudhairi was cast as Fizza Akhtar, the best friend of Kayla. Ryan Dean was cast in the role of Johnny Cooper, a love interest for both Kayla and Fizza, and it was also confirmed that Connor McIntyre would guest star as Johnny's grandfather. Tahir Randhawa, played by Shobhit Piasa, was also introduced as the nephew of Kaneez. The numerous castings came as a result of numerous cast members leaving following the ending of the third series. For the fifth series, the role of Marina was recast to Megan Morgan. New castings for the series included Adam Little as Kyle Dobson, the younger brother of Marina, and Laila Zaidi as Asma Farooqi, a new "hotshot teacher [who] ruffles some feathers".

== Episodes ==
Series	Episodes	Originally released	
Series	Episodes	First released	Last released
1	6	7 June 2017	12 July 2017
2	12	5 June 2018	21 August 2018
3	8	18 June 2019	6 August 2019
4	10	19 April 2021	
5	10	11 July 2022	

== Reception ==
=== Critical reception ===
Since the series was announced, Ackley Bridge has been compared to the BBC school drama Waterloo Road, with Duncan Lindsay from Metro opining that "Channel 4 have been crying out for a solid drama to fit into the early night slot" and that there has been a lack of a "solid school based drama". The series has also been compared to BBC's other long-running school drama series Grange Hill, as Michael Hogan from The Daily Telegraph stated "it could be described as Grange Hill with a mobile phone and a northern accent." Sam Wollaston from The Guardian wrote that Ackley Bridge is similar to a mixture of Waterloo Road and Shameless, and praised their use of social media in the series. He added that the series represents real-life issues and that cultural differences "aren't denied", while also avoiding the usage of stereotypes. Friar and Ryan received praise from viewers in the fourth episode of series one, where the episode revolved around the Booth sisters dealing with the death of their grandmother, played by Rita May, which leads to Hayley being placed in care. Viewers also praised scenes of Lila Sharif, played by Anneika Rose, coming out as lesbian to her students.

Once again, Friar received praise during the teenage pregnancy storyline in series two, and the portrayal of "supportive female friendships" also received a positive reception. The child abuse storyline in series two involving Jordan (Bottomley) and Cory Wilson (Sam Retford) received praise from media and viewers, who thanked the producers for handling a difficult subject gracefully; Joe Anderton of Digital Spy added that "we can definitely put all the comparisons to Waterloo Road aside". Retford received praise again following Cory's troubled home life, mental illness and poverty being covered, with Digital Spy noting that the Ackley Bridge "has never been one to shy away from serious, real-world issues". In 2019, Nasreen was listed as one of Autostraddle's Favourite Lesbian, Bisexual and Trans TV Characters of 2019, and was described as "groundbreaking". It was noted that representation of Muslims on primetime television is rare, and that "to have a young queer Muslim woman as, essentially, the lead character in an ensemble show" was something to be praised.

The second and third series of Ackley Bridge was acclaimed by critics. The Guardian listed the second series as one of the best series to watch in the week it premiered, describing it as a midpoint between fellow Channel 4 programmes Hollyoaks and Shameless. They expressed their admiration for the series exploring serious issue such as race and religion without "lapsing into preachy worthiness". In a similar article a year later, Sarah Hughes of The Guardian praised the third series for continuing to explore dark moments while also balancing them with light-hearted comedy. Hughes appreciated Ackley Bridge "occasionally breaking out a musical interlude and tackling its teenage love stories with sensitivity and heart". Following the fourth series, Kyann-Sian Williams of NME wrote that Ackley Bridge "has a few lessons to learn" from Waterloo Road. Williams accredited Ackley Bridge with having much more diversity than Waterloo Road and felt that it gave a more representative view of northern life, but felt that Waterloo Road had more engaging drama. Williams proposed that Ackley Bridge's earlier timeslot of 6pm for the fourth series had led to the edge being taken away and a level of naivety being added to the storylines. She also expressed a desire to see more adult-themed plotlines. Despite her criticism, she noted that the series is "worth a watch" and admired that younger viewers had formed a connection to the series. Hello! magazine also wrote that viewers disliked the balance of new characters to old characters in the fourth series, noting that they wanted to see more of the original cast members.

=== Awards and nominations ===
Year	Award	Category	Nominee(s)	Result	Ref.
2017	Asian Media Awards	Best TV Programme	Ackley Bridge	Nominated	
2017	Promax Awards	Best Social or Digital Campaign	Ackley Bridge	Won	
2018	Irish Film & Television Academy Awards	Best Director	Robert Quinn	Nominated	
2018	Irish Film & Television Academy Awards	Best Script	Malcolm Campbell	Nominated	
2018	RTS Yorkshire Awards	Actor	Poppy Lee Friar (Missy Booth)	Won	
2018	RTS Yorkshire Awards	Director	Penny Woolcock	Won	
2018	RTS Yorkshire Awards	Drama	Ackley Bridge	Won	
2018	RTS Yorkshire Awards	Drama & Comedy Production	Ackley Bridge production team	Nominated	
2018	RTS Yorkshire Awards	Music	Tim Phillips	Won	
2018	RTS Yorkshire Awards	Promotion or Commercial Production	Ackley Bridge	Nominated	
2018	RTS Yorkshire Awards	Writer	Ayub Khan-Din	Nominated	
2018	RTS Programme Awards	Drama Series	Ackley Bridge	Nominated	
2018	PinkNews Awards	Drama	Ackley Bridge	Nominated	
2018	TV Choice Awards	Best New Drama	Ackley Bridge	Nominated	
2019	Diva Awards	Storyline of the Year	Ackley Bridge	Nominated	
2019	RTS Yorkshire Awards	Drama	Ackley Bridge	Won	
2019	RTS Yorkshire Awards	Original Digital Content	Ackley Bridge Snapchat stories	Won	
2019	RTS Yorkshire Awards	Use of Music and Sound	Tim Phillips	Nominated	
2019	Asian Media Awards	Best TV Character	Kaneez Paracha (Sunetra Sarker)	Won	
2019	Asian Media Awards	Best TV/Online Show	Ackley Bridge	Nominated	
2019	MIPCOM Diversity TV Excellence Awards	Representation of Race and Ethnicity: Scripted	Ackley Bridge	Nominated	
2020	RTS Programme Awards	Drama Series	Ackley Bridge	Nominated	
2020	RTS Yorkshire Awards	Actor	Amy-Leigh Hickman (Nasreen Paracha)	Won	
2020	RTS Yorkshire Awards	Drama	Ackley Bridge	Nominated	
2020	RTS Yorkshire Awards	Use of Music and Sound	Tim Phillips	Nominated	
2020	RTS Yorkshire Awards	Writer	Ayub Khan-Din	Nominated	
2021	TV Choice Awards	Best Actor	Rob James-Collier (Martin Evershed)	Longlisted	
2021	TV Choice Awards	Best Actress	Jo Joyner (Mandy Carter)	Longlisted	
2021	TV Choice Awards	Best Actress	Sunetra Sarker (Kaneez Paracha)	Longlisted	
2021	TV Choice Awards	Best Drama Series	Ackley Bridge	Longlisted	
2022	Broadcast Awards	Best Soap/Continuing Drama	Ackley Bridge	Nominated	
2023	RTS Yorkshire Awards	Actor	Megan Morgan (Marina Dobson)	Nominated	
2023	RTS Yorkshire Awards	Drama	Ackley Bridge	Nominated	
