= Megan Parkinson =

English actress (born 1996)

Megan Parkinson (born 18 July 1996) is an English actress who has played Alys Karstark in Game of Thrones and Sam Murgatroyd in Ackley Bridge. Parkinson has also appeared in the television films Damilola, Our Loved Boy and To Walk Invisible.

== Filmography ==
Film
Year	Title	Role	Notes
2019	Nancy	Director and writer	Short film

Television
Year	Title	Role	Notes
2016	Holby City	Elli Ellis	Episode: "Children of Men"
2016	Damilola, Our Loved Boy	Leanne	Television film
2016	To Walk Invisible	Martha Brown	Television film
2017–2019	Game of Thrones	Alys Karstark	5 episodes
2017	Strike	Brittany Brockbank	2 episodes
2018	Harlots	Elizabeth	1 episode
2018–2021	Ackley Bridge	Sam Murgatroyd	Main role
2022	Rules of the Game	Gemma Thompson	Main role
