= Tony Jayawardena =

British actor

- Born: Anthony Surath Jayawardena; London, England
- Occupation: Actor
- Years active: 2003–present

Anthony Surath Jayawardena is a British actor, known for his roles as Mr Bhamra in the West End musical Bend It Like Beckham the Musical and for his work with the Royal Shakespeare Company, Shakespeare's Globe and Royal National Theatre. In 2018, he began portraying the role of Rashid Hyatt in the Channel 4 drama Ackley Bridge.

== Career ==
Jayawardena appears on the original cast recording of Bend It Like Beckham the Musical, performing the songs "People Like Us" and "The Engagement: Look At Us Now". He was the original Abdul Kareem in the play The Empress by Tanika Gupta, which tells the story of Queen Victoria's relationship with The Munshi, a young man brought over from India to be her servant in the final 15 years of her life. He played Stephano in the RSC's production of The Tempest, which partnered with Intel and Imaginarium Studios and was the first use of real-time motion-capture technology on stage.

== Filmography ==
Film
| Year | Title | Role | Director |
|---|---|---|---|
| 2004 | Chasing Liberty | White House Guard | Andy Cadiff |
| 2008 | A Bunch of Amateurs | Kevin Patel | Andy Cadiff |
| 2009 | National Theatre Live: All's Well That Ends Well | 2nd Lord Dumaine | Marianne Elliot |
| 2010 | National Theatre Live: London Assurance | Mark Meddle | Nicholas Hytner |
| 2011 | Screwed | Bear | Reg Traviss |
| 2012 | Tower Block | Bear | Ronnie Thompson, Eddie |
| 2013 | Trance | Security Guard | Danny Boyle |
| 2016 | A Street Cat Named Bob | Tony | Roger Spottiswoode |
| 2023 | Doctor Jekyll | Malcolm | Joe Stephenson |

Television
| Year | Program | Role | Episode |
|---|---|---|---|
| 2011 | Kabaddasses | The Marauding Moustache | 1 |
| 2012 | Silent Witness | Younis | 2 episodes |
| 2016 | The Windsors | Sandy | Series 1 |
| 2016 | Holby City | Monty the Python | Series 19, episode 10 |
| 2018 | The Tunnel | Lawrence Taylor | 2 episodes |
| 2018–2022 | Ackley Bridge | Rashid Hyatt | Main role |
| 2020 | The Crown | Sir Sonny Ramphal | 2 episodes |
| 2022 | Avoidance | Keith | |

== Stage ==
| Year | Title | Role | Company |
|---|---|---|---|
| 2009 | England People Very Nice | Various | Royal National Theatre |
| 2009 | Twelfth Night | Fabian | The Royal Shakespeare Company |
| 2009 | All's Well That Ends Well | 2nd Lord Dumaine | Royal National Theatre |
| 2010 | London Assurance | Mark Meddle | Royal National Theatre |
| 2013 | The Empress | Abdul Kareem | Royal Shakespeare Company |
| 2013 | Love N Stuff | Mansoor | Theatre Royal Stratford East |
| 2015 | Bend It Like Beckham the Musical | Mr Bhamra | Phoenix Theatre |
| 2016 | The Invisible Hand | Imam Saleem | Tricycle Theatre |
| 2016 | The Tempest | Stephano | Royal Shakespeare Company |
| 2017 | Twelfth Night | Sir Toby Belch | Shakespeare's Globe |
| 2017 | Lions and Tigers | Subhash Bose / Jyotish Gupta | Sam Wanamaker Playhouse |
| 2017 | Young Marx | Gert “Doc” Schmidt | Bridge Theatre |
| 2019 | Hobson's Choice | Hari Hobson | Royal Exchange Theatre |
| 2021 | East is East | Zahir "George" Khan | Birmingham Repertory Theatre |
| 2024 | Nye | Winston Churchill / Doctor Dain | Royal National Theatre |
| 2024 | Dr. Strangelove | Russian Ambassador Bakov | Noël Coward Theatre |
| 2025 | Acorn Antiques: The Musical | Mr Clifford | Hope Mill Theatre |

== Discography ==
| Year | Album | Role | Label |
|---|---|---|---|
| 2015 | Bend It Like Beckham the Musical | Mr Bhamra | Sony Music Classical |
