= Liz White (actress) =

English actress

- Born: Elizabeth White; Rotherham, South Yorkshire, England
- Education: Liverpool Institute for Performing Arts
- Occupation: Actress
- Years active: 2001–present
- Known for: Life on Mars; Ackley Bridge and The Long Shadow

Elizabeth White is an English actress. She grew up in Plymouth and attended Plymstock School from 1989 until 1994. She is known for portraying roles of Annie Cartwright in the BBC One drama series Life on Mars (2006–2007), and Emma Keane in the Channel 4 school-based drama series Ackley Bridge (2017–2019).

== Television and theatre ==
White's other prominent TV roles were in series 1 of the ITV drama The Fixer, playing Jess Mercer, the sister of John Mercer. She also played Shannon in The Empresses' New Clothes, an episode of Fairy Tales, which were the BBC's modern takes on classic children's stories. In April 2011, she appeared in the BBC adaptation The Crimson Petal and the White.

She featured in the music video for Bush's final single "Inflatable", and appeared in the Hammer Films 2012 adaptation of The Woman in Black as the eponymous woman. In July 2014, White starred as Melissa in episodes 1 and 2 of the original audio drama 'Osiris' by Everybodyelse Productions, and in 2014 as Lizzie Mottershead in BBC One's Our Zoo, a drama series about the man who created Chester Zoo and the effect it had on his family.

On stage, she starred in the lead role of Heavenly Critchfield in Tennessee Williams' Spring Storm at the National Theatre in London in 2010, transferred from The Royal & Derngate Northampton production where it premiered in 2009. In 2011, she appeared in A Woman Killed with Kindness by Thomas Heywood at the Lyttelton at the National Theatre in 2011, where she appeared in 2013 again in a double role in Simon Stephens' play Port. In October 2014, she appeared as Chrysothemis in Electra by Sophocles opposite Kristin Scott Thomas at the Old Vic Theatre in London, which also starred Peter Wight who played her father-in-law in the BBC series Our Zoo.

In 2017, it was announced that White would appear in a revival of Jim Cartwright's play Road at the Royal Court Theatre Later that year, she began appearing in the Channel 4 drama series Ackley Bridge as Emma Keane, a role she portrayed until 2019.

In 2019, White portrayed Joy Davidman at the Chichester Festival Theatre's production of Shadowlands, along with National Youth Theatre actors Hugh Bonneville and Andrew Havill.

== Filmography ==
Year	Title	Role	Notes
2002	Auf Wiedersehen, Pet	Lorraine	2 episodes
2002	Always and Everyone	Mandy	Series 4: Episode 1
2002–2003	Ultimate Force	Beth Dow	3 episodes
2003	Teachers	Eileen	4 episodes
2004	Vera Drake	Pamela Barnes	Film
2004	Blue Murder	Vicki Swift	Episode: "Lonely"
2004	A Thing Called Love	Paula Roberts	All 6 episodes
2004	Ten Minute Movie	1st Girl in Bar	Short film
2005	Nathan Barley	Cashier	Episode: "Pilot"
2005	Angell's Hell	Sarah	Television film
2006	The Street	Eileen Harper	Episode: "The Accident"
2006	Vincent	Laura Morris	Series 2: Episode 2
2006–2007	Life on Mars	Annie Cartwright	All 16 episodes
2008	The Fixer	Jess Mercer	Main role; 6 episodes
2008	Fairy Tales	Shannon	Episode: "The Empress's New Clothes"
2008	Franklyn	Laura	Film
2008	New Town Killers	Alice Kelly	Film
2008	Agatha Christie's Marple: A Pocket Full of Rye	Jennifer Fortescue	Television film
2009	A Short Stay in Switzerland	Sophie	Television film
2010	Garrow's Law	Isabella Jasker	Series 2: Episode 2
2010	Blind Eye	Gillian	Short film
2010	Desire	Kristen	Short film
2011	The Crimson Petal and the White	Caroline	4 episodes
2011	Wild Bill	Roxy	Film
2011	The Send Off	Unnamed	Short film
2012	The Woman in Black	Jennet Humfrye / The Woman in Black	Film
2012	Doctor Who	Alice	Episode: "The Snowmen"
2013	The Paradise	Lucille Ballentine	Series 2: Episode 6
2013	Uwantme2killhim?	Janet (MI5 agent)	Film
2014	From There to Here	Joanne	All 3 episodes
2014	Line of Duty	Jo	2 episodes
2014	Our Zoo	Lizzie Mottershead	All 6 episodes
2014	New Tricks	Julia Kane	Episode: "Romans Ruined"
2014	Pride	Margaret Donovan	Film
2016	Grantchester	Vivian Whitaker	Series 2: Episode 3
2016–2017, 2022, 2026	Call the Midwife	Rhoda Mullucks	6 episodes
2017	The Halcyon	Peggy Taylor	All 8 episodes
2017	Eric, Ernie and Me	Dee Braben	Television film
2017–2019	Ackley Bridge	Emma Keane	Regular role; 19 episodes
2019	Brexit: The Uncivil War	Mary Wakefield	Television film
2019	Moving On	Ali Reda	Series 10: Episode 5
2020	Our Girl	Emma	Series 4: Episode 5
2020	Pavement	Katie	Short film
2021	Unforgotten	Fiona Grayson	Main role; 6 episodes
2021	The Amazing Mr Blunden	Jill Tucker	Television film
2022	The Chelsea Detective	Beth Dalton	Series 1: Episodes 3 and 4
2023	The Long Shadow	PS Meg Winterburn	TV mini-series
2024	Tell Me Everything	Debra	Series 2: 6 episodes
2024	The People Before	Jess	Film
2024	Dalgliesh	Hilary Roberts	2 episodes
2025	On the Sea	Maggie	Film
2026	Agatha Christie's Seven Dials	Emily	Miniseries
2026	The Northumbria Mysteries	DI Rose O’Connell	Detective drama series
