= Poppy Lee Friar =

English actress

- Born: 16 April 1995 (age 31); London, England
- Occupation: Actress
- Years active: 2001–present
- Television: Eve; Ackley Bridge; In My Skin

Poppy Lee Friar (born 16 April 1995) is an English actress born in the Southwark district of London. She has starred in several popular series such as Missy Booth in the Channel 4 drama Ackley Bridge, Lydia in the BBC Three series In My Skin and Eve in the CBBC series Eve. As well as appearing in numerous television roles, she has also appeared in various films and theatre productions. For her work, Friar has received accolades including nominations at the AACTAs and the BAFTAs, as well as winning an RTS Award.

== Career ==
Friar made her television debut in 2001 in Wilhelmina and was featured in several West End theatre productions between 2002 and 2007, including Macbeth at the Gielgud Theatre, Jane Banks in Mary Poppins at the Prince Edward Theatre and Louisa in The Sound of Music at the London Palladium. From 2005 to 2009, Friar voiced the role of June in the British version of the animated series Little Einsteins. In 2008, Friar played Hannah in the BBC television film Dustbin Baby, adapted from Jacqueline Wilson's 2001 novel of the same name. In 2010, she appeared in two ITV programmes; an episode of The Bill playing Kelli Sutton and two episodes of A Touch of Frost as Sophie Moorhead. From 2013 to 2014, Friar appeared in the ITV drama Mr Selfridge as Rosalie Selfridge. Between 2015 and 2017, Friar played the titular role in the CBBC sci-fi series Eve. In 2017, Friar played Mary Pascoe in the film My Cousin Rachel.

In 2017, it was announced that Friar had been cast as series regular Missy Booth in the Channel 4 drama Ackley Bridge, for which she received critical acclaim and received an RTS award in her time on the series. In 2018, she portrayed Jayne Torvill in the ITV television film Torvill & Dean. Also in 2018, she starred in the BBC Three special In My Skin as Lydia. Later that year, it was announced that a full television series had been ordered, with Friar reprising her role as Lydia for two further series. In an episode broadcast on 25 June 2019, Friar's Ackley Bridge character Missy dies in previously unannounced scenes. This was written in response to Friar leaving the series to film In My Skin. After the conclusion of In My Skin, it was announced that she would be starring in BBC Three's 2022 television film Life and Death in the Warehouse. Friar also starred in the upcoming BBC television film My Name is Leon, as well as playing Mayella Ewell in a production of To Kill a Mockingbird, which was on at the Gielgud Theatre in 2022.

== Filmography ==
Film
Year	Title	Role	Notes
2005	Little Einsteins: Our Big Huge Adventure	June	British version
2010	Little Einsteins: Rocket's Firebird Rescue	June	British version
2010	Rainbow Magic: Return to Rainspell Island	Lydia	Voice, anime film
2017	My Cousin Rachel	Mary Pascoe	Feature film
2020	Dogman	Agatha	Short film

Television
Year	Title	Role	Notes
2001	Wilhelmina	Young Irene	1 episode
2002	Helen West	Chelsea	1 episode
2004	Belonging	Lara	Television film
2005–2009	Little Einsteins	June	British version; 67 episodes
2006	Casualty	Bonnie Brown	1 episode
2008	Beautiful People	Imelda	1 episode
2008	Dustbin Baby	Hannah	Television film
2009	Desperate Romantics	Rose La Touche	2 episodes
2010	Dead Gorgeous	Sophie	Main role
2010	The Bill	Kelli Sutton	1 episode
2010	A Touch of Frost	Sophie Moorhead	2 episodes
2012	Doctors	Alice Hill	1 episode
2012	Lake Placid: The Final Chapter	Chloe Giove	Television film
2013–2014	Mr Selfridge	Rosalie Selfridge	Recurring role; 13 episodes
2014	Inspector George Gently	Hannah Hawkes	1 episode
2014–2016	In the Club	Katie	4 episode
2015–2017	Eve	Eve	Lead role; 36 episodes
2015	The Syndicate	Mary Campbell	2 episodes
2017–2019	Ackley Bridge	Missy Booth	Main role; 20 episodes
2018–2021	In My Skin	Lydia	Main role
2018	Torvill & Dean	Jayne Torvill	Television film
2022	Life and Death in the Warehouse	Alys Morgan	Television film
2022	My Name is Leon	Carol	Television film
2024	Domino Day	Geri	6 episodes
2025	Shakespeare & Hathaway: Private Investigators	Roz Shepherd	1 episode
2026	Good Omens	Misty Cameron	1 episode

== Stage ==
Year	Title	Role	Venue	Ref.
2002	Macbeth	Macbeth's Daughter	Gielgud Theatre	
2004	Mary Poppins	Jane Banks	Prince Edward Theatre	
2006	The Sound of Music	Louisa	London Palladium	
2022	To Kill a Mockingbird	Mayella Ewell	Gielgud Theatre	

== Video games ==
Year	Title	Role	Notes
2024	Elden Ring Shadow of the Erdtree	Rellana, Twin Moon Knight	Unused dialogue

== Awards and nominations ==
Year	Award	Category	Work	Result	Ref.
2010	Australian Academy of Cinema and Television Arts	Best Lead Actress in a Television Drama	Dead Gorgeous	Nominated	
2015	British Academy Children's Awards	Best Performer	Eve	Nominated	
2018	Royal Television Society Yorkshire Awards	Best Actor	Ackley Bridge	Won	
