= Sunetra Sarker =

British actress, TV presenter (born 1973)

- Born: 25 June 1973 (age 53); Liverpool, Merseyside, England
- Education: Brunel University London
- Occupation: Actress
- Years active: 1988–present
- Spouses: Nick Corfield (m. 2003; div. 2012) Scott Carey (m. 2018)
- Children: 1
- Relatives: Nares Chandra Sen-Gupta (great-grandfather)

Sunetra Sarker (born 25 June 1973) is a British actress and presenter, known for her roles as Nisha Batra in Brookside, Anji Mittel in No Angels, Zoe Hanna in Casualty, and Kaneez Paracha in Ackley Bridge. In 2014, she took part in the twelfth series of Strictly Come Dancing, partnered with Brendan Cole. Since 2019, she has been a regular participant on Celebrity Gogglebox, partnering with Georgia Taylor, and became a panellist on the lunch time chat show Loose Women in 2021.

== Early life ==
Sarker was born in Liverpool into an Indian Bengali family. Her great-grandfather was the lawyer, novelist and political activist Nares Chandra Sen-Gupta. Her father is a retired doctor, and her mother Bisakha taught Indian classical dance, for which she was awarded an MBE in December 2013.

Sarker has a degree in Information Systems for Business in Europe from Brunel University London.

== Career ==
Sarker has played a wide variety of roles in her career. Her initial success came when she was cast as recurring character Nisha Batra in the Channel 4 soap opera Brookside from 1988 to 1991, before returning as a regular from 2000 until 2003. Sarker also starred in the regional soap opera London Bridge. This was followed by her portrayal of Anji Mittel in No Angels from 2004 to 2006.

Sarker's next notable role was portraying the part of Clare Burns in the BBC drama The Chase, until the show was pulled after its second series. In 2007, Sarker was a contestant on the celebrity cooking series Celebrity MasterChef. Subsequently, Sarker played the role of Dr Zoe Hanna in the BBC medical drama Casualty from December 2007 until May 2016. After her departure was announced, Sarker made a promise to co-star Jamie Davis that she would return for one episode when he decided to leave the programme, a promise she honoured in 2018, appearing in an episode broadcast on 13 January. She later reprised the role for another guest stint, with her return set to air in 2024.

In 2017, she played DCI Jane Burr in the second series of ITV's Safe House. From 2017 to 2022, Sarker starred in the Channel 4 drama series Ackley Bridge as Kaneez Paracha, for which she received the award for Best TV Character at the Asian Media Awards. On 23 July 2021, it was confirmed that Sarker would become a panellist on Loose Women.

=== Strictly Come Dancing ===
In autumn 2014, Sarker competed in the twelfth series of the BBC's Strictly Come Dancing, partnered with New Zealand professional dancer Brendan Cole. In the first week, the couple danced a Tango to "Bad Case of Loving You (Doctor, Doctor)" by Robert Palmer and scored 24. In the second week, they danced a Cha-cha-cha to "Million Dollar Bill" by Whitney Houston and scored 26. In the third week, the couple danced the American Smooth to "The Way You Look Tonight" from the film Swing Time and scored 40, including a 9 from head judge Len Goodman. Because of Sunetra's filming schedule, the routine had to be learned in a single day.

In the fourth week, the couple danced the Salsa to "Turn the Beat Around" by Vicki Sue Robinson and scored 27. In the fifth week, the couple danced the Viennese Waltz to "Anyone Who Had a Heart" by Cilla Black and scored 30. In week six, opening the show, they danced a Jive to "Tainted Love" by Gloria Jones and scored 27. In week seven, they danced a Foxtrot to "All of Me" by John Legend and scored 31. In week eight, at Blackpool, they danced a Samba to "I Don't Feel Like Dancin'" by the Scissor Sisters and scored 30. The couple were voted into the dance-off against Judy Murray and Anton du Beke, but were unanimously saved by the judges. In week nine, they danced a Waltz, to "Last Request" by Paolo Nutini, and again scored 30, placing them in one from last place. The couple was voted into the dance-off with Steve Backshall and Ola Jordan, but were saved by three votes to one from the judges. In week ten, they danced a Rhumba to "The Girl from Ipanema" by Michael Bolton. They were again voted into the dance-off, against Mark Wright and Karen Hauer, but were unanimously voted out by the judges.

== Personal life ==
On 23 February 2017, Sarker and her ancestors were the subject of an episode of Who Do You Think You Are? shown on BBC One in which she traced them to Bengal. She learned about her family's involvement in the struggle for independence in India and one of her ancestors' connection to Gandhi. Travelling next to Bangladesh, she visited her great-grandmother's ancestral village where she discovered the story of how her family were caught up in the Bangladeshi war of independence from Pakistan in 1971.

Sarker married Nick Corfield in 2003 and they have a son, Noah, born in 2005. Sarker and Corfield divorced in 2012. In November 2018, Sarker married Scott Carey, whom she has known since 1991.

== Filmography ==
=== Film ===
Year	Title	Role	Notes
2000	Old Man and the Silence	(unknown)	Short film
2016	Penny from Heaven	Jane	Short film. Also executive producer
2017	Kin	Becky	Short film
2017	You, Me and Him	Carol	
2023	Grey Matter	Psychiatrist	

=== Television ===
Year	Title	Role	Notes
1988–1991, 2000–2003	Brookside	Nisha Batra	Regular role. 155 episodes
1991	Bread	Nurse	Series 7; episode 5
1993	Cracker	Receptionist	Series 1; episode 1: "The Mad Woman in the Attic: Part 1"
1997	Flight	Virinder	Television film
1999	Wing and a Prayer	Sameena Kamal	Series 2; episode 3
1999	London Bridge	Jyoti Solanki	Series 4; episode 23
1999	Cold Feet	Clare	Series 2; episode 5
1999	Starting Out	Karen	Episodes 2, 4 & 5
2000	Playing the Field	Dr. Meera	Series 3; episode 5, & series 4; episode 7
2003	Doctors	Donna Sykes	Series 5; episode 38: "All the Lonely People"
2003	Emmerdale	Priti Chowdry	4 episodes
2003	Eyes Down	Karen	Series 1; episodes 1 & 6: "Holiday Rota" & "The Clairvoyant"
2004	If...	(unknown)	Series 1; episode 2: "If... Things Don't Get Better"
2004	Holby City	Nanda Veer	Series 6; episode 36: "Well Meet Again"
2004	The Smoking Room	Monique	Series 1: episodes 1 & 8; "Doo Di Dum Di Da" & "Happy Birthday"
2004–2006	No Angels	Anji Mittel	Main role. Series 1–3; 26 episodes
2005–2008	Ideal	Sangita	Main role. Series 1, 2 & 4; 9 episodes
2006	New Street Law	Nita Shibani	Series 1; episode 1
2006–2007	The Chase	Clare Burnes	Main role. Series 1 & 2; 20 episodes
2007	Mobile	DI Lorraine Conil	Mini-series; episodes 1–3
2007	Celebrity MasterChef	Herself - Contestant	Series 2; episode 9
2007–2016, 2018, 2024	Casualty	Dr. Zoe Hanna	Main role. 11 series; 339 episodes. Also director on 2 episodes & producer on 2 more
2012	Doctor Who	Indira	Series 7; episode 2: "Dinosaurs on a Spaceship"
2014	Puppy Love	Lilli Kusiak	Episodes 4 & 6
2014	Strictly Come Dancing	Herself - Contestant	Series 12; episodes 1–21
2017	Death in Paradise	Hema Patel	Series 6; episodes 5 & 6: "A Man Overboard: Parts 1 & 2"
2017	Broadchurch	Sahana Harrison	Series 3; episodes 1, 5 & 6
2017	Safe House	DCI Jane Burr	Series 2; episodes 1–4
2017	Who Do You Think You Are?	Herself	Series 13; episode 9
2017–2022	Ackley Bridge	Kaneez Paracha	Main role. Series 1–5; 45 episodes. Also associate producer on 20 episodes
2018	Informer	Sadia Shar	Main role. Episodes 1–6
2019	Glow Up: Britain's Next Make-Up Star	Herself - Brandon's Model	Series 1; episode 4: "Red Carpet"
2019	Celebrity Gogglebox	Herself	Main cast; with Georgia Taylor. Series 1; episodes 2, 4 & 6
2020	Cold Feet	Deborah	Series 9; episodes 2–5
2021	The Bay	Stella Bradwell	Series 2; episodes 1–6
2021–present	Loose Women	Herself	Regular panellist
2022	Cockney and Scouse	Ella Walker	Episodes 6–10
2022	Desperate Measures	Varisha	Episodes 1–4
2022	Sherwood	Sheriff of Nottingham	Series 1; episode 1
2023	Eurovision Welcomes the World	Herself - Co-presenter	Television Special; with Rylan
2023	The Lovers	Nisha Anand	Episode 2
2023	Breeders	Meena	Series 4; episodes 2, 8 & 10
2024	G'wed	Amal	Series 1; episode 2: "Cutthroat Mo"
2024	The Responder	Gail	Series 2; episode 4
2024–present	Professor T.	DCI Maiya Goswami	Series 3; episodes 4–6, & series 4; episodes 1–6
2025	Playing Nice	Anika Chowdhury	Mini-series; episodes 2–4
2025	Countdown	Herself - Dictionary Corner	Series 89 & 91; 10 episodes
2025	Silent Witness	Fiona Mason	Series 28; episode 8: "Vanishing Point: Part 2"
2025	The Game	Alice Miller	Mini-series; episodes 1–4
2025	Man vs. Baby	Georgia Hakopian	Episodes 2–4
2026	The Hairdresser Mysteries	Wincey Evans	

== Awards and nominations ==
Year	Award	Category	Work	Result	Ref.
2001	TV Quick Awards	Best New Actor/Actress	Brookside	Nominated	
2013	18th National Television Awards	Drama Performance: Female	Casualty	Nominated	
2014	19th National Television Awards	Drama Performance	Casualty	Nominated	
2016	Inside Soap Awards	Best Drama Star	Casualty	Nominated	
2019	Asian Media Awards	Best TV Character	Ackley Bridge	Won	
