= Bad Genius =

Bad Genius may refer to:

- Bad Genius (2017 film), a 2017 Thai film directed by Nattawut Poonpiriya
- Bad Genius (Thai TV series), a 2020 Thai television series
- Bad Genius (2024 film), a 2024 American film directed by J.C. Lee
- Bad Genius (Philippine TV series), a 2025 Philippine TV series

== See also ==
- Farrey, a 2023 Indian adaptation of the 2017 film
