= West Mulholland =

American actor

- Occupation: Actor
- Years active: 2017–present

West Mulholland is an American actor. He is best known for playing the antagonist Ryan in the horror film Presence.

== Early life ==
Mulholland is from San Clemente, California. He attended Orange County School of the Arts in Santa Ana. He currently attends Stanford University where he does American studies. His back up plan if his acting career didn't take off would be either a lifeguard or an undercover cop. He is of Japanese descent.

== Career ==
Mulholland's first TV appearance was in one episode of the sitcom Fresh Off the Boat while his first full-length film was Dark Harvest. Mulhollands breakout roles was as Axel in the drama series Animal Kingdom. Mulholland starred alongside Lucy Liu and Callina Liang in the horror film Presence. He plays Colin Michael in the FIPRESCI award winning film, The Color of The Sun, which premiered at the 83rd Venice International Film Festival. Recently, it was announced that Mulholland will star as Oliver Belmont in the Amazon MGM adaptation of Elsie Silver's Rose Hill series. He has two forthcoming projects: And Out Comes the Wolf and AngeloPizzo's Bloomington

== Personal life ==
Mulholland loves surfing in his free time as well as reading books. His favorite books are The Hunger Games. He is a big fan of punk rock, naming The Clash and Rancid as his favorite bands. He has named No Doubt as his favorite recording artist.

== Filmography ==
=== Film ===
Year	Title	Role	Notes
2023	A Great Divide	Hunter Drake	
2023	Dark Harvest	Mitch Crenshaw	
2024	Presence	Ryan	
2026	The Color of the Sun	Colin Michaels	

=== Television ===
Year	Title	Role	Notes
2018	Fresh Off the Boat	Stripes	Episode: "The Car Wash"
2019	Legion	Blue	2 episodes
2020	Sydney to the Max	Jimmy Mason	Episode: "Girls II Women"
2020	Little Fires Everywhere	Chain Wallet	Episode: "Picture Perfect"
2021	Animal Kingdom	Axel	3 episodes
2027	Rose Hill	Oliver Belmont	Series Regular
