= Carla Woodcock =

English actress

- Born: 4 October 1998 (age 27); Wheldrake, York, England
- Education: Stagecoach Theatre Arts
- Occupation: Actress
- Years active: 2017–present
- Television: Free Rein; Ackley Bridge

Carla Woodcock (born 4 October 1998) is an English actress. She starred as Susie Garrett on the Netflix series Free Rein (2017–2019), after which she was cast as Marina Perry in the fourth series of the Channel 4 series Ackley Bridge (2021). She has since starred in Tell Me Everything (2022), Such Brave Girls (2023-2025) and A Good Girl's Guide to Murder (2024–2026), as well as Outlander (2026).

== Early life ==
Woodcock was born on 4 October 1998 in Wheldrake, York. While she was young, she began taking lessons in horseriding, but stopped when she began studying acting. At the age of eleven, she began studying at Stagecoach Theatre Arts in York. When she was thirteen, she began attending acting classes with a teacher from the London Academy of Music and Dramatic Art (LAMDA). While training, Woodcock was noted for her "star quality" and it has been stated that she achieved distinctions in each LAMDA grade. She then studied acting at York College in 2015.

== Career ==
In 2016, Woodcock was cast in the Netflix drama series Free Rein as Susie Garrett. The series made its debut in 2017, and she portrayed Susie in all three series, as well as the two feature-length specials. At the beginning of the series, Woodcock describes her character Susie as "a bit of pushover who lives in the shadow of her best friend", but notes that by the conclusion of Free Rein, Susie is a "strong, confident young woman". After the first series of Free Rein, Woodcock appeared in two episodes of the ITV soap opera Emmerdale as Lilly.

In 2019, Woodcock appeared in two episodes of the CW science fiction series Pandora as Sarika Larson, alongside Free Rein co-star Martin Bobb-Semple. On appearing in Pandora, Woodcock stated that she does not "have much experience with the Sci-Fi genre", noting that "it was fun and interesting to be submerged in another world for a couple of weeks".

In August 2020, it was announced that Woodcock had joined the cast of the Channel 4 school drama series Ackley Bridge as "mean girl" Marina Perry. In November 2021, she appeared in the Sky Cinema film The Colour Room. In 2022, Woodcock had roles in the ITV2 teen drama series Tell Me Everything as Zia and the Lifetime prequel miniseries Flowers in the Attic: The Origin.

In 2022, Woodcock was cast alongside Callum Kerr in the pilot of a Hulu adaptation of Richard Mason's History of a Pleasure Seeker, but it was not picked up for series. A year later, she appeared in a recurring role in the BBC Three comedy series Such Brave Girls. Following that, she appeared in BBC Three's A Good Girl's Guide to Murder. She is also set to star in the eighth and final series of the Starz series Outlander as Amaranthus Grey.

She will play the main character, Willa Harba, in the upcoming killer shark horror film White

== Filmography ==
Year	Title	Role	Notes
2017	Emmerdale	Lilly	Guest role
2017–2019	Free Rein	Susie Garrett	Main role
2018	Free Rein: The Twelve Neighs of Christmas	Susie Garrett	Television films
2019	Free Rein: Valentine's Day	Susie Garrett	Television films
2019	Pandora	Sarika Larson	2 episodes
2021	Ackley Bridge	Marina Perry	Main role
2021	The Colour Room	Mabel	Film
2022	Flowers in the Attic: The Origin	Helen	Mini-series; 1 episode
2022	Tell Me Everything	Zia	Main role
2022	History of a Pleasure Seeker	Constance	Pilot
2023–present	Such Brave Girls	Bianca	Recurring role
2024–present	A Good Girl's Guide to Murder	Becca Bell	Recurring role
2026	Outlander	Amaranthus Grey	Main role
2026	Ann Droid	Melody	1 episode
