= Quincy Isaiah =

American actor and football player (born 1996)

- Born: Quincy Isaiah Crosby; September 12, 1996 (age 30); Muskegon, Michigan, U.S.
- Occupation: actor
- Years active: 2018–present
- Known for: lead role of Magic Johnson in Winning Time: The Rise of the Lakers Dynasty
- Football career

Kalamazoo Hornets
- Position: Offensive lineman

Personal information
- Listed height: 6 ft 3 in (1.91 m)
- Listed weight: 258 lb (117 kg)

Career information
- High school: Muskegon
- College: Kalamazoo College (2013–2017)

Quincy Isaiah Crosby (born September 12, 1996) is an American actor and former American football player. He is known for his leading role as Magic Johnson in HBO's sports drama television series Winning Time: The Rise of the Lakers Dynasty.

== Early life ==
Isaiah was born in Muskegon, Michigan, and started playing football at the local Muskegon High School. He went on to play as an offensive lineman for the Division III Kalamazoo College football team. Prior to his graduation in 2017, he starred in two stage plays during his senior year.

== Filmography ==
Key
†	Denotes films that have not yet been released

=== Film ===
Year	Title	Role	Notes
2026	The Fix	Clay	
2027	John Rambo †		Post-production

=== Television ===
Year	Title	Role	Notes
2023	A Black Lady Sketch Show	Tyree	1 episode
2022-2023	Winning Time: The Rise of the Lakers Dynasty	Magic Johnson	Main role, 17 episodes
2026	Nemesis	Gideon "Deon" Davis	Recurring role, 5 episodes
TBA	Myron Bolitar †	Rodney Keys	Recurring role, upcoming series
