= Myron Bolitar (TV series) =

Upcoming American thriller series

- Genre: Thriller
- Created by: David E. Kelley
- Based on: Myron Bolitar by Harlan Coben
- Showrunners: David E. Kelley; Kyle Long
- Starring: Colin Woodell; KJ Apa; Diane Guerrero; Chloe Fineman; Jabari Banks; Jamie McShane; Ra'Mya Latiah Aikens
- Country of origin: United States
- Original language: English

Production
- Executive producers: David E. Kelley; Kyle Long; Matthew Tinker; Harlan Coben; Rick Muirragui
- Production companies: David E. Kelley Productions; Final Twist Productions

Original release
- Network: Netflix

Myron Bolitar is an upcoming thriller television series. It is based on the Myron Bolitar book series written by Harlan Coben.

== Premise ==
A former basketball player pivots to a career of being a sports agent, a job that often finds him putting himself at risk for his clients.

== Cast ==
=== Main ===
- Colin Woodell as Myron Bolitar
- KJ Apa as Win Lockwood
- Diane Guerrero as Esperanza Diaz
- Chloe Fineman as Parker Quinn
- Jabari Banks as Dwayne Richmond
- Jamie McShane as Ray Dimonte
- Ra'Mya Latiah Aikens as Wanda Green

=== Recurring ===
- Ben McKenzie as Gavin Pierce
- Isaiah Hill as Jayden Elder
- Amanda Warren as Deanna Richmond
- Quincy Isaiah as Rodney Keys
- Bebe Neuwirth as Ellen Bolitar
- Griffin Dunne as Alan Bolitar
- Melissa Benoist as Valerie Simpson
- Charlie Tahan as Roger Quincy
- Jamie Hector as Avery Crowder
- Sandrine Holt as Sharon Steele
- Tyler Posey

== Production ==
=== Development ===
It was announced in March 2025 that a series based on the Myron Bolitar book series was in development at Netflix. David E. Kelley was set to team with Bolitar's author Harlan Coben to write the series and executive produce. The series would be given the greenlight in May 2026, with Kelley and Kyle Long serving as showrunners.

=== Casting ===
In July 2026, Colin Woodell was cast as the titular Bolitar, with KJ Apa, Diane Guerrero, Chloe Fineman, Jabari Banks, Jamie McShane and Ra'Mya Latiah Aikens also cast in leading roles. Ben McKenzie, Quincy Isaiah, Bebe Neuwirth, Griffin Dunne and Melissa Benoist would be among several actors cast in recurring roles. In November, Tyler Posey was cast in a three episode guest role.

=== Filming ===
Filming began in New York City in July 2026. Production will also take place in New Jersey.
