= Jae Suh Park =

Korean-American actress (born 1984)

- Born: April 5, 1984 (age 42)
- Occupation: Actor
- Years active: 2000–present
- Spouse: Randall Park (m. 2008)
- Children: 1

Korean name
- Hangul: 박재서
- RR: Bak Jaeseo
- MR: Pak Chaesŏ

Jae Suh Park (Korean: 박재서; born April 5, 1984) is an American actress who starred in the 2017 Netflix comedy series Friends from College.

== Personal life ==
Park grew up in Lodi, California.

She is married to Randall Park, and they have one daughter. They live in the San Fernando Valley.

== Filmography ==
=== Film ===
Year	Title	Role	Notes
2015	The Big Short	Michael Burry's Wife	
2020	The Paper Tigers	Caryn	
2023	A Great Divide	Jenna Lee	

=== Television ===
Year	Title	Role	Notes
2004	ER	Mary Tan	1 episode
2008	How I Met Your Mother	Crystal	1 episode
2011	The League	Grace	1 episode
2013	The Mindy Project	Anna	2 episodes
2015–16	Adam Ruins Everything	Maya Cho	2 episodes
2017–19	Friends from College	Marianne	Main cast; 16 episodes
2020, 2023	Never Have I Ever	Joyce Wong	Recurring cast; 3 episodes
