= Tell Me Everything (TV series) =

British television series

- Genre: Teen drama
- Created by: Mark O'Sullivan
- Written by: Mark O'Sullivan; Robert Fraser
- Directed by: Richard Senior; Marley Morrison
- Starring: Eden H Davies; Spike Fearn; Lauryn Ajufo; Callina Liang; Tessa Lucille; Carla Woodcock
- Narrated by: Eden H Davies
- Composer: Toydrum
- Country of origin: United Kingdom
- Original language: English
- No. of series: 2
- No. of episodes: 12

Production
- Executive producers: Robert Wulff-Cochrane; Camilla Campbell
- Producer: Scott Bassett
- Production location: Welwyn Garden City
- Production companies: Noho Film and Television

Original release
- Network: ITVX; ITV2
- Release: 8 December 2022 – 11 July 2024

Tell Me Everything is a British teen drama television series, created and co-written by Mark O'Sullivan. It premiered on 8 December 2022 on ITVX, as part of the inaugural slate of programming on the new streaming service, and was broadcast linearly on ITV2 from 6 June 2023.

The series was announced on 5 August 2021 when filming had commenced in Welwyn Garden City. The series is ITV2's first original drama in over ten years and has been compared to E4 teen drama Skins (2007–2013). Tell Me Everything initially centres on Jonny (Eden H Davies), whose mental health problems come into greater focus following a family tragedy, but also stars Spike Fearn, Lauryn Ajufo, Callina Liang, Tessa Lucille and Carla Woodcock as part of a greater ensemble; the production team stated that during the casting process, they focused on casting young and rising actors.

A second series was commissioned and filmed over mid-to-late 2023 which premiered on ITVX and ITV2 on 6 June 2024.

On 22 January 2025, ITV announced that the teen drama had been cancelled.

== Premise ==
Tell Me Everything centres around 16-year-old Jonny (Eden H Davies), whose ongoing battles with his mental health are exacerbated after his father dies. A new girl at school called Mei (Callina Liang) pretends her dad has died too and gets into a sexual relationship with Jonny, pushing him to extreme behaviour he might not have engaged in on his own. Jonny's best friends Louis (Spike Fearn) and Neve (Lauryn Ajufo) don't realise how depressed he is as they are undergoing their own difficulties in entering college, and meeting students Regan (Tessa Lucille) and Zia (Carla Woodcock).

ITV said Tell Me Everything explores "the stresses of mental health for today’s teens created by the omnipresence of technology and social media, whilst they are still searching for their own identity, exploring sexuality, and experimenting with relationships, drink, drugs and sex".

== Cast ==
=== Main ===
- Eden H Davies as Jonny Murphy, a 16-year-old who appears confident and carefree on the surface but is hiding a battle with depression.
- Spike Fearn as Louis Green, a 17-year-old long-term friend of Jonny and Neve, with underdeveloped social skills and parents who, although wealthy, are distant and not very helpful to him in terms of advice.
- Lauryn Ajufo as Neve (Nifemi) (series 1), a long-term friend of Louis and Jonny, who hides an attraction to Jonny and her envy at her sister's academic prowess.
- Callina Liang as Mei (series 1), an angry Chinese-Canadian girl whose family moves to Welwyn Garden City in late summer. Her parents are separated and she has recently found out her dad is not her biological father.
- Tessa Lucille as Regan Cullen (series 1), a student at the local college who is a lesbian and hiding her role as a carer for her grandmother.
- Carla Woodcock as Zia (series 1), a student at the local college who is also a social media influencer.
- Nethra Tilakumara as Naisha Jadu (series 2)
- George Hawkins as Dylan (series 2)
- Sophie Ablett as Ella Blake (series 2)
- Daisy Jacob as Rebecca "Bex" Keaton (series 2)
- Levi Mattey as Josh Ridley (series 2)
- Ammar Duffus as Luke (series 2)
- Dylan Brady as Tommy (series 2)

=== Recurring and notable ===
- Aidan McArdle as John (series 1), Jonny's father and landlord of his pub, The Angel; he was the only person to have been aware of Jonny's mental health problems.
- Clare Calbraith as Ann, Jonny and Andrew's mother, who struggles in the aftermath of her husband's death to balance both working as a nurse and at the pub.
- Mark Quartley as Andrew, Jonny's older and more uptight and easily-irritated brother, who begins to adopt a fatherly attitude towards him.
- Nigel Harman as Gareth (series 1), Louis' stepfather, who has made an insufficient effort to get to know his new stepson.
- Sobowale Antonio Bamgbose as Ademola (series 1), Neve's father, who is unaware of the pressure he puts on her.
- Efé Agwele as Timmi (series 1), Neve's more academically successful and gifted sister, but whose personal life betrays her "perfect" persona their parents brag about.
- Momo Yeung as Jing (series 1), Mei's mother, who struggles to understand her daughter in light of their tumultuous relocation.
- Dan Li as Shen (series 1), the distant stepfather of Mei.
- Christopher Goh as Lim (series 1), the biological father of Mei, who has a family of his own and wants no relationship with her.
- Anthony J. Abraham as Marcus (series 1), a potential love interest for Neve.
- Dario Coates as "Pineapples", the local drug dealer.
- Emily Lloyd-Saini as Lorna (series 1), the form tutor of the main characters at the sixth form college.
- Mark O'Sullivan as Mr. Horrocks (series 1), a Media Studies teacher and temporary student counsellor at the sixth form college.
- Bobby Lockwood as Brett (series 1), whose interactions with Mei result in violence.
- Anna Mawn as Sarah (series 1), an employee at the Polish grocery store who briefly liaises with Louis.
- Paola Dionisotti as Susan (series 1), Regan's grandmother.
- Juliette Alexandra as Jaz (series 1), the new carer of Regan's grandmother.
- Ethan Roberts as Kyle (series 1), a colleague of Louis' at the leisure centre who becomes attracted to him.
- Liz White as Debra (series 2), Ella's mother, who has been engaged multiple times in the past and is worried that Ella will ruin her current relationship with millionaire Cyrus.
- Ramon Tikaram as Cyrus (series 2), Debra's millionaire fiancé who tries to connect with Ella.
- Laila Rouass as Samira (series 2), Naisha's mother.
- Nicola Achilleas as Dr. Lawrence (series 2)
- Maria Almeida as Peaches (series 2)
- Carmel Laniado as Darcey-Mae (series 2)

== Episodes ==
=== Series 1 (2022) ===
No.	Title (Note: While the episodes were not given titles in the United Kingdom, the show's German broadcaster did do so. Translated to English, they are, respectively: "Everything is Okay", "Sleep", "Growing Up", "The Real Me", "Future" and "Therapy".)	Directed by	Written by	ITVX release date	ITV2 airdate
1	"Episode 1"	Richard Senior	Mark O'Sullivan	8 December 2022	6 June 2023
Jonny Murphy is about to start sixth form with his best mates Neve and Louis, who decide to have 'one last night of freedom' by paying their usual visit to the funfair that takes place on the last weekend of summer every year. Jonny returns home to find his father being stretchered into an ambulance, and he later dies. Attempting to cope with grieving his father on top of secretly trying to get through a recent, bad, onset of depression, Jonny's behaviour soon grows erratic and unpredictable - his artifice of never being anything but 'OK' and 'fine' crumbling - as he is rejected by a girl he has grown attracted to, and is pressed by his best friends on why he lied to them about why he wasn't around over summer. A mysterious girl called Mei gravitates towards Jonny, who tries to bond with him over a shared bond of both having no dad... except she is being dangerously disingenuous.
2	"Episode 2"	Richard Senior	Mark O'Sullivan	8 December 2022	7 June 2023
Jonny struggles on how to deal with Mei's presence in his life, believing she might tell Neve and Louis that he had been standing on the church tower contemplating jumping. An a poorly-attended party at Louis' house The friends flee to a club where Mei breaks a bottle and holds it to a man's neck when he threatens Jonny, so Jonny decides she is worth trusting. However, Mei's decision to steal Neve's phone in order to get her in trouble with her drug dealer drives a knife through the friendship group, with Jonny irritated at the accusations being levelled towards Mei, but Neve suspecting her. Me Is angry and hurt when she finds her biological father lives nearby but wants nothing to do with her.
3	"Episode 3"	Richard Senior	Mark O'Sullivan	8 December 2022	13 June 2023
Louis is feeling desperate that, approaching his 17th birthday, he is yet to lose his virginity, and - making it his mission to do so with Zia - heeds Jonny's misguided advice to prepare by watching and emulating porn - with catastrophic results. Jonny's relationship with Mei is blossoming quickly, and is too clouded with his need to keep her for his own happiness that he ignores the red flags that Neve attempts to warn him about, she unable to shake accusations of being envious of their relationship as a date with someone else goes awry. Mei's decision to hold a lock-in at the Murphys' pub for Louis' birthday becomes more raucous than expected - her taking revenge on Jonny's inhospitable family - and Jonny learning from a forthright Louis that he has been neglectful to his true self for as long as they've been friends ends his high and sends him down a dark spiral.
4	"Episode 4"	Marley Morrison	Yemi Oyefuwa, Robert Fraser	8 December 2022	14 June 2023
A displeased Neve protests the arrival of her older sister, Timmi, in order to keep her in check, and is ecstatic when she learns something about Timmi she would rather keep quiet. Revelling in getting one over on her, Neve rebels by playing truant with Jonny and Louis; stoned, Louis ends up hooking up, Neve is confronted over what she may be doing to her future, and Jonny avoids telling Mei exactly why he's spurning her. A rave sees a sober Louis realise he disapproves of the new iteration of himself, as Jonny - who has lost track of the number of his - descends into a cloud of despair; letting Neve take the rap for drug possession - which prompts an epiphany about what she really wants for herself - the guilt of his actions causes a public debilitation, as he comes to terms with how alone he has become... and how he doesn't know how to fix that with his current version of himself.
5	"Episode 5"	Marley Morrison	Kat Sadler, Cameron Loxdale, Robert Fraser	8 December 2022	20 June 2023
A careers fair has the ensemble pondering their life plans. Regan's qualms about her role as her grandmother's carer being partially usurped are relieved when she takes their advice and hosts a party that culminates in a mix of euphoria and desolation for everyone. Neve struggles with her attraction to a boy called Marcus, who she finds intimidating, while Louis embarks on a journey exploring his sexuality when colleague Kyle makes a move on him. Mei's encounters with Brett leave her repulsed by his brash and overly forward behaviour. Zia's excitement to intern at a social media company is tempered by the realities of the industry. Jonny's concerted attempts to map out his future hit stumbling blocks, and, after making one last attempt to keep his pain a secret, makes a new plan for his future that revolves around feeling he has none, that it has been ripped away.
6	"Episode 6"	Marley Morrison	Mark O'Sullivan, Robert Fraser	8 December 2022	21 June 2023
Jonny begins his road to recovery, but cannot shake the feeling that Welwyn Garden City has nothing left for him; learning Mei has come to the same conclusion, discovering the extent to her public humiliation, he jumps at the chance to venture off to Canada with her. Yet a disturbing family revelation sees Jonny realise that his life is not predestined, and alters his entire outlook on attempting to improve his health - that he cannot get better without others doing the same. Zia's frank confession about her previous mental health battles, after the wellness day she's organised goes off-script, leaves Louis with conflicting feelings, unsure how to balance an attraction towards her and Kyle. Neve asserts to Marcus that she isn't willing to change her personality for him, and Regan resolves the tensions between her and Jaz. The entire group converge on a bonfire party - where candidness is subtly celebrated, yet still some remains held back - where someone out for revenge is lurking in the bushes, egged on by invisible forces.

=== Series 2 (2024) ===
The second series will feature the character of Jonny, and his family, moving to a new town of, and college in, Hitchin. None of the ensemble cast return, apart from a brief appearance of Louis (Spike Fearn) on faulty wi-Fi who is out of the country with his mother. A new cast is introduced: Naisha (Nethra Tilakumara) who pretends her "newly single" status doesn't bother her; care-leaver Dylan (George Hawkins) and his boyfriend Tommy (Dylan Brady); Ella (Sophie Ablett) who is "often putting herself in dangerous situations"; and also-recently-moved-to-the-town Bex (Daisy Jacob).

No. overall	No. in series	Title	Directed by	Written by	ITVX release date	ITV2 airdate
7	1	TBA	Unknown	Unknown	6 June 2024	6 June 2024
With both Jonny and Bex starting at their new colleges on the same day, the two connect at the bowling centre where Bex works. Dylan is less-than-impressed with Naisha's getting between him and his boyfriend, while Ella finds out a video was made of her giving a guy a blowjob and has been shared online.
8	2	TBA	Unknown	Unknown	6 June 2024	13 June 2024
Jonny and Bex hit trouble at the first hurdle. Naisha bears the brunt of pressure simultaneously from parents and technology. Dylan feels pushed out while Josh struggles with Ella's overenthusiasm.
9	3	TBA	Unknown	Unknown	6 June 2024	20 June 2024
Jonny feels his recovery has been destroyed in the face of panic over an exam. Concern grows for Ella, while both Naisha and Bex realise confrontation is needed.
10	4	TBA	Unknown	Unknown	6 June 2024	27 June 2024
Bureaucracy results in a downtrodden Jonny, Ella's troubles are compounded, Naisha becomes aware of Josh's deception, and a family reunion for Dylan proves heavily facile.
11	5	TBA	Unknown	Unknown	6 June 2024	4 July 2024
Jonny distracts himself by jumping headfirst into kickboxing, as Ella impetuously and misguidedly revels in new-found fame. Dylan wars with boyfriend Tommy over some unexpected income, while Josh places a friendship in peril.
12	6	TBA	Unknown	Unknown	6 June 2024	11 July 2024
Jonny attempts to re-establish his relationship with Bex, unaware of what might come to the surface. Ella is determined to find the person behind her public shaming. Josh stuns Naisha after she musters the courage to divulge what she thinks of him.

== Production ==
=== Development ===
Plans for Tell Me Everything were finalised in May 2021 and the press release for the series was launched on 5 August 2021. At the time of release, ITV confirmed that filming was in place in Welwyn Garden City, Hertfordshire, where the events within the series will also be set; the town is series creator Mark O'Sullivan's hometown. The executive producers for the series are Robert Wulff-Cochrane and Camilla Campbell, who commissioned the E4 teen drama Skins. The series is written by creator O'Sullivan, Yemi Oyefuwa, Kat Sadler and Cameron Loxdale, and is directed by Richard Senior and Marley Morrison. It was confirmed that the series would be produced by Noho Film and Television and ITV Studios, and that it would be co-funded by Young Audiences Content Fund, a UK government funded grant scheme focused on creating programmes for British adolescents.

"We didn't want to create a series that feels bleak. It delves into serious issues, but there's always a way out, there's optimism woven through. At the heart of all good teen drama is the search for identity."

— Camilla Campbell, executive producer.

Writer O'Sullivan worked with Noho while developing the show so as "to ensure that it comes from a perspective that speaks to the teens of the 2020s", such as by interviewing sixth form students at his former school in Welwyn Garden City so "the show felt authentic and representative"; he also received inspiration from his children and their friends, and that "some of [his] favourite lines have come from them". Executive producer Wulff-Cochrane said that "[a] lot of the series is informed by the issues they raised and, in some cases, some of the specificities they shared with us". Heather Fallon of Broadcast commented that the "subject of mental health is at the very heart of Tell Me Everything, which weaves O'Sullivan's own experience of adolescent grief and depression with the frequent references that were made in the teen discussion groups". As well as such contribution, Noho "opened up the writers' room to create an ensemble of young voices, to further add to the authenticity of the series and give budding writers an opportunity." Executive producer Campbell added that Noho "also sought out insights from the mental health charity Mind, as well as working closely with the BFI, which supported the drama via the Young Audiences Content Fund".

The depiction of mental health, combined with the implementation of comedy, was something Campbell commented was their "biggest creative challenge", on the difficulty of balancing it right; O'Sullivan said including humour was a key part of the series, as he had "always needed to search out the shards of light among the darkness, for my own sanity as much as anything else. My humour always tends towards the darker, edgier places." He explained that writing the show for a young audience meant a focus on how to write for them without "stray[ing] into patronising and condescension", as "[m]ore so than any other audience, teens can sniff out inauthenticity." Campbell commented that the setting of the show was also of significance, such as in their attempts to distinguish Tell Me Everything from other similar content from abroad, in that "[t]hat suburbia is very recognisable for UK teens", and "the whole series has a very British sensibility. It's dark but comic, it has a real sense of place and will speak to a British audience far more than it will a US one." O'Sullivan commented that he was "pleased we decided to set it [in Welwyn Garden City] because I think we all have slightly tricky kind of relationships with the places we grew up, especially if they're the smaller places because they can feel suffocating." Wulff-Cochrane said "part of the joy" of the show is its Welwyn Garden City setting, describing it as an "'everyplace' that represents the quirky oddness of this nation", and that "[w]ith its slightly suburban landscape it felt like a truthful representation of what it feels like to be a teenager in this country. Where fun is just over the horizon, so instead you've got to make your own."

"Creating and writing Tell Me Everything, my first drama, has been an exhilarating, exhausting rollercoaster. To be accurate, it's a drama with comedy, as I've always found it impossible in life not to search for the humour in the darkest, saddest moments. I've cried, laughed, and cringed whilst writing (and filming in some of the actual places where I spent my teenage years – that's quite a weird experience)."

— Mark O'Sullivan, creator and co-writer.

O'Sullivan commented that the character of Jonny was "loosely based" on himself, and that his own story, "which is some of the stuff that Jonny goes through, was the starting point. Some of it is very autobiographical. And some of it isn't. My teenage years were often pretty horrible, for lots of reasons, not least of which was my dad's sudden death." He spoke of how Jonny is "quite typical of a lot of young men. He struggles with his mental health hugely. And I think it's the bottling up and the anger that he feels and it's not really anger, it's just emotion. He doesn't know where to place it. Hopefully people will relate." Emma Saunders, who interviewed O'Sullivan, Davies and Ajufo for BBC News said the drama was "refreshing" in how it "refuses to gloss over the tedium of depression and anxiety, zoning in on the panic attacks, insomnia and self-doubt that are often part of these conditions"; Davies expanded on this, saying "[s]ometimes, when we talk about mental health as a theme, it's in danger of being glamorised... in a way that's appeasing to people" and "[w]hat we did was create something that's ugly and jagged. And that's how it is. Jonny is not always the nicest person and if audiences can see that, maybe it can help them see it in other people and their friends." He said further that "it was hard at times to film stuff of that nature because you have to access a place that's difficult"; on-set therapists were available on set throughout production, and the executive producers reported that they "gave the actors the chance to talk to people afterwards if they felt concerned about anything" and that "[o]n occasion the actors have queried certain things and we have changed the scripts to make sure they feel comfortable with whatever they are doing." The show also utilised an intimacy co-ordinator for certain scenes. The cast met with mental health charity Mind in order to more accurately portray mental health issues in their characters.

Both executive producers spoke of the significance of the diverse cast and writing team for the show, Campbell saying that "[they] were very determined that this show should have a mix of voices that could only enrich and lend more veracity to the characters and the stories we are telling. We were really excited to have Yemi Oyefuwa, Kat Sadler, Cameron Loxdale and Rob Fraser on board who all bring something very different. That was a nonnegotiable part of this process for us", with Wulff-Cochrane expanding on this; "if you are going to look at British teenage life now, these teens are growing up in a much more diverse world than the generation before them. We wanted to be sure that it felt reflective of a broader British society. Again the BFI and ITV were very keen that we made sure it had sexual, gender and racial diversity in its bones."

=== Filming and casting ===
Tell Me Everything employed the strategy of an open casting call advertised over social media, by "seeking a crop of young actors from diverse backgrounds outside of the traditional agent-led casting process during lockdown, with actors invited to submit a self-tape", with over "300 tapes ... pored over for the three lead roles". Those who auditioned "rang[ed] from those from established backgrounds with multiple credits, to beginners with no prior professional experience". Davies, who was 17 when he auditioned and during parts of filming, was using social media as a means to find opportunities for roles, and "secured the role of Jonny with a recording of himself performing a monologue".

The cast met up prior to shooting, the first occasion being a workshop with the show's intimacy coordinator days before filming began, with various activities such as in-character interviews, improvising their characters' backstories and relationships, creating "special character handshakes" and 'animal work', "in which the actor embodies an animal's physicality that best mirrors their character". Liang said this all "broke the ice", and the cast members "quickly became good friends which was amazing because every day on set, it didn't even feel like we were working. It felt like we were just, you know, having fun as friends do but obviously still working." Woodcock praised this type of rehearsal that O'Sullivan and director Richard Senior allowed prior to filming, commenting that "[i]t kind of felt like we were workshopping it, and really playing around with the scenes, which is quite rare these days".

When the series was announced, the stars were billed to be Eden H Davies, Spike Fearn, Lauryn Ajufo, Callina Liang, Tessa Lucille and Carla Woodcock. However, it was stated that the casting was preliminary and that it may be altered during the production process. Executive producers Wulff-Cochrane and Campbell expressed their excitement at the talent of the cast and said that a focal point was put on casting new and rising actors during the casting process. Filming began in August 2021 and continued into the early autumn, mainly in Welwyn Garden City, with one scene in the first episode shot in Letchworth. The first scenes to be shot for the series were set at night, with scenes in the fourth episode, in which Jonny, Louis and Neve are stoned in a grocery store, being improvised.

"Through the narratives on mental health which happen throughout the show, I hope people see how friends can be just as important as family. I hope people will start talking to their friends more – if you have a problem, just speak to them. I think Tell Me Everything does a great job of showing that. Even if it just helps one person feel a little better, I'd be so happy with that. We need to start talking to the people we trust around us, I hope the show helps people do that."

— Spike Fearn, when asked what he hoped viewers would "take away from Tell Me Everything".

Fearn – who initially auditioned for the character of Jonny and was asked to return for the part of Louis - said "a sense of community and support" was important while working on Tell Me Everything, for "anything you do but especially for this show", as they "were making something about young people who are tackling lots of different emotions and going through lots of different things. It was important to have community and support because you want to do the show justice, and you want to make it as real as possible. With that in mind, you want to have people you can talk to, bounce off of, and share experiences with." He said that first reading the scripts, he was drawn to the role by how it allowed him a "chance to do loads of things [he] hadn't ever done before," and "with the experiences Louis goes through, there's so much there that you'll see in the show, and to be the one portraying it is really cool." He went on to say that the topics of mental health and identity, which the show explores, should be "spoken about all the time", as he considers them "the main things we have to talk about and not just within the younger generations," and that the media's role can be mixed in this regard, but certain television programmes "have been a big part of opening up conversations about these topics too" and "think[s] Tell Me Everything is definitely one of them", as well as being a show that works to depict the various aspects and ups-and-downs of teenage years, and that "[c]elebrating adolescence is just as important as showing the dark sides of it, even though those darker moments are great too because they help people open up those harder conversations."

Ajufo described her willingness to take part in the series, saying that she had "always wanted to do a teen drama", growing up watching many American ones, and "so it was a no-brainer that this was something [she'd] be interested in." She detailed how cast members' own experiences with issues and topics that were presented within the series helped them prepare to depict them through their characters – with "a lot of discussions amongst ourselves with the cast and Mark [O'Sullivan,] the writer" - incorporating and "reflect[ing] on scenarios you or someone you know has been in ... into your performance", and how it was "super important for these matters to be seen from the perspective of a teen because self-doubt, trying drugs and drinking mostly start very young therefore it's best to have these discussions now rather than later". Ajufo reported how her character's "story personally means a lot" to her, as "there are many young black women and girls who may feel isolated being the only black person in a predominantly white environment and [her character's] story shows that you shouldn't let that dim your light. That it's a beautiful thing to embrace who you are and where you're from and most definitely something to be proud of." She mentioned working with Zainab Jaye, the show's hair and makeup designer, which entailed "[c]reating different hairstyles and playing with colours [and] was just such a great experience." Ajufo also spoke positively about working with the show's costume designer, through the use of a mood board from the start, and said it was "nice to see it all pieced together and how they've taken the narrative of Tell Me Everything and tried to incorporate it with previous shows and what the trends are today."

"I think when I saw the script, I felt like a TV show hasn't been made like this in a long time. Something that's uniquely British, based in Welwyn Garden City, very down to earth, exploring the themes of teenagers growing up in the 2020s, because a lot of issues that teenagers face now is different to what people used to face before; even after COVID, the use of social media has gone up tremendously. I read the script and I was like, 'This is something really sick because it discusses a lot of raw issues, and also has a lot of light-heartedness throughout'."

— Camilla Liang, when asked what "attracted [her] to the script".

In an interview with 1883, Liang spoke of her experience during filming, and how transitioning from performing on stage to on screen was somewhat difficult; "with stage, you've run through the play the entire way. But with TV, you (for example) need to start crying. And then they cut and it's like you go off and you're having a bagel and chat with the crew and then they set up a camera and say: 'All right, Callina you're on again.' It's kind of hard to adapt to changing emotions quickly. Whether that's extreme emotions or less extreme emotions, they have to be real and believable. It takes a bit of practice and a bit of time, but I think I got the hang of it." Liang said that she auditioned for the role from Toronto - her character initially written as British, and Liang recalled preparing the accent before she was informed the character was being floated as Canadian instead - and was then flown out to London, and was impressed by the "very relevant" script, feeling "like these stories needed to be told". She praised Fearn for his performance as Louis, that "he played him amazingly", complimenting his ability for 'dry humour'. Liang spoke in another interview about the significance, and "symbolic" nature, of the use of make-up for her character; "[w]hen she was at home and the makeup was light, it was like she has her guard down, but every time you saw her out with friends, with Jonny, she always has this really dark makeup and really intense outfits", commenting that "[i]t was something [her] and the make-up team discussed a lot, her wearing her mask".

=== Potential legacy ===
Alex Bushill, Head of Media at mental health charity Mind, said that "[i]t has never been more important for broadcasters to create accurate, authentic, and sensitive storylines about mental health," as their own research had found that "the influence of mental health stories is even stronger among young people, with two in five people aged 18-24 realising they had experience of mental health problems after seeing a soap or drama."

=== Second series ===
It was reported in December 2022 that filming on a second series would begin in April 2023, although in March 2023 this was said to have been delayed until June.

Crews were spotted in Hertfordshire filming the second series in August 2023.

On 27 September 2023, a second series was officially confirmed, for a 2024 release and broadcast on ITV2 and ITVX. It was reported that the series will feature a near-complete cast refresh – with the addition of cast members Nethra Tilakumara as Naisha, George Hawkins as Dylan, Sophie Ablett as Ella and Daisy Jacob as Bex, Levi Mattey as Josh, Ammar Duffus as Luke, and Dylan Brady as Tommy – as Eden H Davies' character of Jonny "move[s] to a new town as he continues his journey of recovery". O'Sullivan returns as a writer for the second series.

== Broadcast and distribution ==
Tell Me Everything was made available in the UK on ITVX at midnight on 8 December 2022. The show was commissioned for ITV2, but was made available prior to linear broadcast on ITVX as part of ITV's new policy to launch most new content on-demand first, with shows' linear broadcast within "six to nine months" of ITVX availability; the series launched on ITV2 on 6 June 2023, following episodes of Love Island.

It was first available internationally, launching on ZDF's on-demand platform, which is available in Germany, Austria and Switzerland, on 18 November 2022, with a linear broadcast of all six episodes back-to-back on the German channel ZDFneo that night. It launched in New Zealand on TVNZ+ on 9 December 2022, and aired weekly in Ireland from 19 December 2022 on Virgin Media More, but was not simultaneously or subsequently made available on the channel's related streaming/on-demand service. It premiered in Spain on HBO Max on 9 February 2023, under the title Confía en mí.

== Reception ==
Emma Loffhagen of The Evening Standard, in a four-star review, called the series "a glorious tribute to smalltown British adolescence". She said that "[d]espite its echoes of Noughties indie sleaze, Tell Me Everything tackles the nuances of late teenagehood with far more sensitivity than the often slightly crass approach of a decade ago", with "a distinctly contemporary feel, exploring the uniquely devastating nuances of teenage depression in the social media age." Comparing it to such dramas, Loffhagen noted the show "manages to retain the charm of these British teen classics while leaving behind the casual sexism and homophobia that make some of them an uncomfortable watch today, incorporating in their place same sex relationships and a diverse cast in a refreshing and natural way." She went further, saying the series is "[b]eautifully shot and perfectly paced", praising the "pitch perfect casting [and] stellar script", with "Davies deliver[ing] a masterclass ... expertly flitting between grief, angst and ecstasy with the skill and honesty of seasoned professional," and that "[w]hile there are a few clumsy moments, Tell Me Everything does an excellent job of tapping into the truisms and sometimes mundanity of the teenage psyche, while also hinging around a genuinely captivating plot."

Alex Moreland's four-star review of the first two episodes for National World also praises Davies' performance, saying that he "rises to the challenge admirably, anchoring complex material and portraying complex emotions with aplomb", as well as Liang being "a magnetic performer". He notes that the other main characters are "all working within recognisable archetypes", but that underlying them are "strong dramatic instincts" that "seems worth watching and waiting to see how they play out". He also notes that Tell Me Everything both delves into, but also represents itself as different to, other dramas in the young adult genre, that "it still revels in the mess, after all, clearly well aware of exactly what people want to see from a show like this and what it has to offer in turn", but also "makes it apparent upfront that it has a greater range that you might assume – and greater self-confidence and self-control than its teenage protagonists, too, switching gears on a dime". He also commends how "[t]he first episode introduces something of a mystery surrounding Johnny [sic]; it goes on to resolve it in a pointedly understated way, a display of subtlety at a point when another show might've gone big or flashy."

Dana Reboe of 1883 held acclaim for the show's "bold writing and dark sense of humo[u]r", calling it a "refreshing take on the stereotypical coming-of-age story we’ve all seen done before", with specific praise for Liang as Mei, it "hard not to be instantly captivated by her performance as Mei from the moment she walks onto screen". Madeline Reid of BRICKS Magazine was also complimentary, saying the show "is an unmistakable outcast" in comparison to other shows of similar ilk – naming Skins particularly – and "depicts an at-times alarmingly accurate account of British late teenagehood that feels timeless, combined with the painful reality of depression in the social media age", which "feels decidedly British, from its slang and dry humour to the hand-held shaky camera work. While there are hints of Noughties indie-sleaze present, the show's contemporary sensitivity to stories spanning mental health, addiction, grief and queer identity cement it as a surprisingly realistic snapshot of life for young people in the 2020s." She went further, saying "[u]ndeniably, the show's cast is its greatest strength. Eden delivers a faultless performance as Jonny in his debut TV role, expertly flitting between grief, angst and ecstasy with ease", and that "[c]ombined, the cast's chemistry is evident, and when paired with witty scriptwriting and unexpected plot twists, the result is equal parts charming and comedic." Reid also commented that it was "refreshing" that the series "refuses to gloss over the tedium of depression and anxiety, zoning in on the panic attacks, insomnia and isolation", and that "[u]nlike Skins, however, I doubt that this series will receive the same complaints for unrealistic depictions of teenage relationships, parties or drug use" as that "unlike its predecessors, there's a distinct difference in how Tell Me Everything treats its teenage characters and their traumas – rather than trying to shock audiences by uncovering the illegal antics of its central characters, the show expresses sympathy and support for its most vulnerable."

Criticism came from controversial writer Julie Burchill, who intimated in Spiked of the series, that it exemplified what she saw as a "growing assumption that everyone has mental-health issues" and that they are being used by teenagers in order to feel like they belong, decrying it as "dramatic actions in order to find their tribe", and those with genuine mental health difficulties are "being lost in the throng of those who only want to belong and be seen". On Twitter, creator and writer O'Sullivan responded mordaciously to her points, saying "Even if nothing else good ever happens, knowing that [the show] has triggered Julie Birchill will always be enough for me. That'll do me."

=== Viewership ===
No indications of the show's performance through ITVX have been reported or published. Upon the show's linear premiere on ITV2 - almost exactly six months since the programme was made available on-demand – the show fared poorly; it garnered 126,000 and 142,000 viewers on the night for the first two episodes. Only the second episode rated highly enough once catch-up outside of on-demand viewership was added to appear in the channel's top 50 programmes of the week, gaining slightly to 143,000. The third episode accrued 139,000 viewers, the fourth fewer than 133,000, the fifth less than 129,000, with the sixth gathering 134,000.
