= Kat Sadler =

English comedian, writer and actress

- Born: 1994 (age 31–32)
- Education: Warwick University
- Occupations: Actress, writer, comedian
- Television: Such Brave Girls (2023–present)

Kat Sadler (born 1994) is a British comedian, actress, and writer. She is best known for writing and starring in the BBC Three comedy drama Such Brave Girls.

== Early life and education ==
Sadler was born in 1994 and is from Sutton, London. Her mother is a personal trainer. Sadler has a younger sister, actress Lizzie Davidson, who also plays her sister in Such Brave Girls. Sadler's family experienced financial struggles whilst she was growing up, and she describes the family environment as "tempestuous".

Sadler studied film and literature at Warwick University. Whilst there, she would write sketches for the comedy society and perform stand-up comedy.

Sadler is her stage name with Davidson being her family name.

Sadler is a frequent collaborator with comedy writer Cameron Loxdale. The pair co-wrote the BBC Radio 4 show Kat Sadler's Screen Time together. Loxdale is also the Script Editor for Such Brave Girls.

== Career ==
In 2019, Sadler was awarded the BBC comedy writing bursary and became the in-house comedy writer for BBC Studios.

Sadler was a writer on The Mash Report and won the BBC Radio Comedy Writers Bursary in 2019. Her writing credits also include Joe Lycett's Got Your Back for Channel 4, The Jonathan Ross Show for ITV, Newsjack for BBC Radio 4 Extra and Frankie Boyle's New World Order for BBC Two, The Now Show and The News Quiz for BBC Radio 4, and Hypothetical and Mel Giedroyc: Unforgivable for Dave.

=== Such Brave Girls ===
At the start of 2020, Sadler had deteriorating mental health, experiences she drew from for the BBC Three and Hulu sitcom Such Brave Girls (2023) which she wrote and starred in alongside her real life sister Lizzie Davidson.

Discussing the 2021 pilot episode, Sadler said that:

"everything we joke about in the show is from a place of lived experience. I wish I could say this is a heart-warming show about overcoming trauma, but that would be a lie. It's about three toxic, damaged egomaniacs manipulating the world and each other for their own personal gain, vengeance and glory…just like in Little Women."

Sadler said that she wanted to create a character like herself – "I'm sort of obsessed with my own trauma, and love telling people...and I wanted to do a more tongue-in-cheek version of that really" She drew on the experience of living at home with her mum and sister when she had to move home during lockdown.

At the start of filming the series in 2023, Sadler described the show as "a family sitcom about trauma, but it's more about us being narcissistic losers who are pathetically obsessed with what people think about us." The BBC described the show as "an unflinching, often absurd, and very funny look at a mother and her two grown up children try to cope with their own emotional and financial fragility, whilst they are living under the same roof; a series not for the faint-hearted, or the easily offended." After the second series was broadcast, a third series was commissioned in May 2026.

== Awards ==
Year	Award	Category	Nominee	Result	Ref.
2024	Chortle Awards	Best TV Show	Such Brave Girls	Nominated	
2024	BAFTA Television Craft Awards	Emerging Talent: Fiction	Kat Sadler	Won	
2024	Royal Television Society Programme Awards	Best Female Comedy Performance	Kat Sadler	Nominated	
2024	Royal Television Society Programme Awards	Best Scripted Comedy	Such Brave Girls	Nominated	
2024	Broadcasting Press Guild Awards	Best Comedy	Such Brave Girls	Nominated	
2024	Broadcasting Press Guild Awards	Best Writer	Kat Sadler	Nominated	
2024	Broadcasting Press Guild Awards	BPG Breakthrough Talent Award	Kat Sadler	Shortlisted	
2024	British Academy Television Awards	Best Scripted Comedy	Such Brave Girls	Won	
2026	Royal Television Society Programme Awards	Best Scripted Comedy	Such Brave Girls	Nominated	
2026	Royal Television Society Programme Awards	Writer - Comedy	Kat Sadler	Won	
2026	BAFTA	Best Comedy Writer	Kat Sadler	Nominated	

Sadler has twice been nominated for the BBC New Comedian of the Year award.

== Personal life ==
Sadler is queer.

Sadler has experience of mental health issues. The idea for Such Brave Girls came out of her experience of calling her sister from hospital and told her she'd been sectioned after twice trying to take her own life, and her sister responded by revealing she was £20,000 in debt, then they both laughed. When the first series came out, Sadler lost her best friend to suicide, which "gave me real fire to talk about it [the mental health system]" She dedicated her Emerging Talent: Fiction BAFTA to her best friend.

== Filmography ==
=== Television ===
Year	Title	Channel	Role	Other Role	Notes	Ref.
2018-2019	The Mash Report	BBC Two		Writer	Series 1, Episode 8; Series 2, Episode 6; Series 3, Episodes 3, 5.	
2019-2020	Frankie Boyle's New World Order	BBC Two		Writer	Series 3, Episode 1, Special; Series 4, Episode 1, Special.	
2020-2021	Hypothetical	U&Dave		Writer (additional material)	Series 2, Episodes 3, 4; Series 3, Episode 2	
2020-2021	The Jonathan Ross Show	ITV1		Writer	Series 16, Episode 7; Series 17, Episodes 2, 3, 4, 8	
2021	Attack Of The Hollywood Clichés!	Netflix		Writer		
2021	Joe Lycett's Got Your Back	Channel 4		Writer (additional material)	Series 3, Episodes 7, 8	
2022	Mel Giedroyc: Unforgivable	U&Dave		Writer (additional material)	Series 2, Episodes 1–8	
2022	Tell Me Everything	ITV2		Co-Writer	Series 1, Episode 5	
2023–present	Such Brave Girls	BBC Three	Josie	Creator, Writer, Executive Producer		

=== Radio ===
Year	Title	Station	Role	Other	Notes	Ref.
2018	BBC New Comedy Award	BBC Radio 4	Herself		Episode 2: "Heat 2 - London"	
2018-2019	The News Quiz	BBC Radio 4		Writer (additional material)	Series 98, Episodes 2, 3, 5, 7; Series 99, Episodes 1–8; Series 100, Episodes 1, 5, 7;	
2018-2019	The News Quiz	BBC Radio 4		Writer	Series 101, Episodes 6, 7	
2019-2021	Newsjack	BBC Radio 4 Extra		Writer	Series 20, Episodes 2, 3, 4, 6 Series 21, Episodes 1, 2, 3, 4, 6 Series 22, Episodes 1, 5; Series 23, Episode 2; Series 24, Episode 4	
2019-2021	Newsjack	BBC Radio 4 Extra		Script Editor	Series 22, Episode 6; Series 23, Episodes 3, 4; Series 24, Episode 3	
2019	Newsjack Unplugged	BBC Radio 4 Extra		Writer	Series 3, Episodes 1–8; Series 4, Episodes 2–8	
2019	The Now Show	BBC Radio 4		Writer (additional material)	Series 54, Episodes 1, 5, 6, 7; Series 55, Episodes 4, 5.	
2019	V.I.P R.I.P	BBC Radio 4		Writer	Episodes 1, 2	
2020	Alex Edelman's Peer Group	BBC Radio 4		Writer (additional material)	Series 3, Episodes 1–4	
2020	Obsessions	BBC Radio 4		Writer (additional material)	Series 2, Episodes 1–4	
2020	Nature Table	BBC Radio 4		Writer	Series 1, Episodes 1–6; Christmas Special; Series 2, Episodes 1–6; Series 3, Episodes 2, 3, 4, 6	
2022, 2025	Kat Sadler's Screen Time	BBC Radio 4	Kat	Writer	Series 1 and 2	
2024	Obsessions	BBC Radio 4	Guest		Series 3, Episode	

=== Online ===
Year	Title	Channel	Role	Other role	Notes	Ref.
2017	Shower Business	YouTube	Business Woman	Writer		
2017	Sad Face	YouTube	Kat	Writer		
2018	10 easy steps to write the perfect tweet	YouTube	Kat	Writer		
2018	From Russia With Lou & Annie	YouTube	Kat	Writer	Episode 16: "Matchday 16"	
2018	Viraltown	YouTube	Ensemble actor		Episodes 1, 3, 6, 8	
2018	Rob & Beth	YouTube	Laura			
2019	That friend who's stopped drinking	Vimeo	Alex			
2021	Taking Stock	YouTube	Lorraine (Voice)		Episode 9: "Productivity"	
2021	Taking Stock	YouTube	Michaela (Voice)		Episodes 2, 5, 8	

=== Live performance ===
Year	Title	Role	Venue		Ref.
2018	Succubus Fringe Edition	Host/Presenter	Edinburgh Fringe Festival		
2018	Tracy's Leaving Party: Hot Young Things	Self	Edinburgh Fringe Festival	Work in progress show with Christy Coysh	

== Media appearances ==
Radio:

- 9 July 2025 – Front Row, BBC Radio 4 – discussing Such Brave Girls.
