= Spike Fearn =

English actor

- Born: 9 December 2000 (age 25); Coalville, Leicestershire, England
- Occupation: Actor
- Years active: 2019–present

Spike Fearn (born 9 December 2000) is an English actor. On television, he is known for his role in the ITVX teen drama Tell Me Everything (2022–2024). His films include Alien: Romulus (2024), Ella McCay (2025) and Finding Emily (2026). He was named a 2024 Screen International Star of Tomorrow.

== Early life ==
Spike Fearn was born on 9 December 2000. Fearn grew up in Coalville, Leicestershire. His father is a car mechanic and his mother is a teacher. He has dyslexia and ADHD. Fearn received his acting training from The Television Workshop in Nottingham.

== Career ==
Fearn began his career with small roles in films such as Sweetheart, The Batman and Aftersun.

In August 2021, he was cast as one of the leads in the ITV2 drama series Tell Me Everything. In October 2022, he was cast in a television series adaptation of the Kazuo Ishiguro novel Never Let Me Go greenlit at FX, however the series was cancelled before production began in February 2023.

In 2024, Fearn appeared as Tyler James in the Amy Winehouse biopic Back to Black, and in Alien: Romulus, an instalment in the Alien franchise directed by Fede Álvarez. In 2025, he played a supporting role in James L. Brooks' film Ella McCay. In 2026, he played co-lead role Owen Brompton in rom-com Finding Emily.

== Filmography ==
=== Film ===
Year	Title	Role	Notes
2021	Sweetheart	Elvis	
2022	The Batman	Vandal	
2022	Aftersun	Olly	
2024	Back to Black	Tyler James	
2024	Alien: Romulus	Bjorn	
2025	Ella McCay	Casey McCay	
2026	Finding Emily	Owen Bromptom	
2027	4 Kids Walk Into a Bank †	Wally	Post-production
TBA	Sweetsick †	TBA	Post-production
TBA	Running †	TBA	Filming

=== Television ===
Year	Title	Role	Notes
2021	The Amazing Mr. Blunden	Tom	Television film
2022	Newark, Newark	Jack	3 episodes
2022–2024	Tell Me Everything	Louis Green	Main role
