= A Great Divide =

- Directed by: Jean Shim
- Produced by: Jean Shim; Jeff Yang; Brian Yang
- Starring: Ken Jeong; Jae Suh Park; Emerson Min; Miya Cech
- Cinematography: Ray Huang
- Edited by: Lam T. Nguyen
- Music by: Everett Kim
- Production companies: BenJen Production Company; Raison D'Entre
- Distributed by: Vertical Entertainment; Gravitas Ventures
- Release date: June 13, 2023
- Running time: 100 minutes
- Country: United States
- Language: English

A Great Divide is a 2023 American drama film directed, written and co-produced by Jean Shim, in his feature film directorial debut.

The film premiered on June 13, 2023, at the Bentonville Film Festival.

== Plot ==
The film follows the Korean American Lee family, who move from a big city in California to a small town in Wyoming. They don't expect the residents to pose a greater threat than the dangerous animals they encounter along the way. Father Isaac believes it's important to try to fit in during this new beginning, while mother Jenna refuses to change her reactions to the unfriendly residents. Son Benjamin quickly develops homesickness, missing his best friend Ellie. Despite this, the family must work together as outsiders to confront the close-knit community that resists change.

In order to get into a prestigious local school, Benjamin is required to write an essay on his family. For inspiration, he talks with his grandmother about her escape from North Korea and subsequent journey to America. He meets Hunter, from a classmate who is initially cold to him.

Ellie visits Benjamin for a number of weeks. One day on a drive into the countryside, they see Hunter on a mountain bike trip with his friend Wyatt and abusive father, Tom, who is also a corrupt local ranger. Seeing Hunter has forgotten his helmet, Benjamin loans him one. Later, while picking wildflowers, Ellie is bitten by a snake. Benjamin rushes off for help and gets Wyatt and Hunter to stop. Wyatt forces Benjamin to kill the snake before he takes Ellie to the hospital.

It turns out that the snake was a harmless bull snake. Tom uses the incident to extort the Lees for a sizable donation to the ranger station. Isaac and Jenna argue over whether to pay or fight, each expressing how their experiences with racism drive their decisions. Benjamin meets Hunter at his home and asks him to tell the truth about Wyatt. Hunter sends him a video that absolves him, with which the Lees successfully confront Tom. Benjamin and Ellie kiss for the first time when they drop her off at the airport for her journey home. Benjamin finishes his essay, expressing hope for a world where humans aren't divided.

== Cast ==
- Ken Jeong as Isaac Lee
- Jae Suh Park as Jenna Lee
- Emerson Min as Benjamin Lee
- Miya Cech as Ellie Licht
- MeeWha Alana Lee as Grandma Shim
- Seamus Dever as Tom Drake
- West Mulholland as Hunter Drake
- Marshall Allman as Wyatt Schlang
- Jamie McShane as George McNather
- Greg Winter as Kent Taylor
- Brooke Markham as Kendra Taylor
- Abbie Cobb as Debbi Jackson

== Production ==
The film was directed and co-produced by Jean Shim in his feature film directorial debut and was produced by Jeff Yang and Brian Yang. Shim also co-wrote the film's screenplay with Jeff Yang and Martina Nagel. The music in the film was composed by Everett Kim. The film stars Ken Jeong, Jae Suh Park, Emerson Min and Miya Cech.

Filming took place primarily in Jackson Hole, Wyoming.

== Release ==
A Great Divide premiered on June 13, 2023, at the Bentonville Film Festival in Bentonville, Arkansas. The first trailer was released on October 24, 2024. The film then opened in select theaters on November 26, 2024, and was simultaneously released on video on demand services.
