= Running (upcoming film) =

- Directed by: Gavin O'Connor
- Screenplay by: Bill Dubuque
- Story by: Gavin O'Connor; Bill Dubuque
- Produced by: Brad Weston
- Starring: Spike Fearn; Brian Tyree Henry; Rhea Seehorn; Andrew Schulz; Teyonah Parris
- Production companies: Apple Studios; Makeready; Nike, Inc.; Waffle Iron Entertainment
- Distributed by: Apple Original Films
- Country: United States
- Language: English

Running is an upcoming American sports drama film directed by Gavin O'Connor.

== Cast ==
- Spike Fearn
- Brian Tyree Henry
- Rhea Seehorn
- Andrew Schulz
- Emily Meade
- Teyonah Parris

== Production ==
It was announced in November 2025 that Gavin O'Connor was set to direct the film, with Bill Dubuque writing the screenplay. The film would be a partnership with Nike, Inc., which will help produce the film. The film received an official greenlight in January 2026, with Spike Fearn cast to star. Brian Tyree Henry, Rhea Seehorn, and Andrew Schulz would be added to the cast in the following months, with Seehorn cast as a track and field coach. In August, Teyonah Parris was added to the cast.

Filming had begun by July 2026.
