= The Color of the Sun =

2026 coming-of-age film by Xavier Tera

- Japanese: 太陽ぬ色
- Directed by: Xavier Tera
- Written by: Xavier Tera
- Produced by: Stella Savino; Janie Chartier; Antonio Miyakawa; Jeremy O. Harris; Shogen
- Starring: Naoto Shimajiri; West Mulholland; Ichiro Andre Castro
- Cinematography: Sayombhu Mukdeeprom
- Edited by: Véronique Barbe
- Music by: Philippe Aubin-Dionne; Jason Chung Won
- Production companies: MIA Film; Double Garage Films; Twin Brains Films; Wise Pictures
- Release date: 9 September 2026 (Venice)
- Running time: 111 minutes
- Countries: Canada; Italy; Japan
- Languages: Japanese; English

The Color of the Sun (Japanese / Okinawan: 太陽ぬ色) is a 2026 coming-of-age film written and directed by Xavier Tera, in his feature debut. A co-production of Canada, Italy, and Japan, it stars Naoto Shimajiri, West Mulholland, and Ichiro Andre Castro.

The film had its world premiere in the Orizzonti section of the 83rd Venice International Film Festival on 9 September 2026, and won the FIPRESCI Prize.

== Premise ==
Set in Okinawa, it follows the complicated relationship of locals with the U.S. occupation forces, based on the island since the end of the World War II.

== Cast ==
- Naoto Shimajiri as Kamei
- West Mulholland as Colin
- Ichiro Andre Castro
- Daido
- Yuma Taira as Sayaka
- Shiyun Nakamura
- Erika Oda
- Sachiko Fukumoto

== Production ==
Thai cinematographer Sayombhu Mukdeeprom was the director of photography, and shot the film in 35mm film.

== Release ==
The film had its world premiere in the Orizzonti section of the 83rd Venice International Film Festival on 9 September 2026. Shortly before its premiere, The Pool Films acquired world rights for the film. It is slated to have its Canadian premiere in the National Competition at the 2026 Festival du nouveau cinéma.
