= Ken Meyer (film producer) =

American filmmaker

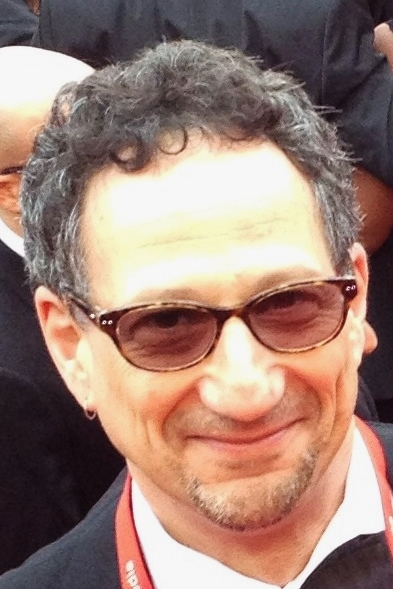
- Film producer Ken Meyer
- Born: New York City, U.S.
- Education: Columbia University
- Occupations: Film producer, lawyer

Ken Meyer is a filmmaker, executive, and attorney, most frequently associated with the independent films of director Steven Soderbergh. He was an executive producer of the film Anora (2024), which won Best Picture at the 97th Academy Awards and the Palme d’Or at the 77th Cannes Film Festival.

== Early life and education ==
Meyer was born and raised in New York City. While still in high school, he participated in The Experiment in International Living and studied at the University of Madrid Complutense. Meyer earned his B.A. in anthropology from Columbia University where he also studied narrative non-fiction writing under Seymour Krim. He earned a J.D. from Loyola Law School in Los Angeles.

== Career ==
Meyer has been credited on more than ninety film and television productions as a producer, executive producer, assistant director, script doctor, dialect coach, actor, and/or production lawyer. In addition to his association with director Steven Soderbergh and Soderbergh's distributor, Fingerprint Releasing, Meyer's work also includes collaborations with filmmakers Werner Herzog, David Lynch, Claude Chabrol, Wolfgang Petersen, Claudia Llosa, Sean Baker, Jodie Foster, and Reid Carolin, among others. Films that Meyer has produced or executive produced have premiered at the Cannes, Berlin, Toronto, Venice, Sundance, and San Sebastian film festivals.

Meyer's executive producing and producing credits include Anora (2024) starring Mikey Madison, which won the Palme d’Or at the 77th Cannes Film Festival and five Oscars; Presence (2024), starring Lucy Liu and Chris Sullivan; Accidentally Brave (2023), starring Maddie Corman; Command Z (2023), starring Michael Cera and Roy Wood, Jr.; Dog (2022), starring Channing Tatum; Fever Dream (2021), starring Maria Valverde and Dolores Fonzi; Let Them All Talk (2020), starring Meryl Streep, Candice Bergen and Dianne Wiest; High Flying Bird (2019), starring André Holland and Zazie Beetz; Unsane (2018), starting Claire Foy; Logan Lucky (2017), starring Channing Tatum, Riley Keough, Daniel Craig and Adam Driver; The 11th Hour (2014) (aka I Am Here), starring Kim Basinger; Skateistan: Four Wheels and a Board in Kabul (2011), which won the Cinema For Peace award for Most Valuable Documentary of the Year; Janie Jones (2010), starring Abigail Breslin and Alessandro Nivola; Repo Chick (2009), starring Rosanna Arquette; My Son, My Son, What Have Ye Done? (2009), starring Michael Shannon and Willem Dafoe; So, You've Downloaded a Demon (2007); Jacks or Better (2000); and The Frog Prince (1992), starring Harvey Korman and Daphne Zuniga. Other credits include the Oscar-nominated September 5 (2024), starring Peter Sarsgaard; Side Effects (2013), starring Jude Law and Rooney Mara; and Magic Mike (2012), starring Channing Tatum.

== Other ==
Meyer has lived and worked for extended periods in Spain, France, and Germany and speaks four languages fluently. Beginning his career in Paris, he was initially employed in men's professional tennis as a writer and photographer for International Tennis Weekly and later as a press liaison and simultaneous interpreter for the ATP Tour players. While working at the French Open at Roland Garros, he appeared briefly in William Klein's documentary, The French (1983).

Before transitioning into fictional film and television production, Meyer worked on news reports and documentaries for American and Japanese networks, shooting on location across most of Western Europe and North Africa. On the 1980–1981 Dupont Award-winning Inside Afghanistan documentary, Meyer was the communications coordinator between the field crew in Afghanistan and NBC News in New York.

Meyer has served as a juror at the Oldenburg International Film Festival in Germany. He is a member of the Directors Guild of America, Producers Guild of America, and Writers Guild of America, and lectures regularly at universities and international conferences on independent film financing, co-productions, and entertainment business matters.
