= Such Brave Girls =

British television series

- US promotional poster
- Genre: Sitcom
- Written by: Kat Sadler
- Directed by: Marco Alessi; Simon Bird
- Starring: Kat Sadler; Louise Brealey; Lizzie Davidson
- Country of origin: United Kingdom
- Original language: English
- No. of series: 2
- No. of episodes: 12

Production
- Executive producers: Phil Clarke; Jack Bayles; Piers Wenger; Kat Sadler
- Producer: Catherine Gosling Fuller
- Production companies: Various Artists Limited; A24

Original release
- Network: BBC Three
- Release: 22 November 2023 – present

Such Brave Girls is a British television sitcom about a dysfunctional single-parent family created by Kat Sadler for BBC Three. It stars Sadler, with Louise Brealey and Lizzie Davidson. It is directed by Simon Bird and produced by A24 with Various Artists Ltd. The first series was released on 22 November 2023. The second series ran from 3 July 2025 with all episodes released on BBC iPlayer. A third series was commissioned in May 2026.

Sadler has described the series as an "angry sitcom about three women trying their absolute best to bend the very warped world we live in to their advantage. It's about the narcissism we cling to in the face of unrelenting stress, the shared delusion of hope and the politics of sex and money and power. But it's also a light hearted sitcom that really needs you to laugh".

== Synopsis ==
Deb, a forty-something single mother, is trying to rebuild her life with her boyfriend Dev. Her two adult daughters, Josie and Billie, still live with her and complicate her life. She wants them to be married off as soon as possible.

The older sibling, Josie, is navigating mental illness and her sexual identity. She is engaged, then married to Seb. Her young sister, Billie, is in a toxic relationship.

== Cast and characters ==
- Kat Sadler as Josie Johnson
- Louise Brealey as Deb Johnson
- Lizzie Davidson as Billie Johnson
- Freddie Meredith as Seb
- Paul Bazely as Dev Wilson
- Jude Mack as Sid (series 1)
- Sam Buchanan as Nicky
- Carla Woodcock as Bianca
- Amy Trigg as Claire
- Keith Evans as Police Officer (series 2)

== Episodes ==
=== Series overview ===
| Series | Episodes | Originally released | |
| Series | Episodes | First released | Last released |
|---|---|---|---|
| 1 | 6 | 22 November 2023 | 22 November 2023 |
| 2 | 6 | 3 July 2025 | 3 July 2025 |

=== Series 1 (2023) ===
| No. overall | No. in series | Title | Directed by | Written by | Original release date |
|---|---|---|---|---|---|
| 1 | 1 | "Such Happy Girls" | Marco Alessi & Simon Bird | Kat Sadler | 22 November 2023 |
Deb invites Dev to her house for the first time, and orders Josie and Billie to behave happier for him. Billie struggles with her fracturing relationship with on-and-off boyfriend Nicky, bleaching her hair to look more like his current girlfriend, Bianca.
| 2 | 2 | "Such Unavailable Girls" | Simon Bird | Kat Sadler | 22 November 2023 |
Deb visits Dev's house, and learns that he is a widower; Deb lies and claims that her ex-husband had died too, bringing her and Dev closer. Josie attempts to break up with her boyfriend Seb and initiate a relationship with lesbian bartender Sid; both are unsuccessful. Billie is back together with Nicky, but finds him too unwilling to commit to their relationship. The episode ends with Billie learning that she is pregnant.
| 3 | 3 | "Such Birthday Girls" | Simon Bird | Kat Sadler | 22 November 2023 |
The family goes out to a birthday dinner for Josie, which she prolongs in order to avoid giving a handjob to Seb. Billie gets an abortion; Nicky walks out on her once Josie mentions this to him. In revenge, Billie outs Josie as a lesbian to Seb, but this has no effect.
| 4 | 4 | "Such Outdoorsy Girls" | Simon Bird | Kat Sadler | 22 November 2023 |
The family goes on an outdoor expedition. Dev remains distraught over the death of his previous wife, leading Deb to believe she's acting as a replacement for her. Josie attempts to get back to her art, but suffers from debilitating writer's block. After the two daughters visit a remote church, Billie dabbles with religion as a coping mechanism for Nicky's exit.
| 5 | 5 | "Such Friendly Girls" | Simon Bird | Kat Sadler | 22 November 2023 |
After visiting their dying grandmother in the hospital, Josie and Billie cope by going to a nightclub. After the two do cocaine in the bathroom, Josie decides to try again with Sid, while Billie plots revenge on Bianca. When Dev suggests the daughters try therapy, Deb is offended by the suggestion; insisting that having a man in their life is enough. On this advice, Seb has moved in with the family.
| 6 | 6 | "Such Daddy's Girls" | Simon Bird | Kat Sadler | 22 November 2023 |
The family visits the funeral of the girls' grandmother, where the two daughters hope to meet their absent father. After their father doesn't show up, Dev (who still believes he's dead) asks to see his tombstone. Meanwhile, Billie goes to Manchester for the opening of Nicky's ice bar. In Manchester, she runs into Bianca again. At the end of the episode, Dev unwittingly reveals that the girls' father had been present at the funeral after all, but ran away in fear after seeing his daughters there.

=== Series 2 (2025) ===
| No. overall | No. in series | Title | Directed by | Written by | Original release date |
|---|---|---|---|---|---|
| 7 | 1 | "Such Kept Girls" | Simon Bird | Kat Sadler | 3 July 2025 |
Josie starts art school, with a new romantic interest called Charlie. However, she is kidnapped by Deb and Billie in a lecture. She is taken to her wedding with Seb, which she attempts to run away from but crashes the car in the process. At the same time, Billie attempt to have sex with the older man she is having an affair with. In the meantime, Deb persuades Dev to propose to her. However, Dev is informed by another wedding guest that Josie and Billie's father is not dead. The episode ends with Josie admitting to Deb she crashed her car.
| 8 | 2 | "Such Faithful Girls" | Simon Bird | Kat Sadler | 3 July 2025 |
At their engagement dinner, Dev reveals that he knows Spencer (Josie and Billie's father) is not dead, causing uncertainty in the pair's relationship. Deb becomes involved with an old flame with a gambling problem. Josie is deeply in love with Charlie; she uses the guise of a "late night" book club to sneak out for Charlie. However, when Josie is sectioned and contacts her "girlfriend", Charlie says Josie has been obsessively stalking her. Meanwhile, Billie is still pursuing her affair with an older man. She demands that they have their affair in a hotel, rather than a car.
| 9 | 3 | "Such Mummy's Girls" | Simon Bird | Kat Sadler | 3 July 2025 |
| 10 | 4 | "Such Wily Girls" | Simon Bird | Kat Sadler | 3 July 2025 |
| 11 | 5 | "Such Forgiving Girls" | Simon Bird | Kat Sadler | 3 July 2025 |
| 12 | 6 | "Such Desperate Girls" | Simon Bird | Kat Sadler | 3 July 2025 |

== Production ==
The series was created and written by Kat Sadler, who also stars. It is directed by Simon Bird and was produced for Various Artists Ltd and A24 by Catherine Gosling Fuller, with Phil Clarke, Jack Bayles, Piers Wenger and Sadler as executive producers. It was commissioned after a successful 2021 pilot episode.

Sadler appears in the series alongside her real life sister Lizzie Davidson, and they play sisters on the show. Sadler told The Times that Davidson read the drafts and acted as her "sense check … telling me if I've gone too mad". She described their characters of Josie and Billie as "not us, but they are certainly inspired by bits of us … we have taken some of the worst aspects of ourselves". She said that their own mother had seen it "and laughed in all the right places".

Bird wrote to Sadler asking to direct the series after watching the 2021 pilot episode, with Sadler and Bird agreeing to keep the series as a comedy rather than veer towards comedy-drama.

A second six-part series was commissioned in May 2024.

=== Filming ===
Filming began in May 2023. The first episode uses locations like County Mall and the Martlets in Crawley. Ostensibly, the sitcom is set in this West Sussex town. However, the majority of the episodes were filmed across Merseyside, with locations including The Wirral and Knowsley.

==== Featured Locations ====
- Linghams Booksellers, Heswall - Series 1
- Mini Monster's Funhouse, Gayton - Series 1
- West Kirby bar "The Wild Inn" - Series 1: episode 2
- The Mediterranean Kitchen, Higher Bebington - Series 1: Episode 3
- Wirral Country Park, Thurstaston - Series 1: Episode 4
- St Michael's Church, Shotwick - Series 1: Episode 4
- Heswall Hall - Series 1, Episode 5
- Heswall United Reformed Church, Heswall, Merseyside - Series 1: Episode 6
- Hooton Hand Car Wash - Series 1: Episode 6

== Broadcast ==
The first series started airing in the United Kingdom on BBC Three on 22 November 2023, with all episodes released on BBC iPlayer the same day. It was available in the United States on Hulu from 15 December 2023.

The second series started airing in the United Kingdom on BBC Three on 3 July 2025, with all episodes released on BBC iPlayer the same day.

== Reception ==
For series one, the review aggregator website Rotten Tomatoes reported a 100% approval rating based on 21 critic reviews. The website's critics consensus reads, "Painfully funny and sometimes just downright painful, Such Brave Girls is a spiky showcase for its trio of stars." For series two, Rotten Tomatoes reported a 100% approval rating based on 11 critic reviews.

Lucy Mangan in The Guardian described the show as "properly brutal and properly funny", saying that she found "particular joy in seeing a woman-led, female-written show that doesn't pull its punches". She added that it was "brave – singular, fresh, scabrous and unflinching – but still – or, rather, as a result – hilarious."

Steve Bennett for Chortle gave the show four stars, commenting that "elements of pure sitcom" combine with an "earthy, nuanced realism of the dysfunctional characters" with Sadler's "unique comic sensibilities" combining with an "admirable reluctance to take serious issues seriously" which "makes for an impressively different series."

The Big Issue described the series as "one of the funniest British comedies in years."

== Accolades ==
| Year | Award | Category | Nominee | Result | Ref. |
|---|---|---|---|---|---|
| 2024 | Chortle Awards | Best TV Show | Such Brave Girls | Nominated | |
| 2024 | Royal Television Society Programme Awards | Best Scripted Comedy | Such Brave Girls | Nominated | |
| 2024 | Royal Television Society Programme Awards | Best Comedy Performance | Kat Salder | Nominated | |
| 2024 | Royal Television Society Programme Awards | Best Comedy Performance | Freddie Meredith | Nominated | |
| 2024 | British Academy Television Awards | Best Scripted Comedy | Such Brave Girls | Won | |
| 2024 | Broadcasting Press Guild Awards | Best Comedy | Such Brave Girls | Nominated | |
| 2026 | Royal Television Society Programme Awards | Best Scripted Comedy | Such Brave Girls | Nominated | |
| 2026 | Royal Television Society Programme Awards | Writer - Comedy | Kat Sadler | Won | |
| 2026 | BAFTA | Best Comedy Writer | Kat Sadler | Nominated | |
