= Jabari Banks =

American actor and musician (born 1998)

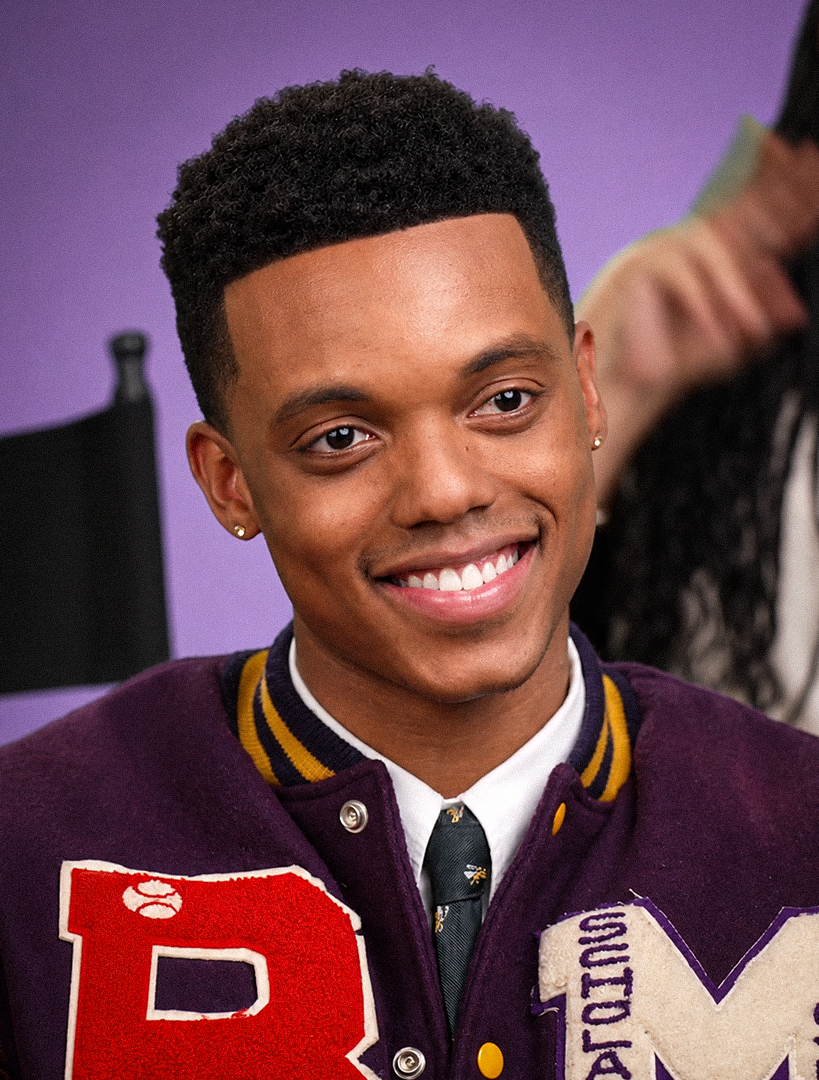
- Banks in 2023
- Born: Patrick Jabari Campbell; August 2, 1998 (age 28); Prince George's County, Maryland, U.S.
- Education: University of the Arts (attended)
- Occupations: Actor; singer; songwriter
- Years active: 2022–present

Patrick Jabari Campbell (born August 2, 1998), known professionally as Jabari Banks, is an American actor and musician. He is best known for starring as Will Smith in the Peacock drama Bel-Air (2022–2025). He released his debut EP ULTRA in 2025.

== Early life ==
Patrick Jabari Campbell was born on 2 August 1998 in Prince George’s County, Maryland. He spent his childhood in West Philadelphia, After high school, he moved to North Philadelphia for about six years while attending the University of the Arts. Campbell studied musical theater before leaving the program during the COVID-19 pandemic.

According to Campbell, he began using his middle name, Jabari, professionally in high school. He later chose the surname "Banks" as a stage name, inspired by his favorite television series, The Fresh Prince of Bel-Air.

== Career ==
Banks began his career in 2022 with the leading role of Will Smith in Peacock’s Bel-Air, a dramatic reimagining of the 1990 sitcom The Fresh Prince of Bel-Air. He also performed as a musician and releases songs under the name Jabari. In December 2023, Banks signed with Epic Records. He released his debut single "Something Else", on December 1, 2023. making his entry into the music industry alongside his acting career.

In 2024 his performance on the series Bel-Air earned him another nomination for Outstanding Actor in a Drama Series at the 2024 NAACP Image Awards. In 2024, Banks was cast in the thriller film Bad Genius. That same year he released the song "Weekend Drive". The following year, he released his debut extended play ULTRA.

== Discography ==
=== Extended play ===
List of EPs
Title	Music Details	Year released
ULTRA	Released: September 8, 2025; Number of Tracks: 8; Label: Epic Records; Formats: Streaming, digital download	2025

=== Singles ===
- "Something Else" (2023)
- "Weekend Drive" (2024)

== Filmography ==
=== Television ===
Year	Title	Role	Notes
2022–2025	Bel-Air	Will Smith	Main role, 38 episodes
TBA	Myron Bolitar	Dwayne Richmond	Main role, upcoming series

=== Film ===
Year	Title	Role	Notes
2024	Bad Genius	Bank Adedamola	Feature film
2025	Diary of a Wimpy Kid: The Last Straw	Lenwood Heath (voice)	Feature film

=== Film score ===
- Bel-Air (2022)

== Awards and nominations ==
Award	Year	Category	Work	Result	Ref.
BET Awards	2022	Best Actor	Bel-Air	Nominated	
NAACP Image Awards	2023	Outstanding Actor in a Drama Series	Bel-Air	Nominated	
NAACP Image Awards	2024	Outstanding Actor in a Drama Series	Bel-Air	Nominated	
Black Reel Awards	2024	Outstanding Lead Performance in a Drama Series	Bel-Air	Nominated	
NAACP Image Awards	2025	Outstanding Actor in a Drama Series	Bel-Air	Nominated	
NAACP Image Awards	2026	Outstanding Actor in a Drama Series	Bel-Air	Nominated	
