= Presence (2024 film) =

Film by Steven Soderbergh

- Theatrical release poster
- Directed by: Steven Soderbergh
- Written by: David Koepp
- Produced by: Julie M. Anderson; Ken Meyer
- Starring: Lucy Liu; Chris Sullivan; Callina Liang; Eddy Maday; West Mulholland; Julia Fox
- Cinematography: Peter Andrews
- Edited by: Mary Ann Bernard
- Music by: Zack Ryan
- Production companies: Sugar23; Extension 765
- Distributed by: Neon
- Release dates: January 19, 2024 (Sundance); January 24, 2025 (United States)
- Running time: 85 minutes
- Country: United States
- Language: English
- Budget: $2 million
- Box office: $11.1 million

Presence is a 2024 American supernatural thriller drama film directed by Steven Soderbergh and written by David Koepp. Starring Lucy Liu, Chris Sullivan, Callina Liang, Eddy Maday, West Mulholland, and Julia Fox, the film follows a family that moves into a new house, where a mysterious presence haunts the place.

Presence premiered at the Sundance Film Festival on January 19, 2024. It was released in U.S. theaters by Neon on January 24, 2025. The film has grossed $11.1 million worldwide on a $2 million production budget, and received positive reviews from critics.

== Plot ==
An unseen Presence roams through a dark, empty suburban house. (Note: Depicted in first-person, from the viewer's point of view) A realtor, Cece, shows the house to Rebekah and Chris Payne, and their teenage children, Tyler and Chloe. Rebekah and Chris discuss the move and its implications for Tyler, who will flourish on the new school's swim team, and Chloe, who is emotionally vulnerable after a traumatic event.

A work crew renovates the house, and some of the members seem to sense the Presence. After the Paynes move in, Rebekah has a phone conversation implying that she may be involved in white-collar crime. She shares this with Tyler, justifying her actions. Chloe is crying in her room when she senses the Presence and calls out the name of her recently deceased friend, Nadia.

Chris expresses concern for Chloe, while Rebekah remains distant. Tyler's new friend Ryan comes over, and Tyler introduces him to Chloe. Ryan, who steals and abuses drugs from his pharmacist father, and Tyler talk about obtaining drugs for a party. The Presence closes Chloe's door, shielding her from the interaction. Tension grows in the family as Rebekah continues showing favoritism to Tyler over Chloe, upsetting Chris. He consults a lawyer friend about whether legal separation would shield someone from liability if their spouse committed a crime.

Chloe and Ryan use drugs and talk in her room. Chloe discusses her grief over Nadia and another girl she knew, while Ryan shares his struggle with control. They kiss, but the Presence interrupts by knocking down a shelf. At dinner, Chloe reveals that she has been sensing the Presence. Tyler mocks her, leading to a heated argument. Tyler accuses Chris of always taking Chloe's side and questions her grip on reality, but Chris defends her.

Tyler recounts to Rebekah that he and his friends catfished a female classmate to obtain a nude photo. Rebekah laughs this off until Chloe interrupts, showing them the photo on her phone and accusing Tyler of leaking it online. The Presence wrecks Tyler's room as the family watches.

The family retreat outside. Chloe insists the poltergeist is Nadia and means no harm, but Tyler lashes out at her. Chris defends Chloe. Cece reassures him that no one has died in the house. She refers him to her sister-in-law, Lisa, a psychic medium. Lisa visits and explains that the Presence is possibly experiencing time non-linearly but means no harm. Rebekah and Tyler are skeptical.

Chloe and Ryan have sex, after which he secretly spikes her drink. Before Chloe can drink it, the Presence spills it. Lisa returns and warns Chris that she believes the Presence is there to prevent a future event.

The Presence's physical influence wanes. Chris confides in Rebekah that he considered divorce, and they reconcile before leaving on a business trip. The Presence approaches a drunken Tyler, who appears to sense it but gets distracted by Ryan's arrival. Ryan drugs Tyler's drink, leaving him unconscious in the living room, and brings another spiked drink to Chloe.

Chloe refuses to have sex, but Ryan pressures her into drinking, incapacitating her. He begins suffocating her with plastic wrap, bragging that he killed Nadia and the other girl the same way, staging both as overdoses. The Presence, unable to intervene, wakes Tyler, who rushes upstairs and tackles Ryan, causing both to crash through Chloe's bedroom window and fall to their deaths.

Some time later, as the family is preparing to move out of the house, Rebekah senses the Presence and follows it to a mirror in the living room. She sees Tyler in the reflection and breaks down, realizing his spirit was displaced in time and had come to save his sister's life. As Chris and Chloe draw close to her, the Presence leaves the house and ascends into the sky.

== Cast ==
- Lucy Liu as Rebekah Payne
- Chris Sullivan as Chris Payne, the father of Chloe and Tyler
- Callina Liang as Chloe Payne, Rebekah and Chris's daughter and Tyler's younger sister. She is upset and grieving the death of her friend Nadia prior to the move.
- Eddy Maday as Tyler Payne, Rebekah and Chris's son and Chloe's older brother. He is a competitive swimmer, and Rebekah wanted to move to support his performance.
- West Mulholland as Ryan Caldwell, Tyler's new friend
- Julia Fox as Cece, the realtor
- Natalie Woolams-Torres as Lisa, the medium
- Lucas Papaelias as Carl, Lisa's husband

== Production ==
=== Development ===
The film, written by David Koepp and directed by Steven Soderbergh, was not announced publicly until December 2023 when it was revealed to be part of the 2024 Sundance Film Festival.

The concept originated with Soderbergh, who was inspired by his own beliefs of living with a presence in his house, which he and his wife called "Mimi": "It got me thinking about how Mimi would feel about us being in her house. Is Mimi pissed at us living here?". Soderbergh remains personally skeptical of the existence of ghosts, despite his mother being a parapsychologist. He wrote 10 pages of a script before handing it off to Koepp, who then fleshed out the plot and added the movie's final twist.

=== Filming ===
Principal photography took place over 11 days in September 2023 with an interim SAG-AFTRA agreement from the 2023 SAG-AFTRA strike. The film is shot entirely in the first-person perspective, and was filmed in a house in Cranford, New Jersey. Of the film's low budget and quick production time, Soderbergh stated: "The beauty of projects at this scale is I can just do them without having to talk to anybody."

Soderbergh did his own cinematography and most of the filming, under his pseudonym, Peter Andrews. The film was shot on a Sony mirrorless camera with a DJI Ronin stabilizer, with Soderbergh wearing nylon and rubber slippers to reduce noise from his own footsteps. Much of the film consists of non-traditional cinematography and long shots, which Soderbergh describes as "mini plays". Describing the conceit, Soderbergh said: "It might be the simplest idea I've ever had … The camera’s the ghost". The several shots in which Soderbergh had to go up and down stairs while filming were a particular challenge, since Soderbergh had to look at his feet while walking. He rehearsed aiming the camera at these moments by feel alone, but still spoiled several long takes partway through.

== Release ==
The film premiered at the 2024 Sundance Film Festival on January 19, 2024. Shortly after, Neon acquired distribution rights to the film for $5 million.

The film premiered in New York City on January 16, 2025. It was released in theaters in the United States on January 24, 2025.

== Reception ==
=== Box office ===
Presence grossed $6.9 million in the United States and Canada, and $3.9 million in other territories, for a worldwide total of $10.8 million.

In the United States and Canada, Presence was released alongside Flight Risk and Brave the Dark and was projected to gross $2–3 million from 1,750 theaters in its opening weekend. It made $1.4 million on its first day, including an estimated $385,000 from Thursday night previews. It went on to debut to $3.3 million, finishing in sixth.

=== Critical response ===
On the review aggregator website Rotten Tomatoes, 88% of 252 critics' reviews are positive, with an average rating of 7.10/10. The website's consensus reads: "A slow-burning spectral thriller, Presence reaffirms that Soderbergh plays with form as deftly as he flits between genres." Metacritic, which uses a weighted average, assigned the film a score of 77 out of 100, based on 53 critics, indicating "generally favorable" reviews. Audiences polled by CinemaScore gave the film an average grade of "C+" on an A+ to F scale, while those surveyed by PostTrak gave it a 58% overall positive score, with 33% saying they would "definitely recommend" it.

Critics particularly praised the film for its cinematography and lean, single-location structure. David Rooney of The Hollywood Reporter described it as "a nail-biting ghost story" with an "expertly honed screenplay". Devan Coggan of Entertainment Weekly praised it as "a taut character drama, a single-location nightmare that chronicles the Payne family’s unraveling". Saying that Presence "might be the best thing Soderbergh has done in ages," Bilge Ebiri of New York Magazine wrote that the film "isn’t afraid to be narratively predictable, because it’s out there visually. It’s an art film that also works as a spellbinding horror film". Stephanie Zacharek of Time described it as "a film that builds dread but also has some poetry in its heart". The film received a "NYT Critic's Choice" award from The New York Times, with Manohla Dargis calling it a "typically well-oiled, polished, frictionless Soderbergh whasit" with a "touchingly human" protagonist.

David Sims, writing for The Atlantic, was less positive about the movie's leanness, describing it as "less an entrée than a charming apéritif, albeit with a couple of smart twists worth ruminating on". In a mixed review, Mark Hanson of Slant said of the film that "The unoriginality of the story eventually calls out the POV conceit as a one-note gimmick", comparing it unfavorably with H.P. Mendoza's I Am a Ghost and Oz Perkins' I Am the Pretty Thing That Lives in the House. In one of the few negative reviews, Rex Reed of the New York Observer called it "a lifeless, cliché-ridden ghost story that delivers neither scares nor suspense" that is ultimately a "worthless" film.
