= Ella McCay =

2025 film by James L. Brooks

- Theatrical release poster
- Directed by: James L. Brooks
- Written by: James L. Brooks
- Produced by: James L. Brooks; Richard Sakai; Julie Ansell; Jennifer Brooks
- Starring: Emma Mackey; Jamie Lee Curtis; Jack Lowden; Kumail Nanjiani; Ayo Edebiri; Spike Fearn; Julie Kavner; Rebecca Hall; Albert Brooks; Woody Harrelson
- Cinematography: Robert Elswit
- Edited by: Tracey Wadmore-Smith
- Music by: Hans Zimmer
- Production company: Gracie Films
- Distributed by: 20th Century Studios
- Release dates: December 9, 2025 (El Capitan Theatre); December 12, 2025 (United States)
- Running time: 115 minutes
- Country: United States
- Language: English
- Budget: $35 million
- Box office: $5 million

Ella McCay is a 2025 American political comedy-drama film written and directed by James L. Brooks. Starring Emma Mackey in the titular role with Jamie Lee Curtis, Jack Lowden, Kumail Nanjiani, Ayo Edebiri, Spike Fearn, Julie Kavner, Rebecca Hall, Albert Brooks, and Woody Harrelson, the film follows fictional politician Ella McCay as she juggles the duties of governor with her own family issues.

Ella McCay premiered at the El Capitan Theatre on December 9, 2025, and was released in the United States by 20th Century Studios on December 12. The film received unfavorable reviews from American critics and grossed $5 million on a $35 million budget.

== Plot ==
In 2008, Ella McCay, the lieutenant governor of an unnamed state, is told by her mentor, Governor Bill Moore, that he is accepting a cabinet position in the forthcoming presidential administration. Moore resigns immediately, leaving Ella to take over as governor for the remaining fourteen months of his tenure.

Ella is ambitious and idealistic, but unpopular within her party for long speeches and proactive political style. Meanwhile, a reporter is attempting to blackmail Ella for using a vacant apartment underneath the government building to have sex with her husband Ryan during lunch breaks, which she later learned qualified as misuse of government property. At her aunt Helen's bar, Ella is reunited with her estranged father Eddie, who threw her life in turmoil after cheating on her mother, the now deceased Claire, when Ella was a teenager. Eddie announces that he is attempting to reconnect with his children at the request of his new girlfriend Olympia, though Ella rebuffs him for his lack of remorse.

Ella is inaugurated, and Ryan is offended when she neglects to thank him in a lengthy speech. State trooper Nash is assigned her driver and bodyguard. Ella sets to work passing a new bill that would offer support to new and expectant mothers, in turn benefiting their children in their most formative years. Ryan admits to having leaked word of their liaisons to the press. Disturbed, Ella seeks comfort with Helen, who bluntly tells her that Ryan is a "ticking time bomb". Ella visits her younger brother Casey, a bookmaker who has remained almost entirely in his apartment for the past year. Casey's self-imposed isolation is the result of having abruptly cut ties with his girlfriend Susan after she responded hesitantly to his impassioned declaration of love. Casey says that Eddie and Olympia have been leaving him invasive messages on his answering machine. Ella encourages Casey to reconnect with Susan.

Unwilling to let the story be leaked, Ella holds a press conference admitting to the scandal and offering to pay any restitution. Afterwards, Ella's approval ratings slightly improve. At her father's apartment, Ella tells Eddie to stop bothering Casey, and Eddie insincerely apologizes for his failings as a father. When Ella asks him if he ever cheated on Claire while she was dying, Eddie responds, "Not really." Meanwhile, Casey meets with Susan at her apartment, awkwardly rekindling their relationship together.

Ryan confronts Ella, furious that she held the press conference without consulting him. Ryan reveals that he bribed the reporter with a $7500 check, which Ella realizes can be used as proof of extortion. Ryan demands that Ella give him a position on her staff, or he will leave her and slander her reputation. Taking the blackmail as proof that Ryan does not love her, a heartbroken Ella refuses. Ryan then holds a press conference in which he announces their separation, blaming Ella for their marital breakdown, and claims that she is the one who attempted to pay off the reporter.

Party officials gather at Helen's bar, demanding that Ella either resign immediately or face being censured for the remainder of her term. On Bill's advice, Ella threatens to run for reelection as an independent and siphon votes from her party. The majority leader begrudgingly agrees to pass Ella's Mom's Bill, and a bill providing dental care for children, on the condition that she resigns from office. A defeated Ella leaves a mere three days after her inauguration – with a superlative record of legislative accomplishment. When Eddie asks her whether she accepted his tepid apology, Ella responds, "Not really," freeing her from his abuse. Meanwhile, Helen tips off the police about Ryan's role in the extortion, leading to his arrest. Casey's rekindled relationship with Susan thrives and he starts going out again. Ella starts a non-profit organization with Nash and Estelle that offers legal aid to impoverished families, enabling her to do more good beyond the confines of government.

== Cast ==
- Emma Mackey as Ella McCay
- Jamie Lee Curtis as Helen McCay, Ella and Casey's aunt and Eddie's older sister
- Jack Lowden as Ryan Newell, Ella's husband
- Kumail Nanjiani as State Trooper Nash, Ella's driver and bodyguard
- Ayo Edebiri as Susan, Casey's ex-girlfriend
- Julie Kavner as Estelle, Ella's secretary and the film's narrator
- Spike Fearn as Casey McCay, Ella's younger brother
- Rebecca Hall as Claire McCay, Ella and Casey's deceased mother
- Albert Brooks as Governor Bill Moore
- Woody Harrelson as Eddie McCay, Ella and Casey's father and Helen's younger brother
- Becky Ann Baker as Mrs. Newell, Ryan’s mother
- Sheetal Sheth as Audrey
- Joey Brooks as State Trooper Alexander
- Tracey Ullman as the voice of Olympia, Eddie's girlfriend

== Production ==
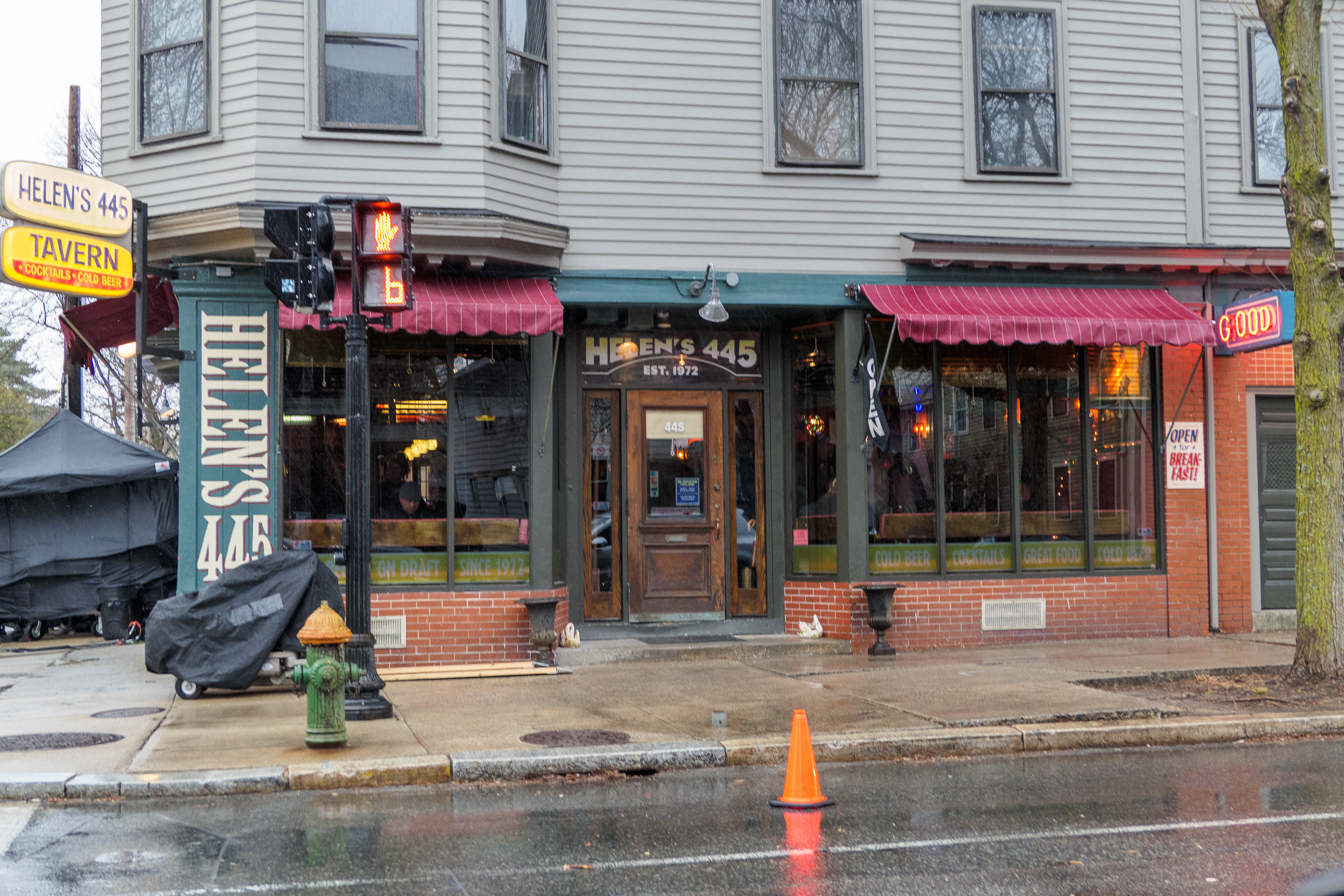
The set in Providence, Rhode Island for the Helen's 445 restaurant featured in Ella McCay

In November 2023, it was announced that James L. Brooks was set to write and direct his first film in thirteen years, with 20th Century Studios set as the distributor and Emma Mackey, Jamie Lee Curtis, Woody Harrelson, Ayo Edebiri, Albert Brooks, Kumail Nanjiani and Spike Fearn set to star. In February 2024, Jack Lowden and Rebecca Hall joined the cast.

Principal photography began in Rhode Island on February 1, 2024. Filming was announced as wrapped on May 3, but as of January 2025, more scenes were planned to be shot in Rhode Island in March. It was also expected to shoot in Cleveland and New Orleans that same month. In March 2025, Julie Kavner, Becky Ann Baker and Joey Brooks were revealed to be part of the cast. For Kavner, it was her first role not associated with The Simpsons, where she voices Marge Simpson, in nearly 20 years.

== Music ==
Hans Zimmer provided the film's score, marking his fifth collaboration with James L. Brooks. The soundtrack was released on December 12, 2025.

== Release ==
=== Theatrical ===
The film had its world premiere at the El Capitan Theatre in Los Angeles on December 9, 2025, and was released in the United States on December 12. It was previously scheduled to release on September 19, 2025. As a result of the initial poor reception, Disney pulled Ella McCay from its scheduled theatrical release in France and instead released it on Disney+ on February 5, 2026. However, following immense backlash and unexpected critical acclaim in France, the film will receive a limited two-day release in over 100 cinemas on May 15 and 16, 2026.

=== Home media ===
Ella McCay was released for digital purchase and rental on January 27, 2026, and for Blu-ray, and DVD on March 3, 2026 from Sony Pictures Home Entertainment. It was released on Hulu and Hulu on Disney+ on February 5, 2026.

== Reception ==
=== Box office ===
In the United States and Canada, Ella McCay was projected to gross around $4 million from 2,500 theaters in its opening weekend; however, it ultimately returned just over $2.1 million, making for a per-theater average of $808. Deadline Hollywood pointed to poor critical reception and speculated: "Once upon a time, Ella McCay would have clicked ... Prestige drama/dramedies, which audiences used to find in theaters thanks to Brooks, are too prevalent on TV at home. Why leave the house to watch them (now)?" In the second week of its theatrical run, Ella McCay saw a 77% decline in box office gross. Box office gross declined a further 75% in its third week and 68% in its fourth week.

=== Critical response ===
Metacritic review
breakdown (unweighted)

Positive
5 (14%)
Mixed
18 (50%)
Negative
13 (36%)

On the review aggregator website Rotten Tomatoes, 23% of 137 critics' reviews are positive, with an average rating of 4.3/10. The website's consensus reads: "Well-intentioned but woefully undisciplined, James L. Brooks's comedy about a woman trying to have it all is so tonally misjudged that it winds up with not much of anything to recommend." Metacritic, which uses a weighted average, assigned the film a score of 39 out of 100, based on 36 critics, indicating "generally unfavorable" reviews. Audiences polled by CinemaScore gave the film an average grade of "B-" on an A+ to F scale.

Adrian Horton of The Guardian called the film "...a mess – a clunky collection of incoherent characters and confounding plot that seem to defy basic story logic at every turn, and not in a surprising or intriguing way", and Nick Schager of The Daily Beast said it was "...woefully short on charm, its plot a contrived hodgepodge of so many similar ’80s and ’90s tales that it plays as a brand-spanking new relic."

In positive reviews, Nell Minow of RogerEbert.com said, "Its optimism is so refreshing, its dialogue so smart, and its characters and performances so endearing, it well rewards a watch," and Adam Nayman of Sight and Sound stated, "There are worse feelings to have at a movie than the suspicion that everything will work out just fine for the people who deserve it, and taken on its own terms, Brooks’s tale of virtue as its own reward is sufficiently endearing."

The poster inspired an internet meme known as the Ella McCay Challenge, wherein the challenger attempts to mimic the main character's pose. Vulture claimed the meme was more popular than the movie, and Kelsey McKinney wrote in Defector that it inspired her to see the film, which she summed up with "It isn't funny, and it doesn't make any sense."

In the aftermath of the poor critical and commercial response, co-star Albert Brooks came to its defense and said: "It got clobbered pretty hard for not being about today, or whatever. I liked the movie. I love Jim (Brooks), and I think Jim, in his sleep, is better than 90 percent of people. But it came out in a time when that kind of movie is not playing in theaters. That is what’s playing on streaming, and it’s unfortunate. I read some of the negative reviews to get a sense of what the issues are, and maybe it was that it feels earnest, but I couldn’t really make heads or tails of it. I think it’s right there with what he does so well… You’re allowed to say, ‘We don’t really want something like that.’ But to get violently angry, I didn’t get it."
