= Finding Emily =

2026 film by Alicia MacDonald

- Theatrical release poster
- Directed by: Alicia MacDonald
- Written by: Rachel Hirons
- Produced by: Tim Bevan; Eric Fellner; Olivier Kaempfer
- Starring: Angourie Rice; Spike Fearn; Minnie Driver
- Cinematography: Rachel Clark
- Edited by: Phil Hinge
- Music by: Morgan Kibby
- Production companies: Focus Features; Working Title Films
- Distributed by: Universal Pictures
- Release dates: 12 May 2026 (Manchester); 22 May 2026 (United Kingdom)
- Running time: 110 minutes
- Country: United Kingdom
- Language: English
- Box office: $3 million

Finding Emily is a 2026 British romantic comedy film directed by Alicia MacDonald, written by Rachel Hirons, and produced by Working Title Films. The film was released in the United Kingdom on 22 May 2026. The film received positive reviews.

== Plot ==
23-year-old Owen works as a sound engineer at a student union bar at the fictional Manchester City University. One night he meets a girl and finds himself falling for her. Abruptly, the girl leaves, giving him her first name, "Emily", and her phone number. The next morning, Owen tries to text Emily, only to find that she missed a digit in her number. Mocked by his older brother Matt, Owen sets about finding Emily.

Meanwhile, third-year psychology American student Emily Raine – a different Emily to the one Owen met – is under pressure to finish her thesis, a good mark on which will grant her allow her to retain her visa status whilst also giving her a prestigious job in Manchester. Her hypothesis is that love is a kind of madness and a vestigial evolutionary impulse. Owen comes to her class seeking Emily and when she meets him and learns of his search, she decides he is the perfect case study to base her thesis around.

Despite ethical concerns from her professor and flatmates, Emily befriends Owen under the pretense of helping him find Emily, leading to a series of misadventures. When Owen hits a brick wall while searching for Emily, she encourages him to continue and even goes to far as to provide him with a list of email address for every Emily on campus. Owen proceeds at her urging to anonymously email every Emily registered at the university, leading to controversy. Student Union President Emily Thewlis, an outspoken wannabe feminist, begins a campaign against the anonymous emailer, known as "Email Guy". Owen shocked but trying to do right and redeem himself agrees to go on a student podcast to speak about his quest to find Emily. During the interviews Owen admits that he hacked the email server to get the email list (to protect Emily Raine). Just as the interview is almost a disaster, Owen performs a song he wrote for the missing Emily, which unexpectedly goes viral.

Emily Thewlis organises a party for all of the "offended" Emily's and at Emily Raine's urging, Owen disguises himself as a pizza deliverer and sneaks into the party. Emily Thewlis apprehends him and threatens to call the police while the remaining Emilies chase him away. He and Emily Raine escape and go to a bar where the houseband invite him on stage.

The Dean of the college is forced to take action due to Emily Thewlis' constant complaints. Owen, due to his admission of stealing the email list is tagged as a danger to the student body and consequently loses his job. Emily Raine and Owen grow closer and Owen takes her to a show, and they start to fall for one another. However, as they walk home Owen is surprised to receive an email from Emily and learns that her real name is actually "Amelie". He agrees to meet with her in a bar and they chat, but their conversation is stilted and awkward. As they start to bond, they are interrupted by people who recognise him as the viral "Email Guy". Realising their relationship will never work with the newfound scrutiny Owen has brought upon them both, Amelie and Owen part ways.

Meanwhile, Emily submits her project with hours to spare and attends a leavers' ball. She tries to admit she is fine without Owen. She breaks things off with her on-again off-again boyfriend Tristan and leaves to meet Owen, only to see him speaking with Amelie. She returns downbeat to her flat later, shocked to see Owen there. Owen had bumped into her roommate Anna. While waiting on Emily, he uncovers the notes for her final degree project and learns he's her case study. Disgusted and heartbroken, Owen walks out on her.

Emily sinks into a depression after seemingly losing Owen, but gets a good mark on her thesis. She decides after speaking to Anna to go on the same podcast that Owen went on to clear Owen's name. While being interviewed, she admits she was behind Owen's strange antics and she implores Owen to give her a chance and come to her dissertation. Emily uses her final presentation on the thesis to apologise to Owen, who walks out. Abandoning her presentation, Emily runs out to apologise to him face-to-face, which Owen finally accepts. The two share a kiss, confirming their feelings for each other.

== Cast ==
- Angourie Rice as Emily Raine
- Spike Fearn as Owen Brompton
- Minnie Driver as Dean
- Sadie Soverall as Fairy Emily (Amelie)
- Cora Kirk as Anna
- Jack Riddiford as Matt
- Isabella Laughland as Freya
- Yali Topol Margalith as Emily Palmer
- Kat Ronney as Emily Thewlis
- Phil Wang as Pervy Martin
- Timothy Innes as Tristan
- Nadia Parkes as Laura Lewis
- Prasanna Puwanarajah as Professor Westlake
- Amber Grappy as Rhea
- Anthony J. Abraham as Kyle
- Scarlett-Mai Grant
- Faye Campbell as Emily Dixon
- Tash Major as Emily Potts
- Carl Blakeley as AJ
- Julia Rogers as Emily Weston
- Trudy Akobeng as Emily Horsefield
- Fiona Allen as Receptionist
- Toby Rothwell as Caretaker
- Dalu Thebe as Dr. Abaje
- Emily Ash as Amy
- Nathan Foad as Jaded Nathan
- Hannah Greensmith
- Harry Trevaldwyn as Influencer

== Production ==
The film is directed by Alicia MacDonald, written by Rachel Hirons, and produced by Tim Bevan and Eric Fellner for Working Title Films. Olivier Kaempfer produced for Parkville. Focus Features has worldwide distribution rights.

The cast is led by Angourie Rice and Spike Fearn and also includes Minnie Driver and Cora Kirk. Principal photography took place in Manchester between August and September 2024.

== Release ==
Finding Emily premiered in Manchester on 12 May 2026, and was theatrically released in the United Kingdom on 22 May 2026, before being released in the United States on 28 August 2026.

== Reception ==
On the review aggregator website Rotten Tomatoes, 90% of 77 critics' reviews are positive, with an average rating of 7.0/10. The website's consensus reads: "A sparkling rom-com that satirizes modern social mores with good-natured wit and a lovely rapport between Angourie Rice and Spike Fearn, Finding Emily makes a tried-and-true formula feel brand new." Metacritic, which uses a weighted average, assigned the film a score of 60 out of 100, based on 24 critics, indicating "mixed or average" reviews.
