= Bad Genius (2024 film) =

- Theatrical release poster
- Directed by: J.C. Lee
- Screenplay by: J.C. Lee; Julius Onah
- Based on: Bad Genius by Nattawut Poonpiriya
- Produced by: Erik Feig; Ashley Stern; Jessica Switch; Patrick Wachsberger
- Starring: Benedict Wong; Callina Liang; Jabari Banks; Taylor Hickson; Sarah-Jane Redmond
- Cinematography: Brett Jutkiewicz
- Edited by: Franklin Peterson
- Music by: Marius de Vries; Matt Robertson
- Production companies: Little Ray Media; Picture Perfect Federation; Picturestart
- Distributed by: Vertical
- Release date: October 11, 2024
- Running time: 96 minutes
- Country: United States
- Language: English

Bad Genius is a 2024 American heist thriller film directed by J.C. Lee and co-written by Julius Onah. It is an English-language remake of the 2017 Thai film of the same name. It stars Benedict Wong, Callina Liang in her film debut, Jabari Banks, Taylor Hickson, and Sarah-Jane Redmond.

== Cast ==
- Benedict Wong as Meng, Lynn's father
- Callina Liang as Lynn, a genius girl and Meng's daughter
- Jabari Banks as Bank
- Taylor Hickson as Grace
- Sarah-Jane Redmond as Irene Walsh

== Plot Summary ==
Lynn Kang is a gifted Thai American high school student who receives a scholarship to an elite private school. After helping her classmate Grace cheat on a test, Lynn is approached by other students who offer to pay her for answers. Using her knowledge of music and finger movements from piano training, Lynn creates a covert code to signal correct responses during exams.

Demand increases, and Lynn expands the scheme with the help of another top student, Bank. Their cheating operation spreads across multiple classes and major standardized tests. As the stakes grow, tension develops between Lynn and Bank over money, ethics, and the consequences of being caught.

Suspicion from faculty and inconsistencies in exams lead to an investigation. The cheating network eventually collapses. Lynn’s scholarship is revoked, and her academic future becomes uncertain. The aftermath forces Lynn and Bank to confront the impact of their actions and the pressures that led them to cheat.

== Production ==
In May 2019, Erik Feig and Patrick Wachsberger announced that they were producing an English-language remake of the 2017 Thai film Bad Genius. It was originally to be written by Eva Anderson. In March 2023, they announced that J.C. Lee would be directing and co-writing the screenplay with Julius Onah. Benedict Wong, Callina Liang, Jabari Banks, Taylor Hickson, and Sarah-Jane Redmond rounded out the main cast. Principal photography began in May 2023.

== Release ==
Bad Genius was released in the United States by Vertical on October 11, 2024.

== Reception ==
On the review aggregator website Rotten Tomatoes, 72% of 18 critics' reviews are positive, with an average rating of 6.2/10.
