= Callina Liang =

Canadian actress (born 2000)

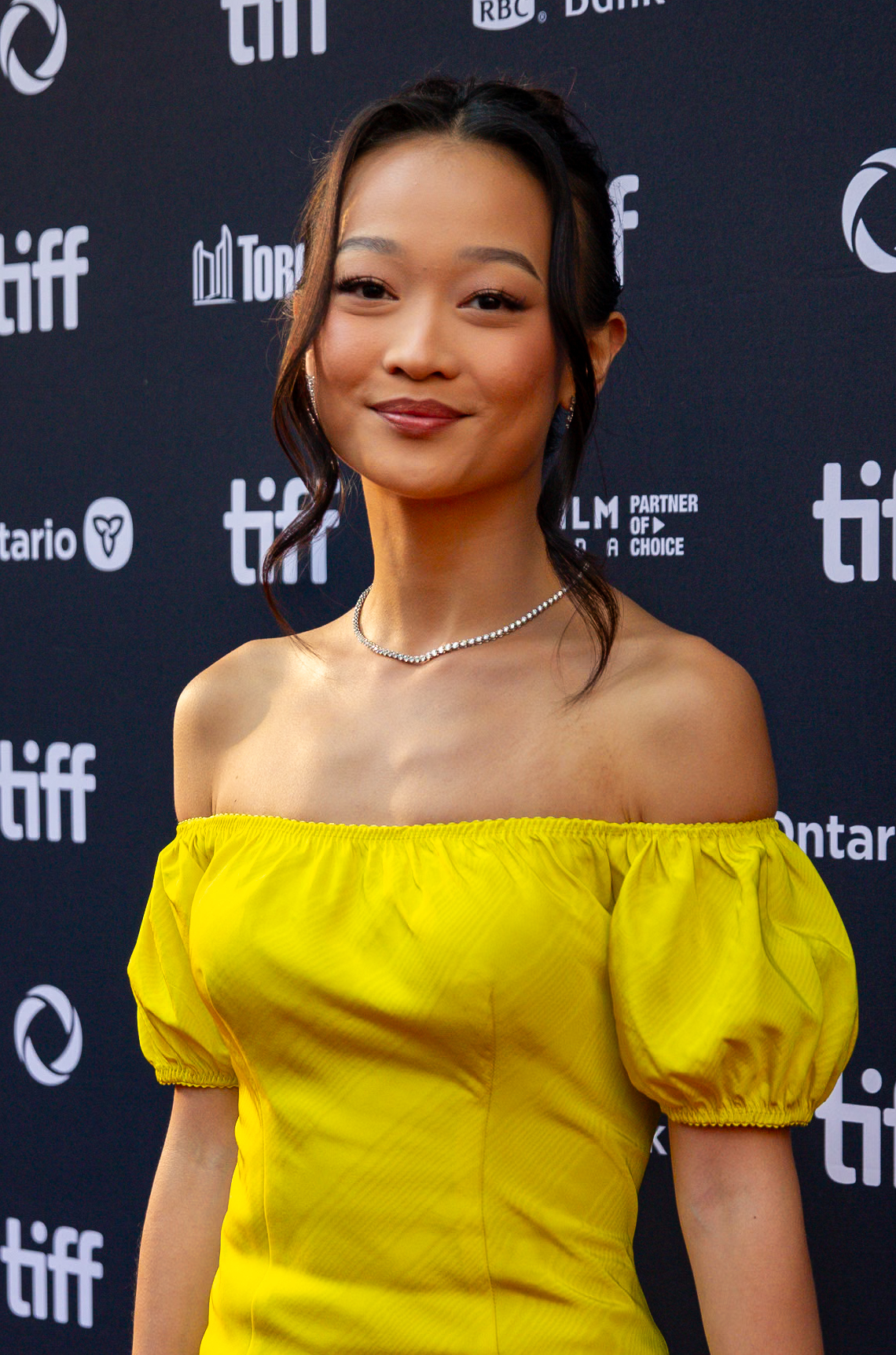
- Liang at the 2024 Toronto International Film Festival
- Born: May 14, 2000 (age 26); Vancouver, British Columbia, Canada
- Education: Lasalle College of the Arts
- Occupation: Actress
- Years active: 2022–present
- Notable work: Presence; Street Fighter

Callina Liang (born May 14, 2000) is a Canadian actress. Her films include Presence, Bad Genius (both 2024) and Street Fighter (2026). On television, she is known for her role in the ITVX teen drama Tell Me Everything (2022).

== Early life ==
Liang was born in Vancouver and grew up in Beijing, Sydney, and Singapore. She attended the Australian International School (AIS) in the latter, topping her IGCSEs in Drama whilst in Year 10. She went on to study Performance at Lasalle College of the Arts. Through her teenage years, she was a TikTok content creator.

== Career ==
Liang made her television debut as Mei in the first series of the ITVX teen drama Tell Me Everything which premiered in 2022.

In 2024, Liang starred in the film Presence by Steven Soderbergh. She also played a lead role in Bad Genius, a Thai directorial debut by J.C. Lee.

In June 2025, Liang was cast as Chun-Li in the Street Fighter reboot film. To prepare for her role, Liang trained daily in Taekwondo, Muay Thai, and Wushu for approximately two hours, focusing on leg strength. She adopted a rigorous bulking diet that involved consuming 12 eggs per day and eating every two hours, which she said made her nauseated. By the end of filming, each of her thighs had increased in size by 6.5 centimeters (2.6 in).

== Filmography ==
=== Film ===
Year	Title	Role	Notes
2024	Bad Genius	Lynn	
2024	Presence	Chloe Payne	
2026	Street Fighter	Chun-Li	

=== Television ===
Year	Title	Role	Notes
2022	Tell Me Everything	Mei	Main role (series 1)
2023	Foundation	Young Rue Corintha	1 episode
