= List of fictional doctors in television =

This is a list of fictional doctors (characters who use the appellation "doctor", medical and otherwise), organized by the television show and character's name.

== 0-9 ==
Program	Fictional doctor	Actor
3 lbs	Dr. Thomas Flores; Dr. Douglas Hanson; Dr. Adrienne Holland; Dr. Jonathan Seger	Armando Riesco; Stanley Tucci; Indira Varma; Mark Feuerstein
30 Rock	Dr. Leo Spaceman	Chris Parnell
3rd Rock from the Sun	Dr. Mary Albright; Dr. Richard Solomon	Jane Curtin; John Lithgow
7th Heaven	Dr. Matt Camden; Dr. Sarah Glass-Camden; Dr. Hank Hastings; Dr. Jonathan Sanders	Barry Watson; Sarah Danielle Madison; Ed Begley, Jr. Nick Zano

== A ==
Program	Fictional doctor	Actor
All My Children	Dr. Angie Baxter; Dr. David Hayward; Dr. Jonathan Kinder; Dr. Greg Madden; Dr. Josh Madden #1 #2; Dr. Jake Martin#1 #2; Dr. Jeff Martin #1 #2; Dr. Joe Martin; Dr. Maria Santos; Dr. Julia Santos Keefer; Dr. David Thornton; Dr. Charles Tyler; Dr. Cliff Warner	Debbi Morgan; Vincent Irizarry; Michael Sabatino; Ian Buchanan; Scott Kinworthy; Colin Egglesfield; Michael Lowry; J. Eddie Peck; Charles Frank; John James; Ray MacDonnell; Eva LaRue Callahan; Sydney Penny; Paul Gleason; Hugh Franklin; Peter Bergman
All Saints	Dr. Luciano "Luke" Forlano; Dr. Peter Morrison; Dr. Mitchell "Mitch" Stevens; Dr. Kylie Preece; Dr. Charlotte Beaumont; Dr. Vincent Hughes; Dr. Jack Quade; Dr. Frank Campion; Dr. Sean Everleigh; Dr. Bartholomew "Bart" West; Dr. Miklos "Mike" Vlasek; Dr. Zoe Gallagher; Dr. Steven "Steve" Taylor; Dr. Adam Rossi; Dr. Elliott Parker	Martin Lynes; Andrew McKaige; Erik Thomson; Ling-Hsueh Tang; Tammy MacIntosh; Christopher Gabardi; Wil Traval; John Howard; Chris Vance; Andrew Supanz; John Waters; Allison Cratchley; Jack Campbell; Kip Gamblin; Jonathan Wood
Allí abajo	Dr. Roberto "Rober" Almenar; Dr. Koldo Intxaustegi	Alfonso Sánchez; Gorka Aginagalde
Anger Management	Dr. Jordan Denby; Dr. Charles "Charlie" Goodson; Dr. Moore; Dr. Kate Wales; Dr. Randy Warren	Laura Bell Bundy; Charlie Sheen; Steve Valentine; Selma Blair; Michael Gross
Another World	Dr. Jamie Frame #1 #2 #3 #4 #5 #6 #7 #8; Dr. John Hudson; Dr. Kelsey Harrison	Seth Holzlein; Aiden McNulty; Tyler Mead; Brad Bedford; Robert Doran; Tim Holcomb; Richard Bekins; Laurence Lau; David Forsyth; Kaitlin Hopkins
Arrested Development	Dr. Fishman	Ian Roberts
Arrow	Dr. Ray Palmer	Brandon Routh

== B ==
Program	Fictional doctor	Actor
Babylon 5	Dr. Stephen Franklin; Dr. Benjamin Kyle	Richard Biggs; Johnny Sekka
Bad Girls	Dr. Malcolm Nicholson; Dr. Thomas Waugh; Dr. Rowan Dunlop	Philip McGough; Michael Higgs; Colin Salmon
Battlestar Galactica (1978); Battlestar Galactica (2003)	Dr. Salik; Dr. Gaius Baltar; Dr. Cottle	George Murdock; James Callis; Donnelly Rhodes
Becker	Dr. John Becker	Ted Danson
Bel Ami	Doctor	Geoffrey Lewis
Ben Casey	Dr. Ben Casey; Dr. Daniel Niles Freeland; Dr. David Zorba; Dr. Maggie Graham; Dr. Ted Hoffman	Vincent Edwards; Franchot Tone; Sam Jaffe; Bettye Ackerman; Harry Landers
The Beverly Hillbillies	Granny Clampett (mountain folk doctor); Dr. Roy Clyburn	Irene Ryan; Fred Clark
Beverly Hills, 90210	Dr. Peter Tucker	James C. Victor
Bewitched	Dr. Bombay	Bernard Fox
The Big Bang Theory	Dr. Stephanie Barnett; Dr. Kevin Campbell; Dr. Sheldon Cooper; Dr. Amy Farrah Fowler; Dr. Eric Gablehauser; Dr. Gallo; Dr. Alfred Hofstadter; Dr. Beverly Hofstadter; Dr. Leonard Hofstadter; Dr. Rajesh Koothrappali; Dr. V.M. Koothrappali; Dr. Barry Kripke; Dr. Oliver Lorvis; Dr. Greg Pemberton; Dr. Elizabeth Plimpton; Dr. Bernadette Maryann Rostenkowski-Wolowitz; Dr. Emily Sweeney; Dr. David Underhill; Dr. Leslie Winkle; Dr. Robert Wolcott	Sara Rue; Kal Penn; Jim Parsons; Mayim Bialik; Mark Harelik; Jane Kaczmarek; Judd Hirsch; Christine Baranski; Johnny Galecki; Kunal Nayyar; Brian George; John Ross Bowie; Billy Bob Thornton; Sean Astin; Judy Greer; Melissa Rauch; Laura Spencer; Michael Trucco; Sara Gilbert; Peter MacNicol
Blood Ties	Dr. Rajani Mohadevan	Nimet Kanji
The Bob Newhart Show	Dr. Robert "Bob" Hartley; Dr. Jerry Robinson	Bob Newhart; Peter Bonerz
Bodies	Dr. Maya Dutta; Dr. Polly Grey; Dr. Roger Hurley; Dr. Rob Lake; Dr. Maria Orton; Dr. Tim Sibley; Dr. Tony Whitman	Preeya Kalidas; Tamzin Malleson; Patrick Baladi; Max Beesley; Susan Lynch; Simon Lowe; Keith Allen
The Bold Ones: The New Doctors	Dr. David Craig; Dr. Amanda Fallon; Dr. Ben Gold; Dr. Gomrick; Dr. Paul Hunter; Dr. Ted Stuart	E. G. Marshall; Jane Wyman; Pat Hingle; John S. Ragin; David Hartman; John Saxon
Bones	Dr. Zack Addy; Dr. Temperance Brennan; Dr. Daniel Goodman; Dr. Jack Hodgins; Dr. Camille Saroyan; Dr. Lance Sweets	Eric Millegan; Emily Deschanel; Jonathan Adams; T. J. Thyne; Tamara Taylor; John Francis Daley
Bramwell	Dr. Eleanor Bramwell; Dr. Robert Bramwell	Jemma Redgrave; David Calder
Brilliant Minds	Dr. Oliver Wolf	Zachary Quinto
Buck Rogers in the 25th Century	Dr. Goodfellow; Dr. Elias Huer; Dr. Theopolis	Wilfrid Hyde-White; Tim O'Connor; Eric Server (voice)

== C ==
Program	Fictional doctor	Actor
Captain Kremmen	Dr. Heinrich von Gitfinger	Kenny Everett
Cardiac Arrest	Dr. Monica Broome; Dr. Andrew Collin; Dr. Claire Maitland; Dr. Rajesh Rajah	Pooky Quesnel; Andrew Lancel; Helen Baxendale; Ahsen Bhatti
El Caso. Crónica de sucesos	Dr. Rebeca Martín	Natalia Verbeke
Castle	Dr. Carver Burke; Dr. Josh Davidson; Dr. Lanie Parish; Dr. Sidney Perlmutter	Michael Dorn; Victor Webster; Tamala Jones; Arye Gross
Centro médico	Dr. Javier Blanco; Dr. Ainhoa Cortel; Dr. Hamman Dacaret; Dr. Jaime Ferrer; Dr. Diego Herranz; Dr. Matías Herrera; Dr. Rocío Jiménez; Dr. Ramón Landó; Dr. Silvia Marco; Dr. Álvaro Mendieta; Dr. Carlos Merino; Dr. Alberto Molina; Dr. Diana Ortega; Dr. Beatriz Reina; Dr. Marina Rey; Dr. Natalia Romero; Dr. Andrés Silva; Dr. Eva Soria; Dr. Andrea Soto; Dr. Ángela Vega; Dr. Lucía Velázquez	Jesús Cabrero; Cristina Llorente; Jordi Mestre; Christian Guiriguet; Fran Martínez; Xabier Murua; Ana Caldas; José Navar; Ana Cela; Octavi Pujades; Armando del Río; Jesús Olmedo; Rebeca Valls; María Cotiello; Rocío Anker; Marina Lozano; Óscar Ramos; Elena Furiase; Elvira Cuadrupani; María Isasi; Ana Villa
Cheers	Dr. Frasier Winslow Crane; Dr. Lilith Sternin	Kelsey Grammer; Bebe Neuwirth
Chicago Hope	Dr. Francesca Alberghetti; Dr. Kate Austin; Dr. Lisa Catera; Dr. Jeffrey Geiger; Dr. Angela Giandamenicio; Dr. Diane Grad; Dr. Dennis Hancock; Dr. Jeremy Hanlon; Dr. Billy Kronk; Dr. Jack McNeil; Dr. Danny Nyland; Dr. Gina Simon; Dr. Aaron Shutt; Dr. John Sutton; Dr. Arthur Thurmond; Dr. Phillip Watters; Dr. Keith Wilkes; Dr. Robert Yeates	Barbara Hershey; Christine Lahti; Stacy Edwards; Mandy Patinkin; Roma Maffia; Jayne Brook; Vondie Curtis-Hall; Lauren Holly; Peter Berg; Mark Harmon; Thomas Gibson; Carla Gugino; Adam Arkin; Jamey Sheridan; E.G. Marshall; Hector Elizondo; Rocky Carroll; Eric Stoltz
Chicago Med	Dr. Will Halstead; Dr. Natalie Manning; Dr. Sarah Reese; Dr. Connor Rhodes; Dr. Ethan Choi; Dr. Samantha Zanetti; Dr. Noah Sexton; Dr. Sam Abrams; Dr. David Downey; Dr. Isidore Latham; Dr. Ava Bekker; Dr. Robyn Charles; Dr. Stanley Stohl; Dr. Charles Daniels	Nick Gehlfuss; Torrey DeVitto; Rachel DiPillo; Colin Donnell; Brian Tee; Julie Berman; Roland Buck III; Brennan Brown; Gregg Henry; Ato Essandoh; Norma Kuhling; Mekia Cox; Eddie Jemison; Oliver Platt
Chicago Story	Dr. Judith Bergstrom; Dr. Max Carson; Dr. Jeff House	Maud Adams; Kristoffer Tabori; Kene Holliday
China Beach	Dr. Gerard Bernard; Dr. Dee; Dr. Dick Richard; Dr. Colleen Flaherty Richards; Dr. Singer	Derek de Lint; Richard Green; Robert Picardo; Colleen Flynn; Scott Jaeck
City Hospital	Dr. Barton Crane; Dr. Kate Morrow	Mel Ruick; Anne Burr
City of Angels	Dr. Nate Ambrose; Dr. Damon Bradley; Dr. Ethan Carter; Dr. Courtney Ellis; Dr. Arthur Jackson; Dr. Gwen Pennington; Dr. Lillian Price; Dr. Dan Prince; Dr. Raleigh Stewart; Dr. Ana Syphax; Dr. Ben Turner; Dr. Geoffrey Weiss; Dr. Wesley Williams	Gregory Alan Williams; Bokeem Woodbine; Ron Canada; Gabrielle Union; T. E. Russell; Sandi Schultz; Vivica A. Fox; Robert Foxworth; Kyle Secor; Tamara Taylor; Blair Underwood; Phil Buckman; Hill Harper
The Closer	Dr. Morales; Dr. Jerome	Jonathan Del Arco; Mark Feuerstein
The Colbert Report	Dr. Stephen T. Colbert, D.F.A. (honorary)	Stephen Colbert
The Cosby Show	Dr. Heathcliff "Cliff" Huxtable	Bill Cosby
Crazy Ex-Girlfriend	Dr. Davit Akopian; Dr. Noelle Akopian; Dr. Daniel Shin	Piter Marek; Michael Hyatt; Jay Hayden
Criminal Minds	Dr. Spencer Reid; Dr. Alex Blake; Dr. Tara Lewis	Matthew Gray Gubler; Jeanne Tripplehorn; Aisha Tyler
Crossing Jordan	Dr. Jordan Cavanaugh; Dr. Garret Macy; Dr. Nigel Townsend; Dr. Peter Winslow; Dr. Miles Marks	Jill Hennessy; Miguel Ferrer; Steve Valentine; Ivan Sergei; Mark Moses
Crusade	Dr. Sara Chambers	Marjean Holden
CSI: Crime Scene Investigation	Dr. Gilbert "Gil" Grissom; Dr. Albert "Al" Robbins; Dr. Dr. Leigh Sapien	William Petersen; Robert David Hall; Brenda Strong
CSI: Miami	Dr. Alexx Woods	Khandi Alexander
CSI: NY	Dr. Peyton Driscoll; Dr. Sid Hammerback; Dr. Sheldon Hawkes	Claire Forlani; Robert Joy; Hill Harper
Curb Your Enthusiasm	Dr. Shiela Flomm	Brenda Strong

== D ==
Program	Fictional doctor	Actor
Daktari	Dr. Marsh Tracy	Marshall Thompson
Dark Shadows	Dr. Peter Guthrie; Dr. Julia Hoffman; Dr. Eric Lange; Dr. Ian Reade; Dr. Dave Woodward #1 #2 #3	John Lasell; Grayson Hall; Addison Powell; Alfred Hinckley; Richard Woods; Robert Gerringer; Peter Turgeon
Days of Our Lives	Dr. Karen Bader; Dr. Lexie Carver; Dr. Marlena Evans; Dr. Tom Horton; Dr. Mike Horton #1 #2	Tammy Tavares; Renée Jones; Deidre Hall; Macdonald Carey; Michael T. Weiss; Roark Critchlow
Descendants of the Sun	Dr. Kang Mo-yeon	Song Hye-kyo
Desperate Housewives	Dr. Lee Craig; Dr. Jane Carlson; Dr. Alex Cominis; Dr. Samuel Heller; Dr. Adam Mayfair; Dr. Ron McCready; Dr. Rex Van de Kamp; Dr. Mary Wagner	Terry Bozeman; Andrea Parker; Todd Grinnell; Stephen Spinella; Nathan Fillion; Jay Harrington; Steven Culp; Nancy Travis
Diagnosis: Murder	Dr. Amanda Bentley; Dr. Jack Parker; Dr. Mark Sloan; Dr. Jack Stewart; Dr. Jesse Travis	Victoria Rowell; Stephen Caffrey; Dick Van Dyke; Scott Baio; Charlie Schlatter
The Dick Van Dyke Show	Dr. Jerry Helper	Jerry Paris
Doc Martin	Dr. Martin Ellingham	Martin Clunes
Doctor Doctor	Dr. Dierdre Bennett; Dr. Abraham Butterfield; Dr. Grant Linowitz; Dr. Mike Stratford	Maureen Mueller; Julius Carry; Beau Gravitte; Matt Frewer
The Doctor Blake Mysteries	Dr. Lucien Blake	Craig McLachlan
Doctor Mateo	Dr. Mateo Sancristóbal	Gonzalo de Castro
Doctor Odyssey	Dr. Max Bankman	Joshua Jackson
Doctor-X: Surgeon Michiko Daimon	Dr. Michiko Daimon	Ryōko Yonekura
Doctors	See list	Various
Dr. Finlay's Casebook	Dr. Cameron; Dr. Finlay; Dr. Snoddy	Andrew Cruickshank; Bill Simpson; Eric Woodburn
Dr. Horrible's Sing-Along Blog	Dr. Horrible	Neil Patrick Harris
Dr. Katz, Professional Therapist	Dr. Jonathan Katz	Jonathan Katz
Dr. Kildare	Dr. Yates Atkinson; Dr. Maxwell Becker; Dr. Jeff Brenner; Dr. Vincent Brill; Dr. Demerest; Dr. Rudy Devereux; Dr. Phillip Downey; Dr. Roger Helvick; Dr. James Kildare; Dr. Carl Noyes; Dr. Milton Orliff; Dr. Lou Rush; Dr. Wickens	James Callahan; James Mason; Bruce Hyde; Mart Hulswit; Barry Atwater; Dean Stockwell; Dan O'Herlihy; Andrew Prine; Richard Chamberlain; William Shatner; Martin Balsam; James Earl Jones; Philip Bourneuf
Dr. Quinn, Medicine Woman	Dr. Michaela "Mike" Quinn	Jane Seymour
Dr. Vegas	Dr. Billy Grant	Rob Lowe
Doctor Who & Torchwood	The Doctor - First Doctor; Second Doctor; Third Doctor; Fourth Doctor; Fifth Doctor; Sixth Doctor; Seventh Doctor; Eighth Doctor; War Doctor; Ninth Doctor; Tenth Doctor; Next Doctor; Eleventh Doctor; Twelfth Doctor; Thirteenth Doctor; Fourteenth Doctor; Fifteenth Doctor; Fugitive Doctor; Dr. Chang; Dr. Constantine; Dr. Grace Holloway; Dr. Owen Harper; Dr. Martha Jones; Dr. Vera Juarez; Dr. Kahler-Jex; Dr. Moon; Dr. Rupesh Patanjali; Dr. Toshiko Sato; Liz Shaw; Dr. River Song; Dr. Harry Sullivan; Dr. Tanizaki; Dr. Rory Williams	William Hartnell; Patrick Troughton; Jon Pertwee; Tom Baker; Peter Davison; Colin Baker; Sylvester McCoy; Paul McGann; John Hurt; Christopher Eccleston; David Tennant; David Morrissey; Matt Smith; Peter Capaldi; Jodie Whittaker; David Tennant; Ncuti Gatwa; Jo Martin; Andrew Cheung; Richard Wilson; Daphne Ashbrook; Burn Gorman; Freema Agyeman; Arlene Tur; Adrian Scarborough; Colin Salmon; Rik Makarem; Naoko Mori; Caroline John; Alex Kingston; Ian Marter; Togo Igawa; Arthur Darvill
Doctors' Hospital	Dr. Anson Brooks; Dr. Chaffey; Dr. Danvers; Dr. Jake Goodwin; Dr. Paul Herman; Dr. Felipe Ortega; Dr. Norah Purcell	James Almanzar; Russell Martin; John Pleshette; George Peppard; John Larroquette; Victor Campos; Zohra Lampert
Dollhouse	Dr. Nolan Kinard; Dr. Makido; Dr. Saunders; Dr. Claire Saunders	Vincent Ventresca; Clyde Kusatsu; Joe Howard; Amy Acker
Doogie Howser, M.D.	Dr. Canfield; Dr. David Howser; Dr. Douglas "Doogie" Howser; Dr. Jack McGuire; Dr. Pinkley; Dr. Ron Welch	Lawrence Pressman; James Sikking; Neil Patrick Harris; Mitchell Anderson; Susan Krebs; Rif Hutton
Downton Abbey	Dr. Richard Clarkson; Sir Philip Tapsell	David Robb; Tim Pigott-Smith

== E ==
Program	Fictional doctor	Actor
EastEnders	Dr. Oliver Cousins; Dr. Fred Fonseca; Dr. Al Jenkins; Dr. Yusef Khan; Dr. Harold Legg; Dr. Johnathon Leroy; Dr. Poppy Merritt; Dr. David Samuels; Dr. Jaggat Singh; Dr. Anthony Trueman; Dr. May Wright; Dr. Ash Kaur	Ivan Kaye; Jimi Mistry; Adam Croasdell; Ace Bhatti; Leonard Fenton; Tom Ellis; Amy Darcy; Christopher Reich; Amerjit Deu; Nicholas Bailey; Amanda Drew; Gurlaine Kaur Garcha
The Edge of Night	Dr. Hugh Campbell; Dr. Miles Cavanaugh; Dr. Jim Fields; Dr. Quentin Henderson; Dr. Hugh Lacey; Dr. Katherine Lovell; Dr. Chris Neely; Dr. Gus Norwood	Wesley Addy; Joel Crothers; Alan Feinstein; Michael Stroka; Brooks Rogers; Mary Fickett; Douglas Werner; Wyman Pendleton
Emergency!	Dr. Kelly Brackett; Dr. Joe Early; Dr. Mike Morton	Robert Fuller; Bobby Troup; Ron Pinkard
Emergency - Ward 10	Dr. Alan "Digger" Dawson	Bud Tingwell
Emily Owens, M.D.	Dr. Jamie Albagetti; Dr. A.J. Aquino; Dr. Micah Barnes; Dr. Gina Bandari; Dr. Will Collins; Dr. Tim Dupre; Dr. Tyra Dupre; Dr. Kelly Hamata; Dr. Cassandra Kopelson; Dr. Kyle Putnam; Dr. Emily Owens	Mark Ghanimé; J. R. Ramirez; Michael Rady; Necar Zadegan; Justin Hartley; Harry Lennix; Kelly McCreary; Brittany Ishibashi; Aja Naomi King; Ian Anthony Dale; Mamie Gummer
Empty Nest	Dr. Harry Weston	Richard Mulligan
ER	Dr. Donald Anspaugh; Dr. Alexander Babcock; Dr. Ray Barnett; Dr. Peter Benton; Dr. Charles Cameron; Dr. John Carter; Dr. Jing-Mei "Deb" Chen; Dr. Janet Coburn; Dr. David "Div" Cvetic; Dr. Victor Clemente; Dr. Elizabeth Corday; Dr. Anna Del Amico; Dr. Carl Deraad; Dr. Maggie Doyle; Dr. Dale Edson; Dr. Cleo Finch; Dr. Greg Fischer; Dr. Steve Flint; Dr. Michael Gallant; Dr. Dennis Gant; Dr. Tony Gates; Dr. Mark Greene; Dr. George Henry; Dr. Angela Hicks; Dr. Jack Kayson; Dr. Abby Keaton; Dr. Lucy Knight; Dr. Luka Kovač; Dr. Gabriel Lawrence; Dr. Kim Legaspi; Dr. Susan Lewis; Dr. Abby Lockhart; Dr. Dave Malucci; Dr. Paul Meyers; Dr. David Morgenstern; Dr. Archie Morris; Dr. Nina Pomerantz; Dr. Greg Pratt; Dr. Neela Rasgotra; Dr. Robert 'Rocket' Romano; Dr. Doug Ross; Dr. William "Wild Willy" Swift; Dr. John "Tag" Taglieri; Dr. Harper Tracy; Dr. Carl Vucelich; Dr. Kerry Weaver; Dr. Ellis West	John Aylward; David Brisbin; Shane West; Eriq La Salle; Steven Culp; Noah Wyle; Ming-Na; Amy Aquino; John Terry; John Leguizamo; Alex Kingston; Maria Bello; John Doman; Jorja Fox; Matthew Glave; Michael Michele; Harry J. Lennix; Scott Jaeck; Sharif Atkins; Omar Epps; John Stamos; Anthony Edwards; Chad Lowe; C.C.H. Pounder; Sam Anderson; Glenne Headly; Kellie Martin; Goran Visnjic; Alan Alda; Elizabeth Mitchell; Sherry Stringfield; Maura Tierney; Erik Palladino; Michael Buchman Silver; William H. Macy; Scott Grimes; Jami Gertz; Mekhi Phifer; Parminder Nagra; Paul McCrane; George Clooney; Michael Ironside; Rick Rossovich; Christine Elise; Ron Rifkin; Laura Innes; Clancy Brown
E/R	Dr. Thomas Esquivel; Dr. Ravi Raja; Dr. Howard Sheinfeld; Dr. Eve Sheridan #1 #2	Luis Avalos; Henry Polic II; Elliott Gould; Marcia Strassman; Mary McDonnell
Everwood	Dr. Harold "Hal" Abbott, Jr. Dr. Linda Abbott; Dr. Andrew "Andy" Brown	Tom Amandes; Marcia Cross; Treat Williams

== F ==
Program	Fictional doctor	Actor
Farscape	Utu-Noranti Pralatong (herbalist); Pa'u Zotoh Zhaan (spiritual healer)	Melissa Jaffer; Virginia Hey
Firefly	Dr. Simon Tam	Sean Maher
The Flash	Dr. Henry Allen; Dr. Christina McGee; Dr. Ray Palmer; Dr. Caitlin Snow; Dr. Harrison Wells	John Wesley Shipp; Amanda Pays; Brandon Routh; Danielle Panabaker; Tom Cavanagh
The Flying Doctors	Dr. Tom Callaghan; Dr. Chris Randall; Dr. Geoff Standish	Andrew McFarlane; Liz Burch; Robert Grubb
Forever	Dr. Henry Morgan	Ioan Gruffudd
Forever Knight	Dr. Natalie Lambert	Catherine Disher
Frasier	Dr. Frasier Crane; Dr. Hester Crane; Dr. Niles Crane; Dr. Lilith Sternin	Kelsey Grammer; Rita Wilson; David Hyde Pierce; Bebe Neuwirth
Fresh Off the Boat	Marvin Ellis, D.D.S.	Ray Wise
Friends	Dr. Richard Burke; Dr. Timothy Burke; Dr. Ross Geller; Dr. Leonard Green; Dr. Benjamin Hobart; Dr. Long; Dr. Drake Ramoray ("Days of Our Lives")	Tom Selleck; Michael Vartan; David Schwimmer; Ron Leibman; Greg Kinnear; Amanda Carlin; Joey Tribbiani (Matt LeBlanc)
Fringe	Dr. Walter Bishop	John Noble
Frontier Doctor	Dr. Bill Baxter	Rex Allen
The Fugitive; The Fugitive (remake)	Dr. Richard Kimble	David Janssen; Tim Daly
Futurama	Dr. Hubert J. Farnsworth; Dr. Ogden Wernstrom; Dr. John Zoidberg	Billy West (voice); David Herman (voice); Billy West (voice)

== G ==
Program	Fictional doctor	Actor
General Hospital	Dr. Rachel Adair; Dr. Tracy Adams; Dr. Addison; Dr. Dean Arnold; Dr. Bob Ayres; Dr. Alex Baker; Dr. Gail Adamson Baldwin; Dr. Tom Baldwin, Jr. Dr. Tom Baldwin, Sr. #1 #2; Dr. Michael Baranski; Dr. Walt Benson; Dr. Yasmine Bernoudi; Dr. Borden; Dr. Borez; Dr. Kyle Bradley; Dr. Arthur Bradshaw; Dr. Phil Brewer #1 #2 #3 #4; Dr. Ellen Burgess; Dr. Ellen Cahill; Dr. Mason Caldwell; Dr. Campbell; Dr. Yank Chung; Dr. Ryan Chamberlain; Dr. Collins; Dr. Kevin Collins; Dr. Vivian Collins; Dr. Cunningham; Dr. Mark Dante #1 #2 #3; Dr. Harrison Davis; Dr. Noah Drake; Dr. Patrick Drake; Dr. Diane Erskin; Dr. Irma Foster; Dr. Russell Ford; Dr. Gary; Dr. Goodman; Dr. Simone Ravella Hardy #1 #2 #3; Dr. Steve Hardy; Dr. Tom Hardy #1 #2; Dr. Tommy Hardy, Jr. Dr. Gerald Henderson; Dr. James Hobart; Dr. Greta Ingstrom; Dr. James; Dr. Andrew "Frisco" Jones; Dr. Anthony "Tony" Jones; Dr. Seymour Katz; Dr. Kramer; Dr. Lane; Dr. Gary Lansing; Dr. Gina Dante Lansing #1 #2 #3; Dr. Kelly Lee #1 #2; Dr. Todd Levine; Dr. Cameron Lewis; Dr. Jake Marshak; Dr. Ken Martin; Dr. Miller; Dr. Kyle Morgan; Dr. Erna Morris; Dr. Nelson; Dr. Kevin O’Connor; Dr. Joseph Parnell Scanlon; Dr. Tony Perelli; Dr. Perry; Dr. Henry Pinkham; Dr. Porchenko; Dr. John Prentice; Dr. Alan Quartermaine, Sr. Dr. Emily Quartermaine #1 #2; Dr. Monica Quartermaine #1 #2; Dr. Julie Morris Devlin Ramsey; Dr. Pauline Ravelle; Dr. Robin Scorpio; Dr. Malcolm Rutledge; Dr. Silva; Dr. Eric Simpson; Dr. Adam Streeter; Dr. Buzz Stryker; Dr. Peter Taylor #1 #2; Dr. Tremaine; Dr. Wallace; Dr. Jeff Webber; Dr. Lesley Williams Webber; Dr. Rick Webber #1 #2; Dr. Sarah Webber #1 #2; Dr. Steven Lars Webber #2; Dr. Bunny Willis; Dr. Lainey Winters; Dr. Wyatt	Amy Grabow; Kim Hamilton; Richard Guthrie; James Emery; Yale Summers; Philip Abbott; Susan Brown; Bradley Green; Don Chastain; David Wallace; Leigh McCloskey; Corey Young; Lydie Denier; Basil Langton; Victor Mohica; Daniel Black; Martin E. Brooks; Roy Thinnes; Ron Hayes; Craig Huebing; Martin West; Debbi Morgan; Marilyn Rockafellow; Joe Michael Burke; Chris Cavy; Patrick Francis Bishop; Jon Lindstrom; Chris Bart; Jon Lindstrom; Marie Windsor; Frank Whiteman; James York; Michael Delano; Gerald Gordon; Kevin Best; Rick Springfield; Jason Thompson; Brandyn Barbara Artis; Dwan Smith; Richard Gant; Michael Ensign; Bill Bishop; Laura Carrington; Stephanie Williams; Felecia Bell; John Beradino; Christine Cahill; Matthew Ashford; Zachary Ellington; Joe DiSanti; James Sikking; Kristina Wayborn; Rosemary Forsyth; Jack Wagner; Brad Maule; Jordan Charney; Cathy Masamitsu; Suzanne Cortney; Steve Carlson; Anna Stuart; Brenda Scott; Donna Baccala; Gwendoline Yeo; Minae Noji; Craig Littler; Lane Davies; Rib Hillis; Jack Betts; Edward Platt; Grainger Hines; Angel Tompkins; Pat Renella; Kevin Bernhardt; Michael Dietz; Michael Baseleon; Gene Collins; Peter Kilman; Philip Bruns; Barry Atwater; Stuart Damon; Amber Tamblyn; Natalia Livingston; Patsy Rahn; Leslie Charleson; Lisa Ann Hadley; Norma Donaldson; Kimberly McCullough; John Denos; William Marquez; Brandon Hooper; Brett Halsey; Don Galloway; Paul Carr; Craig Huebing; William Glover; Liam Sullivan; Richard Dean Anderson; Denise Alexander; Michael Gregory; Chris Robinson; Jennifer Sky; Sarah Laine; Shaun Benson; Scott Reeves; Beau Kayser; Kent King; Al Micacchio
General Hospital: Night Shift	Dr. Andy Archer; Dr. Leo Julian	Ron Melendez; Dominic Rains
Ghost Whisperer	Dr. Jim Clancy; Dr. Rick Payne; Dr. Eli James; Dr. Forrest Morgan	David Conrad; Jay Mohr; Jamie Kennedy; Mark Moses
Gideon's Crossing	Dr. Aaron Boies; Dr. Max Cabranes; Dr. Bruce Cherry; Dr. Wyatt Cooper; Dr. Ben Gideon; Dr. Alejandra "Ollie" Klein; Dr. Michael Pirandello; Dr. Siddhartha "Sid" Shandar	Russell Hornsby; Rubén Blades; Hamish Linklater; Eric Dane; Andre Braugher; Rhona Mitra; Kevin J. O'Connor; Ravi Kapoor
The Glades	Dr. Ben Avery; Dr. William Grant	Coby Ryan McLaughlin; Richard Burgi
The Good Doctor	Dr. Marcus Andrews; Dr. Claire Browne; Dr. Aaron Glassman; Dr. Jared Kalu; Dr. Elle McLean; Dr. Neil Melendez; Dr. Shaun Murphy; Dr. Morgan Reznick	Hill Harper; Antonia Thomas; Richard Schiff; Chuku Modu; Irene Keng; Nicholas Gonzalez; Freddie Highmore; Fiona Gubelmann
Great Performances	Dr. Fawcett; Dr. Cukrowicz	John Houseman; Rob Lowe
Green Wing	Dr. Angela Hunter; Dr. Guy Secretan; Dr. Caroline Todd; Dr. "Mac" Macartney; Dr. Alan Statham	Sarah Alexander; Stephen Mangan; Tamsin Greig; Julian Rhind-Tutt; Mark Heap
Grey's Anatomy	Dr. Miranda Bailey; Dr. Preston Burke; Dr. Ellis Grey; Dr. Lexie Grey; Dr. Meredith Grey; Dr. Alex Karev; Dr. Addison Montgomery; Dr. George O'Malley; Dr. Dr. Parker; Dr. Derek Shepherd; Dr. Mark Sloan; Dr. Isobel "Izzie" Stevens; Dr. Callie Torres; Dr. Richard Webber; Dr. Katharine Wyatt; Dr. Cristina Yang; Dr. Arizona Robbins; Dr. Erica Hahn; Dr. Swender; Dr. Virginia Dixon; Dr. Owen Hunt; Dr. April Kepner; Dr. Jackson Avery	Chandra Wilson; Isaiah Washington; Kate Burton; Chyler Leigh; Ellen Pompeo; Justin Chambers; Kate Walsh; T. R. Knight; Steven Culp; Patrick Dempsey; Eric Dane; Katherine Heigl; Sara Ramirez; James Pickens, Jr. Amy Madigan; Sandra Oh; Jessica Capshaw; Brooke Smith; Kimberly Elise; Mary McDonnell; Kevin McKidd; Sarah Drew; Jesse Williams
Guiding Light	Dr. Ed Bauer; Dr. Melissande Bauer; Dr. Rick Bauer; Dr. Michael Burke; Dr. Sonni Carrera; Dr. Eve Guthrie; Dr. Sara McIntyre; Dr. Daniel St. John; Dr. Claire Ramsey; Dr. Meredith Reade Bauer; Dr. Jim Reardon	Peter Simon; Yvonne Wright; Michael O'Leary; Peter Hermann; Michelle Forbes; Hilary Edson; Millette Alexander; David Bishins; Susan Pratt; Nicolette Goulet; Michael Woods
Gunsmoke	Dr. Galen "Doc" Adams; Dr. Charles Adams	Milburn Stone (television); Howard McNear (radio)

== H ==
Program	Fictional doctor	Actor
Hart of Dixie	Dr. Zoe Hart	Rachel Bilson
Having Babies aka Julie Farr, M.D.	Dr. Ron Danvers; Dr. Julie Farr; Dr. Blake Simmons	Dennis Howard; Susan Sullivan; Mitchell Ryan
Heartbeat	Dr. Casey Callahan; Dr. Forester; Dr. Myron Hackett; Dr. Pierce Harrison; Dr. Alexandra Panttiere; Dr. Jesse Shane; Dr. Millicent Silvano	Jamie Kennedy; JLouis Mills; D. L. Hughley; Dave Annable; Melissa George; Don Hany; Shelley Conn
Heartland	Dr. Nathaniel "Nate" Grant; Dr. Simon Griffith; Dr. Tom Jonas	Treat Williams; Chris William Martin; Rockmond Dunbar
Home and Away	Dr. Charlotte Adams; Dr. Rachel Armstrong; Dr. Diana Fraser; Dr. James Fraser; Dr. Lachlan Fraser; Dr. Flynn Saunders; Dr. Hugh Sullivan; Dr. Kelly Watson; Dr. Sid Walker	Stephanie Chaves-Jacobsen; Amy Mathews; Kerry McGuire; Michael Picciliri; Richard Grieve; Martin Dingle-Wall; Rodger Corser; Katrina Hobbs; Robert Mammone
Hope & Faith	Dr. Charley Shanowski; Dr. Anne Osvath	Ted McGinley; Jaclyn Smith
House	Dr. Allison Cameron; Dr. Robert Chase; Dr. Rowan Chase; Dr. Lisa Cuddy; Dr. Eric Foreman; Dr. Gregory House; Dr. Lawrence Kutner; Dr. Chris Taub; Dr. Remy Hadley; Dr. James Wilson	Jennifer Morrison; Jesse Spencer; Patrick Bauchau; Lisa Edelstein; Omar Epps; Hugh Laurie; Kal Penn; Peter Jacobson; Olivia Wilde; Robert Sean Leonard
House Calls	Dr. Charley Michaels; Dr. Norman Solomon; Dr. Amos Weatherby	Wayne Rogers; Ray Buktenica; David Wayne
How I Met Your Mother	Dr. Sonya; Dr. John Stangel (Barney's doppelgänger); Dr. Kevin Venkataraghavan; Dr. Stella Zinman	Vicki Lewis; Neil Patrick Harris; Kal Penn; Sarah Chalke

== I ==
Program	Fictional doctor	Actor
I Dream of Jeannie	Dr. Alfred E. Bellows	Hayden Rorke
In Treatment	Dr. Laura Hill	Melissa George
Inconceivable	Dr. Malcolm Bowers; Dr. Nora Campbell	Jonathan Cake; Angie Harmon
The Interns	Dr. Peter Goldstone	Broderick Crawford
Island Son	Dr. Daniel Kulani	Richard Chamberlain

== J ==
Program	Fictional doctor	Actor
Jekyll	Dr. Tom Jackman	James Nesbitt
Jericho	Dr. April Green	Darby Stanchfield
Julia	Dr. Morton Chegley	Lloyd Nolan

== L ==
Program	Fictional doctor	Actor
L. A. Doctors	Dr. Roger Cattan; Dr. Sarah Church; Dr. Tim Lonner; Dr. Evan Newman	Ken Olin; Sheryl Lee; Matt Craven; Rick Roberts
The Lady's Companion	Dr. Aguilar	Sergio Pozo
Law & Order; Law & Order: Special Victims Unit; Law & Order: Criminal Intent	Dr. Elizabeth Olivet; Dr. Elizabeth Rodgers; Dr. Emil Skoda; Dr. Melinda Warner	Carolyn McCormick; Leslie Hendrix; J. K. Simmons; Tamara Tunie
Lie to Me	Dr. Gillian Foster; Dr. Cal Lightman	Kelli Williams; Tim Roth
Light of Cloudy Day	Dr. Tien-shih Li	Chang Yen-ming
Little House on the Prairie	Dr. Hiram Baker	Kevin Hagen
LOST	Dr. Richard Alpert; Dr. Leslie Arzt; Dr. Juliet Burke; Dr. Ethan Rom; Dr. Christian Shephard; Dr. Jack Shephard	Nestor Carbonell; Daniel Roebuck; Elizabeth Mitchell; William Mapother; John Terry; Matthew Fox
Lost in Space	Dr. Maureen Robinson; Dr. Zachary Smith	June Lockhart; Jonathan Harris
The Love Boat	Dr. Adam Bricker	Bernie Kopell
The Lying Game	Dr. Ted Mercer	Andy Buckley

== M ==
Program	Fictional doctor	Actor
Marcus Welby, M.D.	Dr. Steven Kiley; Dr. Marcus Welby	James Brolin; Robert Young
M* A* S* H	LTC Henry Blake; MAJ Frank Burns; MAJ Sidney Freedman; CPT B. J. Hunnicutt; CPT Oliver Harmon "Spearchucker" Jones; CPT "Trapper" John Francis Xavier McIntyre; CPT Benjamin Franklin "Hawkeye" Pierce; COL Sherman T. Potter; MAJ Charles Emerson Winchester III	McLean Stevenson; Larry Linville; Allan Arbus; Mike Farrell; Timothy Brown; Wayne Rogers; Alan Alda; Harry Morgan; David Ogden Stiers
Matt Lincoln	Dr. Matt Lincoln	Vince Edwards
Maude	Dr. Arthur Harmon	Conrad Bain
Medic	Dr. Konrad Styner	Richard Boone
Medical Center	Dr. Jeanne Bartlett; Dr. Carrie Benson; Dr. Bradford; Dr. Corelli; Dr. Courtney; Dr. Farring; Dr. Joe Gannon; Dr. De Haven; Dr. James; Dr. Arthur Komer; Dr. Paul Lochner; Dr. Bert Simon; Dr. Ben Teverley; Dr. Waltham; Dr. Carl Webson	Corinne Camacho; Jessica Walter; Martin Braddock; Robert Walden; Peter Haskell; Pat Hingle; Chad Everett; Percy Rodriguez; Georg Stanford Brown; David Opatoshu; James Daly; Jack Garner; Paul Burke; William Devane; Gary Lockwood
Medical Investigation	Dr. Stephen Connor; Dr. Natalie Durant; Dr. Miles McCabe	Neal McDonough; Kelli Williams; Christopher Gorham
Medical Police	Dr. Lola Spratt Dr. Owen Maestro	Erinn Hayes Rob Huebel
Médico de familia	Dr. Ignacio "Nacho" Martín; Dr. Laura Mengíbar; Dr. Marta Sena	Emilio Aragón; Paula Sebastián; Mónica Aragón
Melrose Place	Dr. Michael Mancini; Dr. Kimberly Shaw; Dr. Matt Fielding	Thomas Calabro; Marcia Cross; Doug Savant
Mental	Dr. Chloe Artis; Dr. Carl Belle; Dr. Jack Gallagher; Dr. Veronica Hayden-Jones; Dr. Nora Skoff; Dr. Arturo Suarez	Marisa Ramirez; Derek Webster; Chris Vance; Jacqueline McKenzie; Annabella Sciorra; Nicholas Gonzalez
Mercy Point	Dr. Batung; Dr. Dru Breslauer; Dr. Haylen Breslauer; Dr. Rema Cook; Dr. DeMilla; Dr. Caleb "C.J." Jurado; Dr. Grote Maxwell	Jordan Lund; Alexandra Wilson; Maria del Mar; Gay Thomas; Joe Spano; Brian McNamara; Joe Morton
Metalocalypse	Dr. Rockso, the Rock N Roll Clown	Tommy Blacha (voice)
Miami Medical	Dr. Dr. Chris 'C' Deleo; Dr. Matthew Proctor; Dr. Serena Warren; Dr. Eva Zambrano	Mike Vogel; Jeremy Northam; Elisabeth Harnois; Lana Parrilla
El ministerio del tiempo	Dr. Nuria Celaya; Dr. Madrigal; Dr. Vargas	María Cotiello; Mario Tardón; José Luis Torrijo
Monk	Dr. Neven Bell; Dr. Charles Kroger	Héctor Elizondo; Stanley Kamel
Muppets	Dr. Teeth; Dr. Bob ("Veterinarians' Hospital"); Dr. Bunsen Honeydew	Jim Henson; Rowlf the Dog (Jim Henson) (Dave Goelz)

== N ==
Program	Fictional doctor	Actor
NCIS	Dr. Donald "Ducky" Mallard; Dr. Jeanne Benoit; Dr. James "Jimmy" Palmer	David McCallum; Scottie Thompson; Brian Dietzen
NCIS: New Orleans	Dr. Loretta Wade	CCH Pounder
Neighbours	Dr. Clive Gibbons; Dr. Beverly Marshall #2; Dr. Karl Kennedy; Dr. Veronica Olenski; Dr. Darcy Tyler; Dr. Peggy Newton; Dr. Demi Vinton; Dr. Doug Harris; Dr. Rhys Lawson; Dr. Martin Chambers	Geoff Paine; Lisa Armytage; Shaunna O'Grady; Alan Fletcher; Caroline Lloyd; Mark Raffety; Carolyn Bock; Angela Twigg; Mahesh Jadu; Ben Barber; John Wood
The New Adventures of Old Christine	Dr. Palmer	Jason Alexander
New Amsterdam (2008)	Dr. Sara Dillane	Alexie Gilmore
New Amsterdam (2018)	Dr. Max Goodwin; Dr. Helen Sharpe; Dr. Lauren Bloom; Dr. Floyd Reynolds; Dr. Iggy Frome; Dr. Vijay Kapoor; Dr. Elizabeth Wilder	Ryan Eggold; Freema Agyeman; Janet Montgomery; Jocko Sims; Tyler Labine; Anupam Kher; Sandra Mae Frank
Nip/tuck	Dr. Merril Bobolit; Dr. Quentin Costa; Dr. Sean McNamara; Dr. Barrett Moore; Dr. Erica Noughton; Dr. Christian Troy; Dr. Logan Taper	Joey Slotnick; Bruno Campos; Dylan Walsh; Alec Baldwin; Vanessa Redgrave; Julian McMahon; Richard Burgi
No Ordinary Family	Dr. Stephanie Powell	Julie Benz
Northern Exposure	Dr. Phillip Capra; Dr. Joel Fleischman	Paul Provenza; Rob Morrow
Numbers	Dr. Charles "Charlie" Eppes; Dr. Mildred "Millie" Finch; Dr. Marshall Penfield	David Krumholtz; Kathy Najimy; Colin Hanks
Nurse Jackie	Dr. Fitch Cooper; Dr. Eleanor O'Hara	Peter Facinelli; Eve Best
Nurses	Dr. Hank Kaplan Dr. Riskin	Kip Gilman Florence Stanley

== O ==
Program	Fictional doctor	Actor
One Life to Live	Dr. Jim Craig; Dr. Ben Davidson; Dr. Joshua "Josh" Hall; Dr. Peter Janssen; Dr. Ivan Kipling; Dr. Dorian Lord; Dr. Michael McBain; Dr. Ben Price; Dr. Marty Saybrooke; Dr. Mark Toland; Dr. Price Trainor; Dr. Spencer Truman; Dr. Will Vernon; Dr. Danny Wolek; Dr. Larry Wolek	Robert Milli; Mark Derwin; Laurence Fishburne; Jeff Pomerantz; Jack Betts; Nancy Pinkerton; R. Brandon Johnson; Charles Malik Whitfield; Susan Haskell; Tommy Lee Jones; Thurman Scott; Kimberlin Brown; Farley Granger; Eddie Moran; Paul Tulley
Only Murders in the Building	Dr. Grover Stanley	Russell G. Jones
The Other Side	Dr. Estrada	Andreu Buenafuente
Out of Practice	Dr. Ben Barnes; Dr. Lydia Barnes; Dr. Oliver Barnes; Dr. Regina Barnes; Dr. Stewart Barnes	Christopher Gorham; Stockard Channing; Ty Burrell; Paula Marshall; Henry Winkler

== P ==
Program	Fictional doctor	Actor
Passions	Dr. Eve Johnson Russell	Tracey Ross
The Pentaverate	Dr. Hobart Clark	Keegan-Michael Key
Polseres vermelles	Dr. Abel; Dr. Alfredo; Dr. Andrade; Dr. Josep; Dr. Marcos; Dr. Montcada	Ignasi Guasch; Fermí Reixach; Marta Angelat; Andreu Rifé; Caterina Alorda; Albert Pérez
Prison Break	Dr. Sara Tancredi	Sarah Wayne Callies
Private Practice	Dr. Samuel "Sam" Bennett; Dr. Naomi Bennett; Dr. Cooper Freedman; Dr. Charlotte King; Dr. Addison Montgomery; Dr. Violet Turner; Dr. Peter "Pete" Wilder	Taye Diggs; Audra McDonald; Paul Adelstein; KaDee Strickland; Kate Walsh; Amy Brenneman; Tim Daly
Providence	Dr. Jim Hansen; Dr. Sydney "Syd" Hansen; Dr. Helen Reynolds; Dr. Jordan Roberts; Dr. J.D. Scanlon	Mike Farrell; Melina Kanakaredes; Leslie Silva; Steven Culp; Richard Burgi
Psych	Woody the Coroner	Kurt Fuller
The Psychiatrist	Dr. Bernard Altman; Dr. James Whitman	Luther Adler; Roy Thinnes
Pulsaciones	Dr. Alejandro "Álex" Puga	Pablo Derqui

== Q ==
Program	Fictional doctor	Actor
Quantum Leap	Dr. Sam Beckett; Dr. Verbeena Beeks	Scott Bakula; Candy Ann Brown
Quincy, M.E.	Dr. Robert Astin; Dr. Sam Fujiyama; Dr. R. Quincy	John S. Ragin; Robert Ito; Jack Klugman

== R ==
Program	Fictional doctor	Actor
Reba	Dr. Brock Hart; Dr. Todd	Christopher Rich; Martin Mull
Red Band Society	Dr. Erin Grace; Dr. Adam McAndrew; Dr. Larry Naday	Mandy Moore; Dave Annable; Adrian Lester
Rex the Runt	Dr. Dogg	Paul Merton
The River	Dr. Emmet Cole	Bruce Greenwood
Rizzoli & Isles	Dr. Maura Isles; Dr. T. Pike; Dr. Ian Faulkner	Sasha Alexander; Ed Begley Jr. Jonathan Cake
The Rookie	Dr. Morgan; Dr. Grace Sawyer	Felicia Day; Ali Larter
Rosewood	Dr. Mike Boyce; Dr. Max Cahn; Dr. Kat Crawford; Dr. Anita Eubanks; Dr. Derek Foster; Dr. Mitchie Mendelsohn; Dr. Beaumont Rosewood, Sr. Dr. Beaumont Rosewood, Jr. Dr. Adrian Webb	Taye Diggs; Mackenzie Astin; Nicole Ari Parker; Sherri Shepherd; Adrian Pasdar; Sam Huntington; Vondie Curtis-Hall; Morris Chestnut; Eric Winter
Royal Pains	Dr. Henry 'Hank' Lawson; Dr. Jeremiah Sacani; Dr. Paul Van Dyke; Dr. Adams; Dr. Dan Irving	Mark Feuerstein; Ben Shenkman; Kyle Howard; John C. Vennema; Jason Kravits

== S ==
Program	Fictional doctor	Actor
St. Elsewhere	Dr. Wendy Armstrong; Dr. Daniel Auschlander; Dr. Elliot Axelrod; Dr. Hugh Beale; Dr. Robert Caldwell; Dr. Annie Cavanero; Dr. Phillip Chandler; Dr. Mark Craig; Dr. Victor Ehrlich; Dr. Wayne Fiscus; Dr. John Gideon; Dr. Seth Griffin; Dr. Emily Humes; Dr. Paulette Kiem; Dr. V. J. Kochar; Dr. Cathy Martin; Dr. Jack Morrison; Dr. Carol Novino; Dr. Alan Poe; Dr. Michael Ridley; Dr. Ben Samuels; Dr. Roxanne Turner; Dr. Jaqueline Wade; Dr. Donald Westphall; Dr. Peter White	Kim Miyori; Norman Lloyd; Stephen Furst; G.W. Bailey; Mark Harmon; Cynthia Sikes; Denzel Washington; William Daniels; Ed Begley, Jr. Howie Mandel; Ronny Cox; Bruce Greenwood; Judith Hansen; France Nuyen; Kavi Raz; Barbara Whinnery; David Morse; Cindy Pickett; Brian Tochi; Paul Sand; David Birney; Alfre Woodard; Sagan Lewis; Ed Flanders; Terence Knox
Sanctuary	Dr. Helen Magnus; Dr. Will Zimmerman	Amanda Tapping; Robin Dunne
Santa Barbara	Dr. Scott Clark	Vincent Irizarry
Saturday Night Live	Dr. Beaman; Dr. Charles Claproth; Dr. Emory Coleman; Dr. Doug; Dr. Dowden; Dr. Flemming; Dr. Green; Dr. Griffin; Captain Doctor Rice Lake; Dr. Mark; Dr. Trent Markham; Dr. McAndrews; Dr. Leonard McCoy #1; Dr. Leonard McCoy #2; Dr. Perkins; Dr. Poop; Dr. Marshall Reames; Dr. Ted	Will Ferrell; Jon Lovitz; David Alan Grier; Kevin Nealon; Kevin Spacey; Matt Damon; Jon Lovitz; Ellen Cleghorne; Dan Aykroyd; Alec Baldwin; Phil Hartman; Julia Sweeney; Dan Aykroyd; Phil Hartman; Tim Meadows; Steve Martin; Val Kilmer; Chris Elliott
Saved	Dr. Alice Alden; Dr. Martin Cole; Dr. Fish; Dr. Daniel Lanier; Dr. Karen Thorpe	Elizabeth Reaser; David Clennon; Karin Konoval; Andrew Airlie; Heather Stephens
Saving Hope	Dr. George Baumann; Dr. Dawn Bell; Dr. James Dey; Dr. Joel Goran; Dr. Shahir Hamza; Dr. Charlie Harris; Dr. Sydney Katz; Dr. Dana Kinney; Dr. Maggie Lin; Dr. Zach Miller; Dr. Gavin Murphy; Dr. Selena Quintos; Dr. Alex Reid; Dr. Tom Reycraft; Dr. Melanda Tolliver	Steve Cumyn; Michelle Nolden; Mac Fyfe; Daniel Gillies; Huse Madhavji; Michael Shanks; Stacey Farber; Wendy Crewson; Julia Taylor Ross; Benjamin Ayres; Kristopher Turner; Lexa Doig; Erica Durance; K. C. Collins; Glenda Braganza
Schmigadoon!	Dr. Melissa Gimble "Old Doc" Lopez; Dr. Jorge "Doc" Lopez; Dr. Josh Skinner	Cecily Strong; Pedro Salvin; Jaime Camil; Keegan-Michael Key
Scrubs	Dr. Seymour Beardfacé; Dr. Kim Briggs; Dr. Molly Clock; Dr. Perry Cox; Dr. John "J.D." Dorian; Dr. Keith Dudemeister; Dr. Bob Kelso; Dr. Walter Mickhead; Dr. Grace Miller; Dr. Doug Murphy; Dr. Todd Quinlan; Dr. Elliot Reid; Dr. Coleman "Colonel Doctor" Slawski; Dr. Christopher Turk; Dr. Wen	Geoff Stevenson; Elizabeth Banks; Heather Graham; John C. McGinley; Zach Braff; Travis Schuldt; Ken Jenkins; Frank Encarnacao; Bellamy Young; Johnny Kastl; Robert Maschio; Sarah Chalke; Bob Bencomo; Donald Faison; Charles Chun
Secret Diary of a Call Girl	Dr. Alex McLoud	Callum Blue
Seinfeld	Dr. Tim Whatley; Dr. Sara Sitarides; Dr. Ben; Dr. Ben Galpen; Dr. Rick	Bryan Cranston; Marcia Cross; Richard Burgi; Bob Odenkirk; Randy Carter
Shortland Street	Dr. Jonathon McKenna; Dr. Oscar Henry; Dr. Brooke Freeman; Dr. Chris Warner; Dr. Adam Heywood	Kieren Hutchison; Christopher Brown; Beth Allen; Chris Warner; Leighton Cardno
The Simpsons	Dr. Julius Hibbert #2; Dr. Marvin Monroe; Dr. Nick Riviera #2; Dr. Wolfe	Harry Shearer (voice); Kevin Michael Richardson (voice); Harry Shearer (voice); Hank Azaria (voice); Eric Lopez (voice); Hank Azaria (voice)
Simsala Grimm	Doc Croc	Jörg Stuttmann (voice)
The Six Million Dollar Man	Dr. Rudy Wells #1 #2 #3	Martin Balsam; Alan Oppenheimer; Martin E. Brooks
Smallville	Dr. Helen Bryce; Dr. Claire Foster; Dr. Lawrence Garner; Dr. Emil Hamilton; Dr. Steven Hamilton; Dr. Harden; Dr. Langston; Dr. MacIntyre; Dr. Virgil Swann; Dr. Lia Teng; Dr. Yaeger Scanlan; Dr. Fredrick Walden	Emmanuelle Vaugier; Lorena Gale; Martin Cummins; Alessandro Juliani; Joe Morton; Rekha Sharma; Fred Henderson; Julian Christopher; Christopher Reeve; Françoise Yip; Jerry Wasserman; Rob LaBelle
The Sopranos	Dr. Bruce Cusamano; Dr. Jennifer Melfi	Robert LuPone; Lorraine Bracco
Space: 1999	Dr. Victor Bergman; Dr. Helena Russell	Barry Morse; Barbara Bain
Star Trek	Dr. Julian Bashir; Dr. Phillip Boyce; Dr. Beverly Crusher; EMH Program AK-1 (The Doctor); Dr. Leonard McCoy; Dr. Phlox; Dr. Mark Piper; Dr. Katherine Pulaski; Dr. Selar	Alexander Siddig; John Hoyt; Gates McFadden; Robert Picardo; DeForest Kelley; John Billingsley; Paul Fix; Diana Muldaur; Suzie Plakson
Stargate Atlantis	Dr. Carson Beckett; Dr. Kate Heightmeyer; Dr. Jennifer Keller; Dr. Rodney McKay; Dr. Elizabeth Weir; Dr. Radek Zelenka	Paul McGillion; Claire Rankin; Jewel Staite; David Hewlett; Torri Higginson; David Nykl
Stargate SG-1	Dr. Samantha Carter; Dr. Janet Fraiser; Dr. Daniel Jackson; Dr. Carolyn Lam; Dr. Catherine Langford; Dr. Bill Lee; Dr. Robert Rothman	Amanda Tapping; Teryl Rothery; Michael Shanks; Lexa Doig; Viveca Lindfors; Bill Dow; Jason Schombing
SGU Stargate Universe	Dr. Nicholas Rush	Robert Carlyle
Strange World	Dr. Paul Turner	Tim Guinee
Strangers and Brothers	Doctor	Richard Warner
Strong Medicine	Dr. Nick Biancavilla; Dr. Andy Campbell; Dr. Luisa "Lu" Magdalena Delgado; Dr. Robert "Bob" Jackson; Dr. Dana Stowe; Dr. Kayla Thornton; Dr. Dylan West	Brennan Elliott; Patricia Richardson; Rosa Blasi; Philip Casnoff; Janine Turner; Tamera Mowry; Rick Schroder
Suburgatory	Dr. Noah Werner	Alan Tudyk
The Surgeon	Dr. Eve Agius; Dr. Sam Dash; Dr. Lachie Hatsatouris; Dr. Ravi Jayawardener; Dr. Abe Morris; Dr. Julian Sierson; Dr. Nick Steele	Justine Clarke; Sam Worthington; Matthew Zeremes; Chum Ehelepola; Christopher Morris; Nicholas Bell; Matthew Newton

== T ==
Program	Fictional doctor	Actor
Ted Lasso	Dr. Jacob Bryanson; Dr. Sharon M. Fieldstone	Mike O'Gorman; Sarah Niles
Temperatures Rising	Dr. Lloyd Axton; Dr. Vincent Campanelli; Dr. Charles Claver; Dr. Paul Mercy; Dr. Jerry Noland	Jeff Morrow; James Whitmore; John Dehner; Paul Lynde; Cleavon Little
Terra Nova	Dr. Elisabeth Shannon; Dr. Malcolm Wallace	Shelley Conn; Rod Hallett
Three Rivers	Dr. Andy Yablonski	Alex O'Loughlin
The Time Tunnel	Dr. Ann MacGregor; Dr. Tony Newman; Dr. Doug Phillips; Dr. Raymond Swain	Lee Meriwether; James Darren; Robert Colbert; John Zaremba
Torchwood	Dr. Owen Harper; Dr. Martha Jones; Dr. Vera Juarez; Dr. Rupesh Patanjali; Dr. Tanizaki	Burn Gorman; Freema Agyeman; Arlene Tur; Rik Makarem; Togo Igawa
Touched by an Angel	Dr. Kate Calder; Dr. Kate Marlens; Dr. Rebecca Markham; Dr. Rence Patterson	Stephanie Zimbalist; Victoria Mallory; Faye Dunaway; Steven Culp
Transplant	Dr. Bashir "Bash" Hamed; Dr. Magalie "Mags" Leblanc; Dr. Jedediah "Jed" Bishop; Dr. June Curtis; Dr. Theo Hunter; Dr. Aajay Singh; Dr. Wendy Atwater; Dr. Mark Novak; Dr. Neeta Devi; Dr. Karim Esfahani; Dr. Elizabeth Bergeron	Hamza Haq; Laurence Leboeuf; John Hannah; Ayisha Issa; Jim Watson; Sugith Varughese; Linda E. Smith; Gord Rand; Rekha Sharma; Ali Momen; Marianne Farley
Trapper John, M.D.	Dr. Jacob Christmas; Dr. George Alonzo 'Gonzo' Gates; Dr. Jacob 'Jackpot' Jackson; Dr. John Francis Xavier 'Trapper' McIntyre; Dr. John 'J.T.' McIntyre; Dr. Stanley Riverside II; Dr. Charlie Nichols; Dr. David Sandler	Kip Gilman; Gregory Harrison; Brian Stokes Mitchell; Pernell Roberts; Timothy Busfield; Charles Siebert; Michael Tucci; Richard Schaal
Trauma	Dr. Joseph Saviano; Dr. Diana Van Dine	Jamey Sheridan; Scottie Thompson
Twin Peaks	Dr. William Hayward; Dr. Lawrence Jacoby	Warren Frost; Russ Tamblyn
Two and a Half Men	Dr. Linda Freeman; Dr. Alan Harper; Dr. Herb Melnick; Dr. Prajneep	Jane Lynch; Jon Cryer; Ryan Stiles; Kris Iyer
Two Faces West	Dr. Rick January	Charles Bateman

== W ==
Program	Fictional doctor	Actor
Waking the Dead	Dr. Grace Foley; Dr. Frankie Wharton; Dr. Felix Gibson; Dr. Eve Lockhart	Sue Johnston; Holly Aird; Esther Hall; Tara Fitzgerald
War of the Worlds	Dr. Harrison Blackwood; Dr. Suzanne McCullough	Jared Martin; Lynda Mason Green
The West Wing	Dr. Abigail Bartlet; Dr. Stanley Keyworth	Stockard Channing; Adam Arkin
Will & Grace	Dr. Leo Markus	Harry Connick, Jr.
WKRP in Cincinnati	Dr. Johnny Fever	Howard Hesseman
Various programs	Dr. Watson	Jeremy Brett, Martin Freeman, Lucy Liu, etc.

== X ==
Program	Fictional doctor	Actor
The X-Files	Dr. Dana Scully	Gillian Anderson

== Y ==
Program	Fictional doctor	Actor
Young Dr. Malone	Dr. David Malone; Dr. Jerry Malone	John Connell; William Prince
Young Sheldon	Dr. Carol Lee; Dr. Grant Linkletter; Dr. John Sturgis	Ming-Na Wen; Ed Begley Jr. Wallace Shawn

== Z ==
Program	Fictional doctor	Actor
Zoey's Extraordinary Playlist	Dr. Hamara; Dr. Tesoro	Hiro Kanagawa; Oscar Nunez
