= List of General Hospital: Night Shift characters =

General Hospital: Night Shift is a prime time spin-off of the American ABC Daytime soap opera General Hospital. The series first aired on SOAPnet for a 13-episode run from July 12, 2007, to October 4, 2007, and began a second season of 14 episodes on July 22, 2008. As of March 2008, the first season of the series was "SOAPnet's most-watched series ever," with ABC Daytime and SOAPnet President Brian Frons noting that Night Shift drew more than 1 million new viewers to the channel during its first season.

Chronicling the nighttime adventures of familiar and new characters at Port Charles General Hospital, the series consists of self-contained episodes which "delve deeper into the relationships, friendships and medical cases seen at the hospital." Alongside new characters are those "plucked from General Hospital's history" and "younger characters with ties to GH's core families." The first season of the series features General Hospital regulars Dr. Robin Scorpio (Kimberly McCullough), Dr. Patrick Drake (Jason Thompson), Jason Morgan (Steve Burton), and Epiphany Johnson (Sonya Eddy), as well as guest star Billy Dee Williams as Toussaint Dubois. The second season features these same characters minus Burton's Jason, as well as the return of legacy General Hospital characters Robert Scorpio (Tristan Rogers) and Jagger Cates (Antonio Sabàto, Jr.).

== Andy Archer ==
Dr. Andy Archer
- General Hospital: Night Shift; General Hospital character
- Portrayed by: Ron Melendez
- First appearance: "Paternity Ward"; July 26, 2007
- Last appearance: January 29, 2009 (on General Hospital)
In-universe information
- Occupation: Anesthesiologist

Andy Archer is an anesthesiologist at General Hospital, portrayed by Ron Melendez in the 2007 first season of General Hospital: Night Shift. In the storyline, Archer self-medicates with gas to help himself sleep but soon becomes addicted; he is nearly killed when "psychotic" nurse Jolene Crowell tries to kill him by upping his dosage as he sleeps. He also becomes involved with fellow doctor Kelly Lee, who is herself battling a sex addiction and rebuffs his desire to pursue a relationship. They soon agree to be friends and help each other with their addictions.

Archer subsequently appears on General Hospital sporadically until January 29, 2009, when he dies as the first victim of a biotoxin accidentally released in the hospital.

== Saira Batra ==
Dr. Saira Batra
- General Hospital: Night Shift character
- Portrayed by: Azita Ghanizada
- First appearance: "Crash"; July 22, 2008
- Created by: Sri Rao
In-universe information
- Occupation: Doctor; Holistic health specialist

Dr. Saira Batra is a new doctor specializing in Holistic health at Port Charles General Hospital. Introduced in the July 22, 2008 second-season premiere episode "Crash," Saira is a friend of Dr. Robin Scorpio's from medical school, and had been invited to Port Charles by Robin herself.

== Stone Cates ==
Stone Cates
- General Hospital: Night Shift character
- Portrayed by: Cameron Boyce
- Duration: 2008
- First appearance: July 21, 2008
- Last appearance: October 22, 2008
- Created by: Sri Rao
- Introduced by: Lisa de Cazotte
In-universe information
- Parents: Jagger Cates
- Grandparents: Lewis Cates; Sophia Estelle Cates
- Aunts and uncles: Michael "Stone" Cates; Gina Cates

Stone Cates is the son of John "Jagger" Cates, named after his deceased uncle Michael "Stone" Cates. Jagger and Stone visit Robin Scorpio, who notices that Stone acts differently than most children his age. Stone is later diagnosed with autism.

== Jolene Crowell ==
Jolene Crowell
- General Hospital: Night Shift character
- Portrayed by: Amanda Baker (2007)
- First appearance: 2007 (GH:NS)
In-universe information
- Occupation: Student nurse
- Siblings: Nadine Crowell; Unnamed brother
- Aunts and uncles: Raylene Crowell (deceased); Vince Crowell
- First cousins: Bo Crowell

Jolene Crowell is a student nurse introduced in season one, and is ultimately revealed to be secretly working for the HMO Medcam, which seeks to acquire Port Charles General Hospital. Jolene is responsible for the string of accidents and deaths which plague the hospital, including an explosion in an ambulance, a sabotaged elevator with a pregnant woman inside, and the attempted murders of a doctor and a janitor.

Jolene sleeps with virgin Damian Spinelli, who is in love with her; weeks later, she jumps in front of a bullet during a gang fight at the hospital to save him. Seriously injured, Jolene lapses into a coma.

== Toussaint Dubois ==
Toussaint Dubois
- General Hospital: Night Shift; General Hospital character
- Billy Dee Williams as Toussaint Dubois
- Portrayed by: Billy Dee Williams
- First appearance: "Frayed Anatomies"; July 12, 2007
In-universe information
- Occupation: Orderly

Toussaint Dubois is introduced in the July 12, 2007, episode "Frayed Anatomies" as a janitor at Port Charles General Hospital. It is ultimately revealed that he had previously been a member of a famous band, The Saints.

Williams returned for the second season in 2008. In his storyline, Epiphany Johnson, R.N. hires Toussaint as an orderly, and they begin a romantic relationship.

On June 4, 2009, Toussaint reappears on General Hospital.

== Kyle Julian ==
Dr. Kyle Julian
- General Hospital: Night Shift character
- Portrayed by: Adam Grimes
- First appearance: "Crash"; July 22, 2008
In-universe information
- Occupation: Medical intern
- Parents: Patricia Julian
- Siblings: Leo Julian (adopted)

Dr. Kyle Julian is an intern at Port Charles General Hospital introduced in the July 22, 2008 second-season premiere episode "Crash." He was portrayed by actor Adam Grimes.

In that episode it is revealed that Kyle is the younger brother of Dr. Leo Julian, and that the two do not get along. Kyle also tells fellow intern Dr. Claire Simpson that he is gay. The July 29, 2008 episode "Other People's Children" establishes that Leo had been adopted around the age of 4 or 5. In "Brothers & Sisters" (9/23/08), their mother Patricia notes that she and her husband adopted Leo because they believed she was unable to have children, and she had subsequently become pregnant with Kyle. Kyle becomes romantically involved with a liver transplant patient named Eric Whitlow, played by Chad Allen.

Kyle and Claire are the main characters of the online series of webisodes Night Shift: Claire & Kyle.

== Leo Julian ==
Dr. Leo Julian
- General Hospital; General Hospital: Night Shift character
- Portrayed by: Dominic Rains (2007); Ethan Rains (2008)
- First appearance: July 2, 2007 (GH) "Frayed Anatomies"; July 12, 2007 (GH:NS)
- Created by: Robert Guza, Jr.
In-universe information
- Occupation: Cardiologist
- Parents: Patricia Julian (via adoption)
- Siblings: Kyle Julian (adopted)

Dr. Leo Julian is a surgeon at Port Charles General Hospital.

First introduced on General Hospital on July 2, 2007, Leo was portrayed by Iranian actor Dominic Rains for the series' first season from July 12, 2007 to October 4, 2007. When Rains was unavailable for the series' second season in July 2008, his brother Ethan Rains was cast in the role starting July 22, 2008.

In the July 22, 2008 episode "Crash," it is revealed that new hospital intern Dr. Kyle Julian is Leo's younger brother, and that the two do not get along. The July 29, 2008 episode "Other People's Children" establishes that Leo had been adopted around the age of 4 or 5. In "Brothers & Sisters" (9/23/08), their mother Patricia notes that though she had been unable to have children and so she and her husband had adopted Leo, she had subsequently become pregnant with Kyle.

== Claire Simpson ==
Dr. Claire Simpson
- General Hospital: Night Shift character
- Portrayed by: Carrie Southworth
- First appearance: "Crash"; July 22, 2008
In-universe information
- Occupation: Medical intern

Dr. Claire Simpson is an intern at Port Charles General Hospital introduced in the July 22, 2008 second-season premiere episode "Crash." She was portrayed by actress Carrie Southworth.

Claire soon befriends fellow intern Dr. Kyle Julian. Claire and Kyle are the main characters of the online series of webisodes Night Shift: Claire & Kyle.

== Stacey Sloan ==
Stacey Sloan
- General Hospital: Night Shift character
- Alla Korot as Stacey Sloan
- Portrayed by: Alla Korot
- First appearance: "Frayed Anatomies"; July 12, 2007
- Last appearance: "Mother's Day"; August 23, 2007
In-universe information
- Spouse: Curtis Sloan
- Children: Rebecca Sloan (with Curtis, via in-vetro; born 8/23/07 via c-section)

Stacey Sloan is an expectant mother with HIV who bonds with Robin Scorpio. She dies shortly after giving birth to her daughter Rebecca.

== Regina Thompson ==
Regina Thompson
- General Hospital: Night Shift character
- Portrayed by: Angel Wainwright
- First appearance: "Frayed Anatomies"; July 12, 2007
In-universe information
- Occupation: Student Nurse
- Children: Unnamed child (sex unknown, aborted)

Regina Thompson is a student nurse at General Hospital during the first season of General Hospital: Night Shift.
