= Alla Korot =

American actress

- Алла Корот
- Occupations: Actress, dancer
- Years active: 1990–present
- Known for: Allie Doyle Martin (All My Children); Stacey Sloan (General Hospital: Night Shift)
- Spouse: Yuval Selik (m. 2010)

Alla Korot (Note: Ukrainian: Алла Корот, romanized: Alla Korot) is a Ukrainian-American actress and dancer best known for her soap opera roles of Allie Doyle Martin on All My Children and Stacey Sloan on General Hospital: Night Shift.

== Early life ==
One of Korst's first acting appearances was opposite actor-musician, Scott Grimes in his music video, "I Don't Even Mind" in 1989.

== Career ==
=== Film ===
Korot portrayed Angelique in Night of the Cyclone (1990), Sophia Petrenko in Domestic Import (2006), and a Russian translator in Fracture (2007).

=== Television ===
In 1991, Korot moved to New York City and won the role of Jenna Norris on the soap opera Another World. She departed the series in December 1992. Korot guest starred in Parker Lewis Can't Lose, Diagnosis: Murder, ER, Charmed, 24, NCIS, and Castle. She had recurring roles on The District as Erin Vratalov, on the SOAPnet series General Hospital: Night Shift as Stacey Sloan and on Grimm as Dasha Karpushin.

Korot portrayed Allie Doyle Martin on All My Children (1997–1998). In December 2015, she announced she had joined the NBC soap, Days of Our Lives, in the role of Janet Bernard, and would begin filming in January 2016. That role lasted two episodes, June 29–30, 2016. On August 15, 2017, she landed Nurse Darya on General Hospital and appeared on September 20, 2017.

Korot was in the made-for-TV Movies The Colony as Jessica James, Gone But Not Forgotten as Lisa Darius, based on the novel of the same name by Phillip M. Margolin, and Jane Doe: Yes, I Remember It Well as Ursula Voss.

=== Cinematography ===
In 1996, Korot was a cinematographer–(Video Reference Cast) for The Hunchback of Notre Dame. based on the 1831 novel of the same name by Victor Hugo.

== Personal life ==
Korot is Jewish. She is married to a Russian-born Israeli, Yuval Selik, and the two co-launched L'uvalla, an Internet-based skin care business.

== Filmography ==
=== Acting ===
==== Film ====
Year	Title	Role	Notes
1990	Night of the Cyclone	Angelique	
2001	Shoo Fly	Lead actress	
2001	Free	Intimidating Girl #1	
2004	The Arsonist	Janine	
2006	Domestic Import	Sophia Petrenko	
2007	Fracture	Russian translator	
2009	The Intruders	Annie Foster	
2015	I Spit on Your Grave III: Vengeance Is Mine	Cassie’s mom	

==== Television ====
Year	Title	Role	Notes	Ref.
1990	Parker Lewis Can't Lose	Mary Lou Connor	Episodes: "Close But No Guitar" (S 1:Ep 5); "G.A.G. Dance" (S 1:Ep 6)	
1990–93	Another World	Jenna Norris		
1992	19th Daytime Emmy Awards	Presenter		
1992	Soap Opera Digest Awards	Presenter		
1994	Diagnosis: Murder	Jennifer Crespi	Episode: "The Plague" (S 1:Ep 18)	
1994	Silk Stalkings	Claire Ballantine	Episode: "Where There's a Will..." (S 4:Ep 6)	
1995	Red Shoe Diaries	Anne Adams	Episode: "Details" (S 4:Ep 11)	
1995	Pig Sty	Sexy Woman	Episode: "Party!!!" (S 1:Ep 7)	
1996	The Colony	Jessica James	Made-for-TV Movie written and directed by Rob Hedden	
1997	Diagnosis: Murder	Stephanie Hitcher	Episode: "A Passion for Murder" (S 4:Ep 20)	
1997–98	All My Children	Allie Doyle Martin	Recurring	
2000	Two Guys and a Girl	Julie Sutton	Episode: "The Wedding Dress" (S 3:Ep 15)	
2001	Family Law	Kim Forlano	Episode: "Irreparable Harm" (S 3:Ep 1)	
2001	Men, Women & Dogs	Yoga Teacher	Episode: "Let Sleeping Dogs Lie" (S 1:Ep 5)	
2001	ER	Mrs. Dupont	Episode: "Never Say Never" (S 8:Ep 4)	
2001	Men, Women & Dogs	Cindi	Episode: "The Magic Three-Legged Sex Dog" (S 1:Ep 12)	
2002	The District	Erin Vratalov	Recurring	
2003	Charmed	Margaret Henderson	Episode: "Soul Survivor" (S 6:Ep 7)	
2004	Nip/Tuck	Claire Grubman	Episode:"Mrs. Grubman" (S 2:Ep 4)	
2005	Alias	Marina Avden / Diane	Episode: "Welcome to Liberty Village" (S 4:Ep 5)	
2005	Gone But Not Forgotten	Lisa Darius	Made-for-TV Movie directed by Armand Mastroianni and teleplay by Steven H. Berman; Based on the novel of the same name by Phillip M. Margolin	
2005	CSI: NY	Connie Williams	Episode: "Summer in the City" (S 2:Ep 1)	
2006	Jane Doe: Yes, I Remember It Well	Ursula Voss	Made-for-TV Movie directed by Armand Mastroianni	
2006	24	Suzanne Cummings	Episode: "Day 5: 2:00 p.m. – 3:00 p.m." (S 5:Ep 8)	
2006	Shark	Tracy Weston	Episode: "Sins of the Mother" (S 1:Ep 10)	
2007	General Hospital: Night Shift	Stacey Sloan	Recurring	
2009	Cold Case	Alice Mills	Episode: "The Brush Man" (S 6:Ep 14)	
2009	The Mentalist	Jemma Prentiss	Episode: "Blood Brothers" (S 1:Ep 22)	
2009	NCIS	Linda DeMarco	Episode: "Endgame" (S 7:Ep 7)	
2011	Law & Order: LA	Anna Ackroyd	Episode: "Plummer Park" (S 1:Ep 18)	
2011	My Favorite Shaman	Lead actress	Made-for-TV Movie written and directed by Susan Ashley Basinski	
2012	Bones	Sophia Berman	Episode: "The Crack in the Code" (S 7:Ep 6)	
2015	Castle	Dry Cleaner	Episodes: "XY" (S 8:Ep 1); "XX" (S 8:Ep 2)	
2016	Days of Our Lives	Janet Bernard	Episodes: "Episode #11,2875"; "Episode #11,2876"	
2017	Grimm	Dasha Karpushin	Recurring	
2017	General Hospital	Nurse Darya	Episode: "Episode #13,891"	
2019	9-1-1	Vicky	Episode: "Sink or Swim" (S 3:Ep 2)	

=== Cinematography ===
Year	Title	Role	Notes	Ref.
1996	The Hunchback of Notre Dame	Cinematographer–(Video Reference Cast)	Animated musical–drama film directed by Gary Trousdale and Kirk Wise; Based on The Hunchback of Notre-Dame by Victor Hugo	
