= Ethan Rains =

Iranian-born American actor (born 1981)

- Born: Iman Nazemzadeh; 19 February 1981 (age 44); Tehran, Iran
- Occupation: Actor
- Years active: 1993–present
- Relatives: Dominic Rains (brother)

Ethan Rains (born Iman Nazemzadeh; February 19, 1981, in Tehran, Iran) is an Iranian American actor, best known for his portrayal of Dr. Leo Julian on the second season of SOAPnet's General Hospital: Night Shift, a 13-episode prime time spin-off of the ABC daytime soap opera General Hospital. Rains' brother Dominic Rains had initially played the role, but he replaced him after he became unavailable for the second season. In December 2011, he guest starred on Days of Our Lives as a villain in a storyline involving illegal internet gambling.

In 2009, Rains was featured in the horror film Open Graves as the character Tomás.

In 2019, Rains starred in the film Samir with Sprague Grayden, Michelle Lukes, and Peter Greene.

== Personal life ==
Rains attended The Colony High School and graduated in 1999. He also attended Southern Methodist University and majored in Theatre.

== Filmography ==
=== Television ===
Year	Work	Role	Notes
2003	Dragon Ball GT	Son Para	
2004	YuYu Hakusho	Asato Kido	Voice
2004–2005	LAX	Joe	5 episodes
2005	The Young and the Restless	Zach	3 episodes
2005	Judging Amy	Jusef Said	Episode: "The New Normal"
2005	The Closer	Faraz Mokhtari	Episode: "LA Woman"
2006	E-Ring	Adil Al-Masadi	Episode: "Brothers in Arms"
2006	The Unit	Iranian Embassy Guard	
2006	Courting Alex	Buddy	2 episodes
2008	General Hospital: Night Shift	Dr. Leo Julian	14 episodes
2010	CSI: Miami	Brian Nassir	Episode: "Dishonor"
2010	24	Ali	5 episodes
2011	Days of Our Lives	Horace	2 episodes
2011	Teen Wolf	Stockton	
2013–2014	NCIS	Kevin Hussein "IT Kevin"	2 episodes
2014	NCIS: Los Angeles	Mack	Episode: "Tuhon"
2018	Into the Dark	Doug	Episode: "Good Boy"
2019	Defrost: The Virtual Series	Eduardo Perez	TV short
2021	NCIS: Hawai'i	Dr. Dunne	2 episodes
2022	The Old Man	Wahid	2 episodes
2024	The Chosen	Zechariah	Season 4, Episode 8

=== Film ===
Year	Work	Role	Notes
2003	Saving Jessica Lynch	Iman Nazemzadeh (Iraqi Deserter)	Television film
2004	Dragon Ball Z: Bojack Unbound	Kogu	
2004	Dragon Ball GT: A Hero's Legacy	Bully	Television film
2005	Sin City	Bozo #4	
2009	Open Graves	Tomás	
2014	Captain America: The Winter Soldier	Lead EMT	
2018	The 15:17 to Paris	Ben Zomerdyk	
2019	Samir	Samir	

=== Video games ===
Year	Work	Role	Notes
2012	Call of Duty: Black Ops II	Additional Voices	
