= Finola Hughes =

British actress

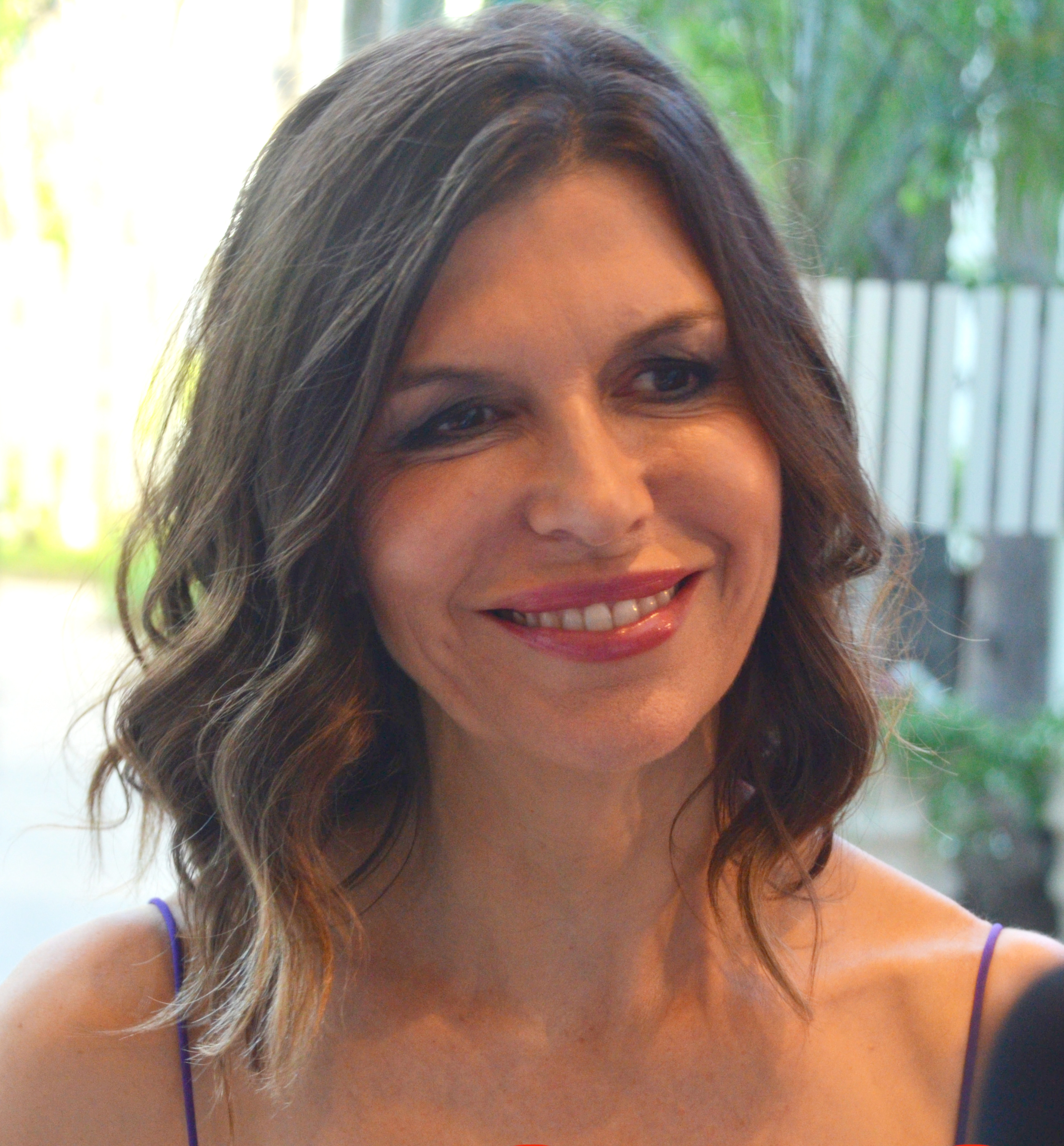
- Hughes in 2013
- Born: 29 October 1959 (age 66); Kensington, Middlesex, England
- Occupation: Actress
- Years active: 1980–present
- Known for: General Hospital; Staying Alive; All My Children; Charmed; Blossom
- Spouse: Russell Young (m. 1992; div. 2021)
- Children: 3

Finola Hughes (born 29 October 1959) is a British actress, best known for her role as Anna Devane on the ABC soap operas General Hospital and All My Children, and her portrayal of Laura in the 1983 film Staying Alive.

She is also known for her portrayal of Anna Devane's identical twin, Alexandra "Alex" Devane on All My Children and Patty Halliwell on the supernatural series, Charmed. She also portrayed Carol on the final season of the NBC sitcom Blossom. Hughes has also appeared in the films, Aspen Extreme, Above Suspicion and Like Crazy.

== Early life ==
Hughes was born 29 October 1959. She was educated in London. Hughes trained in dance and performing arts at the Arts Educational Schools London.

== Career ==
In 1981, Hughes originated the role of Victoria the White Cat in the London production of Andrew Lloyd Webber's musical Cats. In 1983, she starred with John Travolta in the musical film Staying Alive, a sequel to Saturday Night Fever. She played the role of Laura, an English dancer who is the romantic interest of Travolta's character Tony Manero.

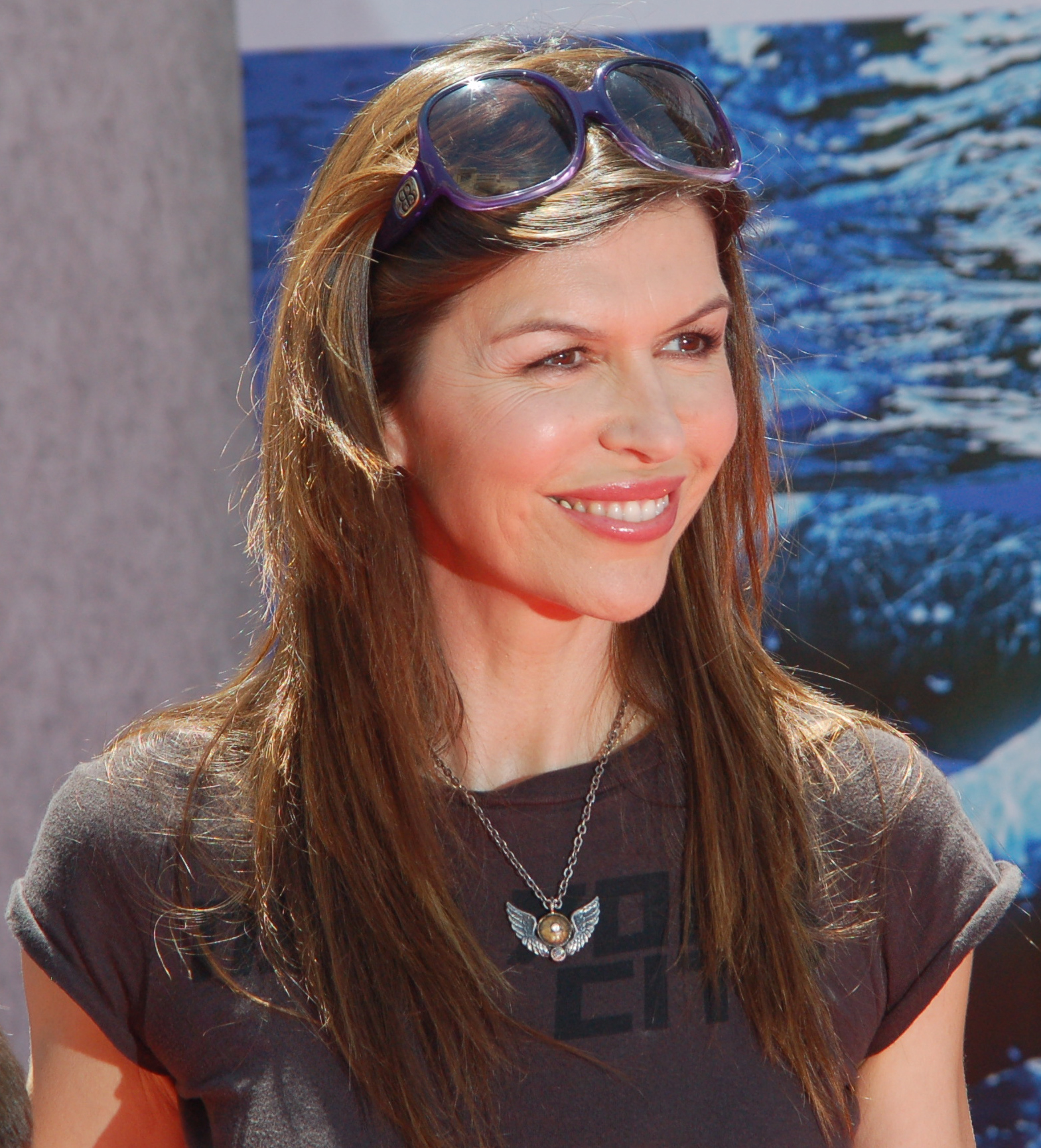
Hughes at the premiere for Earth in April 2009

From 1985 to 1992, Hughes played Anna Devane on General Hospital. She won a Daytime Emmy in 1991, for Outstanding Lead Actress on General Hospital. Hughes was nominated for the same category in 1990 for Anna, in 2000 for All My Children as Alex, and, in 2002, as Anna. After establishing herself as a daytime television star, she was cast in a feature film cameo as a soap opera actress who loses an award to Sally Field in the satirical film Soapdish (1991). Two years later, she played a leading role in the film Aspen Extreme (1993).

Hughes also appeared on the sitcom Blossom in 1993 to 1995 and as the X-Men character Emma Frost in the television movie Generation X (1996). In 1997, she starred in Aaron Spelling's short-lived primetime soap opera Pacific Palisades. She was a frequent guest star on the television series Charmed, playing the mother of the Halliwell girls, Patricia "Patty" Halliwell.

She provided the voice of Lara, Superman's biological mother, in Superman: The Animated Series. Another voice-over role she had was Miss Robertson on an episode of Fox's animated comedy series Life with Louie.

Hughes briefly returned from November 13 to 22, 1995 as Anna's spirit to comfort the character's daughter Robin Scorpio (Kimberly McCullough), who is dealing with the loss of her boyfriend to AIDS-related illness and is herself HIV-positive.

Hughes was cast as Alexandra Devane in 1999 on All My Children. At first, it was unknown what character she would portray. Alexandra debuted on July 23, 1999. Hughes left in the fall of 2000 for maternity leave and returned in February 2001. Alex left on July 9, 2001, to Budapest, Hungary.

In 2001, Hughes started playing Anna on All My Children. In 2003, Hughes left All My Children.

It was announced in April 2006 that Hughes would be returning to GH. In May 2006, as part of the May Sweeps period, three GH veterans would return. Finola Hughes would be reunited with Tristan Rogers (Robert Scorpio) and Emma Samms (Holly Sutton). Following a rise in ratings from her sweeps return, Hughes returned to General Hospital for a limited run through August 2006. She returned the following year on 13 July 2007 and once again on 15 April 2008.

In September 2008, Hughes guest-starred in the General Hospital spinoff series General Hospital: Night Shift. In 2010, she also appeared in the CSI: NY, Make It or Break It and Melissa & Joey.

Finola made a permanent return to General Hospital in 2012. On April 6, 2012, executive producer, Frank Valentini announced on Twitter that Hughes had been placed on contract with the series.

In 2013, Hughes made her feature-film directing debut with indie comedy-drama The Bet. She later starred with Kathryn McCormick in the dance movie Platinum the Dance Movie. In 2015, Hughes directed her second film, Byrd and the Bees a romantic comedy starring Jonathan Rhys Meyers and Tracy Spiridakos.

Hughes reprised her role as Alexandra on General Hospital, beginning April 5, 2017, masquerading as Anna; the duplicity wasn't revealed until May 12, 2017. Hughes ended her reprisal role of Alexandra on June 8, 2017. Hughes reprised the role from March 18 to 21, 2019.

In 2020, Hughes once again reprised the role of Alex while portraying Anna from October 30 to November 9.

== Personal life ==
Hughes married artist Russell Young in 1992 and divorced in 2021. Together they have two sons, Dylan and Cash, and one daughter Sadie.

== Filmography ==
=== Film ===
Year	Title	Role	Notes
1980	The Apple	Dancer	
1981	Clash of the Titans	Dancer	
1982	Nutcracker	Nadia Gargarin	
1983	Staying Alive	Laura	
1984	The Master of Ballantrae	Alison Graeme	
1987	Haunted by Her Past	Megan McGuire	
1990	The Bride in Black	Cybil Cobb	
1991	Soapdish	All My Trials Actress	
1993	Aspen Extreme	Bryce Kellogg	
1994	Dark Side of Genius	Jennifer Cole	
1995	Above Suspicion	Iris	
1996	Generation X	Emma Frost / White Queen	
1996	The Crying Child	Jo Parker	
1997	Prison of Secrets	Angie	
1997	The Corporate Ladder	Dr. Woodward	Voice
1998	Jekyll Island	Ronnie Fredericks	
1998	Pocahontas II: Journey to a New World	Queen Anne	Voice
1998	12 Bucks	Classy	
1999	Rockin' Good Times	Ginger	
2000	Intrepid	Katherine Jessel	
2000	Tycus	Amy Lowe	
2009	Killer Hair	Josette Radford	
2010	Disarmed	Lilian	
2011	Driving by Braille	Beth Allen	
2011	Like Crazy	Liz	
2011	All-Star Superman	Lilo	Voice
2011	Scooby-Doo! Legend of the Phantosaur	Professor Svankmajer	Voice
2013	The Bet		Director and executive producer
2014	Dance-Off	JoAnn	Original title: Platinum the Dance Movie
2017	Byrd and the Bees		Director and executive producer

=== Television ===
Year	Title	Role	Notes
1982	The Kenny Everett Television Show	Various	
1983	The Hot Shoe Show	Dancer	
1987	L.A. Law	Lauren Sevilla	3 episodes
1985–present	General Hospital	Anna Devane / Dr. Liesl Obrecht / Alex Devane	1985–92, 1995, 2006–08, 2012–present (Anna); 2013 (Liesl); 2017, 2019 (Alex)
1992–93	Jack's Place	Chelsea Duffy	18 episodes
1994	Burke's Law	Rhonda Bentley	Episode: "Who Killed Romeo?"
1994	Dream On	Laura North	Episode: "Tis Pity She's a Neighbor"
1993–95	Blossom	Carol	28 episodes
1996	Superman: The Animated Series	Lara Lor-Van	Voice, episode: "The Last Son of Krypton"
1997	Pacific Palisades	Kate Russo	13 episodes
1997	Sunset Beach	Helena Greer	3 episodes
1997	Life with Louie	Miss Robertson	Voice
1998	The Love Boat: The Next Wave	Alison Townsend / Hart-Williams	Episode: "Affairs to Remember"
1999	Tracey Takes On...	Josie	Episode: "Obsession"
1999–2003	All My Children	Alex Devane Marick and Anna Devane	1999–2001 (Alex); 2001–03 (Anna)
2004	Hope & Faith	Herself	2 episodes
1998–2006	Charmed	Patty Halliwell	9 episodes
2008	General Hospital: Night Shift	Anna Devane	4 episodes
2005–08	How Do I Look?	Host	
2010	CSI: NY	Mrs. Christensen	Episode: "Sanguine Love"
2010	Make It or Break It	Viola Pettinger	Episode: "What Are You Made Of?"
2010	Melissa & Joey	Herself	Episode: "Dancing with the Stars of Toledo"
2013–2014	Beware The Batman	Lady Shiva	Voice, 7 episodes
2014–2015	Granite Flats	Avon Lady / Zelda	3 episodes
2020	Good Trouble		Director; episode: "Daylight"

== Awards and nominations ==
List of acting awards and nominations
Year	Award	Category	Title	Result	Ref.
1984	Golden Raspberry Award	Worst Supporting Actress	Staying Alive	Nominated	
1984	Golden Raspberry Award	Worst New Star	Staying Alive	Nominated	
1986	Soap Opera Digest Award	Outstanding Lead Actress: Daytime	General Hospital	Nominated	
1986	Soap Opera Digest Award	Favorite Super Couple: Daytime (shared with Ian Buchanan)	General Hospital	Nominated	
1989	Soap Opera Digest Award	Favorite Super Couple: Daytime (shared with Ian Buchanan)	General Hospital	Nominated	
1989	Soap Opera Digest Award	Outstanding Heroine: Daytime	General Hospital	Nominated	
1990	Daytime Emmy Award	Outstanding Lead Actress in a Drama Series	General Hospital	Nominated	
1990	Soap Opera Digest Award	Outstanding Heroine: Daytime	General Hospital	Won	
1991	Daytime Emmy Award	Outstanding Lead Actress in a Drama Series	General Hospital	Won	
1991	Soap Opera Digest Award	Outstanding Lead Actress: Daytime	General Hospital	Won	
1992	Soap Opera Digest Award	Best Wedding (shared with Tristan Rogers)	General Hospital	Nominated	
1992	Soap Opera Digest Award	Outstanding Lead Actress: Daytime	General Hospital	Nominated	
2000	Daytime Emmy Award	Outstanding Lead Actress in a Drama Series	All My Children	Nominated	
2000	Soap Opera Digest Award	Favorite Return	All My Children	Won	
2002	Daytime Emmy Award	Outstanding Lead Actress in a Drama Series	All My Children	Nominated	
2013	LA Femme Filmmaker Award	Best Feature (Director)	The Bet	Won	
2015	Daytime Emmy Award	Outstanding Supporting Actress in a Drama Series	General Hospital	Nominated	
2016	Daytime Emmy Award	Outstanding Lead Actress in a Drama Series	General Hospital	Nominated	
2017	Daytime Emmy Award	Outstanding Supporting Actress in a Drama Series	General Hospital	Nominated	
2020	Daytime Emmy Award	Outstanding Lead Actress in a Drama Series	General Hospital	Nominated	
2021	Daytime Emmy Award	Outstanding Lead Actress in a Drama Series	General Hospital	Nominated	
2023	Daytime Emmy Award	Outstanding Lead Actress in a Drama Series	General Hospital	Nominated	

== See also ==
- List of dancers
