= The Colony (1995 film) =

- Genre: Drama; Thriller
- Written by: Rob Hedden
- Directed by: Rob Hedden
- Starring: John Ritter; Mary Page Keller; Marshall R. Teague; Todd Jeffries; June Lockhart; Hal Linden
- Music by: Dennis McCarthy
- Country of origin: United States
- Original language: English

Production
- Executive producer: Kevin Kelly Brown
- Producer: Fern Field
- Production location: Rancho Palos Verdes, California
- Cinematography: David Geddes
- Editor: Barry B. Leirer
- Running time: 92 minutes
- Production companies: Kevin Brown Productions; MCA Television Entertainment

Original release
- Network: USA Network
- Release: September 17, 1995

The Colony is a 1995 American made-for-television thriller drama film starring John Ritter, Mary Page Keller, and Hal Linden. The film was written and directed by Rob Hedden.

== Plot ==
Following a carjacking, a man and his family move into an Orwellian-like gated community where the billionaire owner controls the residents' lives. There are draconian rules, armed guards all over, and cameras in all the rooms. Then sinister things begin to happen.

Rick Knowlton is a tech guy that sells smart house technology. To escape the crime ridden Inner City, he makes a deal with a billionaire to put his smart house tech into all the homes in a gated community that the billionaire owns called The Colony.

Knowlton and his family are then invited to come and live in The Colony. Knowlton can't really afford to live in such a nice place, but the nice billionaire helps him make it work. Knowlton and his family move into The Colony into a lovely house far beyond that which he would normally be able to afford. The morning after moving in, Knowlton decides to go for a jog around The Colony with his pet dog and as he is leaving his home he notices that a rule book for living in The Colony has been delivered to his house. The rule book is about as thick as a phone book and Knowlton tells his dog that he will read it later. Little does he know how sinister The Colony really is.

== Cast ==
- John Ritter as Rick Knowlton
- Mary Page Keller as Leslie Knowlton
- Hal Linden as Philip Denig
- Alexandra Picatto as Danielle Knowlton
- Cody Dorkin as Andy Knowlton
- Marshall R. Teague as Doug Corwin
- Todd Jeffries as Mike Knowlton
- June Lockhart as Mrs. Billingsly
- John Wesley as Jerry Franklin
- Frank Bonner as Frank Williamson
- Michele Scarabelli as Sandi Barnett
- Dan Gilvezan as Steve Barnett
- Alla Korot as Jessica James

== Reception ==
=== Critical response ===
Tony Scott of Variety wrote in his review: "June Lockhart, who knows how to handle the role, cunningly dominates the private school system. There's no privacy, and there's a secret attempt by a patrol to search the Ritter family's house for a vital missing computer disk that the former tenants squirreled away before they were sent over a cliff by Teague. [...] Tech credits are good. Main trouble with The Colony is that, as a suspenser, it isn't much fun. Plays like a summer throwaway."

=== Release ===
The Colony was released on September 13, 1995, on the USA Network. The film was released on VHS on March 12, 1996, by Universal Pictures Home Entertainment. It has yet to be released on DVD or video-on-demand.

=== TV Series ===
In 2016, USA Network produced a series of the same name that features a similar premise, but with science fiction elements.
