= Domestic Import =

Domestic Import (alternate title Nanny Insanity)
- Directed by: Kevin Connor
- Written by: Andrea C. Malamut
- Starring: Cynthia Preston; Howard Hesseman; Larry Dorf; Alla Korot; Mindy Sterling
- Cinematography: Barry Wilson
- Music by: Adam Malamut; Jay Asher
- Distributed by: Anchor Bay/Starz
- Release date: 2006
- Running time: 102 min.
- Country: United States
- Language: English

Domestic Import is a 2006 comedy film directed by Kevin Connor and written and produced by Andrea C. Malamut. It stars Cynthia Preston and Larry Dorf. Alla Korot, Howard Hesseman and Mindy Sterling co-star.

== Cast ==
- Cynthia Preston as Marsha McMillian
- Larry Dorf as David McMillian
- Alla Korot as Sophia Petrenko
- Mindy Sterling as Bernice Kimmelman
- Howard Hesseman as Lou Kimmelman
