= Alexandra Picatto =

American actress

- Occupations: Actress, business manager, accountant
- Years active: 1993–2005
- Spouse: Chris Olivero (m. 2006)
- Children: 1
- Website: waverlydrivemgmt.com

Alexandra Picatto is an American business manager, accountant, and former child actress.

== Biography ==
Picatto grew up both in Collinsville and Los Angeles. She was born into an Italian American family. While she was working as an actress, she, her mother and her sister named Antoinette Picatto, also an actress, lived in Los Angeles. In 1992, Picatto was Illinois's Junior Miss. She was discovered by a talent agent from the North Shore Talent Agency at age ten when she took part in a Chicago piano competition in 1993. Picatto began working in commercials and then starred in Kidsongs on PBS. After guest starring on Summerland (TV Series) in 2005, Alexandra retired from acting.

Picatto married Chris Olivero on August 12, 2006, who was an actor in the ABC Family television show Kyle XY. They have one child. Today Alexandra Picatto is an accountant at Waverly Drive Management.

== Filmography ==
- Kidsongs (1993–1995) as herself (sometimes nicknamed Alex Palm)
- Blackbird Hall (1995) as Celia
- Not Like Us (1995) as Elizabeth.
- The Colony (1995) as Danielle Knowlton
- Teen Angel (1997)
- 7th Heaven (1997) as Rita
- Charmed (1999) as Tina Hitchens
- Get Real (1999–2000) as Amy Shepherd.
- Malcolm in the Middle (2000) as Bridget
- Blackout (2001) as Blair Robbins
- Kate Brasher (2001) as Carol Williams
- Getting There (2002) as Charley Simms
- Summerland (2005) as Whitney
