= Carrie Southworth =

American actress (born c. 1978)

- Born: July 15, 1978 (age 48)
- Education: University of Virginia (BA)
- Years active: 2001–present
- Title: Co-founder of TwigTale
- Spouse: Coddy Johnson (m. 2005)
- Relatives: Larry Page (brother-in-law)

Carrie Southworth is an American actress, model, and businesswoman who portrayed Claire Simpson on the SOAPnet prime time serial General Hospital: Night Shift in 2008. She is also the co-founder of a personalized children's book company launched in 2011.

== Early life and education ==
Southworth grew up in Northern Virginia and graduated from the Madeira School in 1995. Southworth spent four years of her childhood living in Dar es Salaam, Tanzania, where her father was posted with the World Bank. She went on to major in chemistry and sciences at the University of Virginia, but later switched her major to economics. She started modeling for Elite Model Management at age 17. In a 2008 interview, Southworth noted, "After I graduated with my economics degree, I had a choice between modeling and working on the bond trading floor at Chase Manhattan Bank. The bank was boring, so I went back to modeling. That led to acting, and here I am!"

== Career ==
In 2008 Southworth landed the contract role of new medical intern Dr. Claire Simpson in the second season of General Hospital: Night Shift, a prime time spin-off of the ABC Daytime soap opera General Hospital. The 13-episode limited series aired from July 22, 2008 to October 14, 2008. Southworth's character also headlined an online series of webisodes called Night Shift: Claire & Kyle, with her Night Shift co-star Adam Grimes in his role of Kyle Julian. The actress had also appeared on General Hospital itself for three episodes in 2006 in the role of Gwen Miller, a minor love interest for one of the later contract roles on Night Shift, Jason Thompson's Patrick Drake.

Southworth has also guest-starred on several television series, including the 2003 Buffy the Vampire Slayer episode "Dirty Girls," Las Vegas (2004/2005), CSI: Miami (2006), Pepper Dennis (2006), Justice (2006) and Rules of Engagement (2007). She appeared in the films The Look (2003), Phat Girlz (2006) and These Days (2006).

In 2011, Southworth cofounded TwigTale, a company which makes customized story books focused on child development that include customer photos and personalized elements.

== Personal life ==
In 2005 Southworth married Collister "Coddy" Johnson III. Coddy's godfather is the former U.S. President George W. Bush, who had been the roommate of the elder Johnson at Yale University. They have two daughters.

Southworth's younger sister, Lucy, is married to Google co-founder Larry Page.

== Filmography ==
=== Film ===
Year	Title	Role	Notes
2001	Soul Survivors	Murdered girl	Uncredited
2003	The Look	India Edwards	
2006	Phat Girlz	Ms. Jungle Fever	
2006	These Days	Christine	

=== Television ===
Year	Title	Role	Notes
2003	Buffy the Vampire Slayer	Betty	Episode: "Dirty Girls"
2004, 2005	Las Vegas	Stella / Wendy Elliot	2 episodes
2006	CSI: Miami	Mia	Episode: "The Score"
2006	Pepper Dennis	Amy	Episode: "Saving Venice"
2006	General Hospital	Dr. Gwen Miller	3 episodes
2006	Justice	Maggie Smart	Episode: "Behind the Orange Curtain"
2007	Rules of Engagement	Tiffany	Episode: "Fix-Ups & Downs"
2008	General Hospital: Night Shift	Dr. Claire Simpson	14 episodes
2009	Castle	Courtney Morantz	Episode: "A Death in the Family"
