= Craig Littler =

English rugby league footballer

Personal information
- Full name: Craig Littler
- Born: 4 September 1985 (age 39); United Kingdom

Playing information
- Position: Centre
Club
| Years | Team | Pld | T | G | FG | P |
|---|---|---|---|---|---|---|
| 2006 | St. Helens | 1 | 1 | 0 | 0 | 4 |
| 2007–10 | Oldham | 50+3 | 17 | 0 | 0 | 68 |
| | Total | 54 | 18 | 0 | 0 | 72 |

Craig Littler (born 4 September 1985) is an English former professional rugby league footballer who played in the 2000s and 2010s. He played at club level for Blackbrook A.R.L.F.C., in the Super League for St. Helens, and in Championship 1 for Oldham, as a centre.

== Playing career ==
He made his solitary first-grade appearance for St. Helens in 2006's Super League XI, when St. Helens put out a largely reserve team in preparation for the 2006 Challenge Cup Final, he played at centre and scored a try in St. Helens' 22-26 defeat by the Catalans Dragons at Stade Gilbert Brutus, Perpignan on Saturday 19 August 2006.
