= Tristan Rogers =

Australian actor (1946–2025)

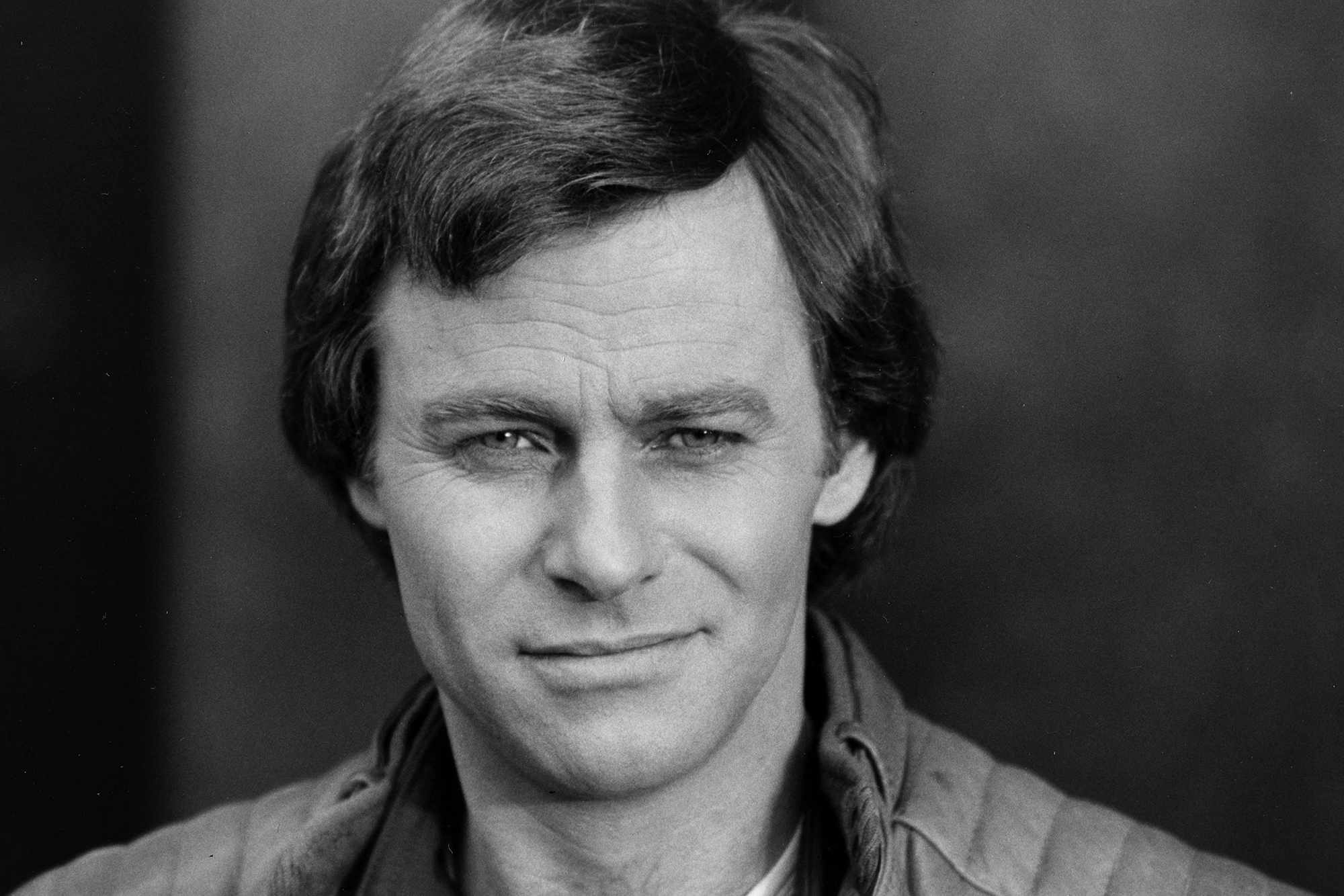
- Rogers in 1982
- Born: 3 June 1946; Melbourne, Victoria, Australia
- Died: 15 August 2025 (aged 79); Palm Springs, California, U.S.
- Occupation: Actor
- Years active: 1970–2025
- Spouses: Barbara Meale (m. 1974; div. 1984) Teresa Parkerson (m. 1995)
- Children: 2

Tristan Rogers (3 June 1946 – 15 August 2025) was an Australian actor. He was best known for playing Robert Scorpio on the ABC soap opera General Hospital and for voicing Jake in Walt Disney Pictures' The Rescuers Down Under.

== Early career ==
Rogers was born in Melbourne on 3 June 1946. His first job was as a draftsman, before he became the lead singer and drummer for pop band Sounds Of The Present. He then moved into acting, and his first role was in the Australian adventure series Hunter, followed by several roles in shows from Crawford Productions. He was a regular in the police drama series The Link Men, which lasted for 13 episodes. In 1968, Rogers moved to London, England to seek work. He returned to Australia in 1974 and completed short stints in soap operas Bellbird, Number 96 (in 1974), and The Box (in 1975). He also had guest roles in programs including Barrier Reef, Division 4, and the 1976 miniseries Power Without Glory. He also appeared in a few British films in the early 1970s, notably Four Dimensions of Greta (1972), The Flesh and Blood Show (1972) and Sex Farm (1973).

In 1978, Rogers and his wife relocated to the United States after he became dissatisfied with the amount of work available in Australia.

== United States roles ==
=== General Hospital ===
After moving to the US, Rogers was told by his agent that he would not find work with his Australian accent, so he worked on developing an American one. However, when he was offered the chance to audition for the ABC soap opera General Hospital, he was told to drop his new American accent. Rogers originally appeared on General Hospital from December 1980 until February 1992. The popularity and longevity of the character Robert Scorpio came as a result of his involvement with the monumentally popular "supercouple" Luke and Laura, whose 1981 wedding brought in 30 million viewers and remains the highest-rated hour in American soap opera history.

While Rogers' Scorpio had been "killed with no body found" when he left the series in 1992, Rogers returned briefly in 1995 as Scorpio's spirit to comfort the character's daughter Robin Scorpio (Kimberly McCullough), who was dealing with the death of her boyfriend to an AIDS-related illness and had learned that she herself was HIV-positive. He returned again in January 2006 for six weeks, this time with Scorpio being very much alive. Rogers reappeared in April 2006 and left again that November.

From 5 August 2008 through 21 October 2008, Rogers reprised the role of Robert Scorpio on the second season of SOAPnet's General Hospital: Night Shift, a primetime spin-off of General Hospital which stars Scorpio's daughter Robin. He was featured in 12 of the season's 14 episodes, and Soap Opera Digest named the appearance their "Best Return" of 2008. Rogers later reappeared on General Hospital for four episodes starting 22 December 2008 as Scorpio attends Robin's wedding.

Rogers returned to General Hospital as Robert Scorpio on 29 February 2012 after Anna Devane (Finola Hughes) called him back to Port Charles to tell him that their daughter Robin Scorpio-Drake had been killed in a lab accident. After seven episodes, he left again on 8 March 2012. Rogers expressed disappointment. He later returned to the series on 15 November 2012 but later departed on 18 December 2012 as his character was drugged into a coma. Rogers reprised the role on 4 October 2013 as part of his on-screen daughter's return. However, on 14 November 2013 it was announced that he would be departing the series to return to The Young and the Restless as Colin Atkinson. He made his last appearance on 30 January 2014.

Rogers returned to the series as Robert Scorpio on 17 December 2015 but he was also portraying Colin on Y&R at the same time. He later left the series on 2 February 2016, although he briefly returned from 26 August to 9 September in the same year.

Rogers returned to General Hospital in April 2018 for a story arc in which he aids Anna Devane who is trying to locate her long lost son Henrik Faison. Henrik is the unknown child that she bore in secret with Cesar Faison. After leaving the show on 1 June 2018, he later returned yet again from 27 July to 12 September in the same year for another story arc where Anna and Finn go missing. He exited the role when Robert left Port Charles on November 12, 2024. He made an unannounced two-day guest return, from 17 to 18 July 2025.

=== The Young and the Restless ===
Rogers returned to daytime television on 8 December 2010 when he joined the cast of The Young and the Restless as Colin Atkinson. He was placed on contract with the show in February 2011. However, Rogers' character was written out of the series in October 2011. He returned to the role briefly in 2012. In 2025, following Rogers' death, the serial announced his final television appearance (as Colin) aired on 26 August of that year.

=== Other roles ===
Rogers starred in the CINE award-winning short Opportunity Knocks for which there are plans to develop into a feature-length film.

He voiced Jake the kangaroo mouse in The Rescuers Down Under, and also gave his voice to the 2015 video game, Mad Max.

From 1997 to 1998, Rogers played bar owner Harry in Fast Track, a series about stock car racing which was filmed in Canada. Since 2010, Rogers starred on the soap opera web series The Bay as Lex Martin. In 2019 he played Doc in the Amazon series, Studio City, a role that garnered him an Emmy for Outstanding Performance by a Supporting Actor in a Digital Drama Series at the 47th Annual Daytime Emmy Awards.

Rogers also did voice-over work representing restaurant chain Outback Steakhouse, Foster's Lager, Reebok, Epson and others.

== Personal life ==
In 1974, Roger married Barbara Meale. The couple divorced in 1984. Following the divorce, he briefly dated his General Hospital co-star Emma Samms. Rogers married Teresa Parkerson in May 1995. They had two children: a daughter Sara Jane (born 1992/3) and son (born 1996/7).

=== Illness and death ===
In July 2025, it was announced Rogers had been diagnosed with lung cancer. He died in Palm Springs, California, on 15 August 2025.

== Filmography ==
=== Film ===
| Year | Title | Role | Notes |
|---|---|---|---|
| 1972 | Four Dimensions of Greta | Hans Wiemer | Feature film |
| 1972 | The Flesh and Blood Show | Tony Weller | Feature film |
| 1973 | Sex Farm | Robert Waitman | |
| 1990 | The Rescuers Down Under | Jake | Voice |
| 1992 | Soulmates | Richard Wayborn | |
| 1993 | Night Eyes 3 | Jim Stanton | Feature film |
| 2000 | A Piece of Eden | Victor Hardwick | Feature film |
| 2008 | Delgo | Nohrin Officer | Voice |
| 2008 | Jack Rio | Morton the Gallery Owner | Feature film |
| 2009 | Opportunity Knocks | Death | Short film |
| 2010 | Raven | Ancient Priest | |
| 2011 | The Los Angeles Ripper | Singing Class Member | |

=== Television ===
| Year | Title | Role | Notes |
|---|---|---|---|
| 1970 | The Link Men | Detective Constable Ray Gamble | TV series |
| 1970–71 | Barrier Reef | | TV series |
| 1974 | Number 96 | Cain Carmichael | TV series |
| 1975 | The Box | Peter Kendall | TV series |
| 1976 | Power Without Glory | | TV miniseries |
| 1977 | Bellbird | | TV series |
| 1978 | The Sullivans | Jenkins | TV series |
| 1980–1992, 1995, 2006, 2008, 2012–2016, 2018–2025 | General Hospital | Robert Scorpio | TV series |
| 1984 | Cover Up | Eric Ducane | Episode: "Death in Vogue" |
| 1989 | Mancuso, F.B.I. | Dennis Grant | Episode: "Betrayal" |
| 1993 | Walker, Texas Ranger | Nash | Episode: "She'll Do to Ride the River With" |
| 1994 | Babylon 5 | Malcolm Biggs | Episode: "The War Prayer" |
| 1996 | The Real Adventures of Jonny Quest | Hawkins | Voice, episode: "Ndovu's Last Journey" |
| 1997–98 | Fast Track | Harry | TV series |
| 1997 | Aaahh!!! Real Monsters | Stig Snowden | Voice, episode: "Showdown" |
| 2000 | Batman Beyond | Simon Harper | Voice, episode: "Sentries of the Last Cosmos" |
| 2008 | General Hospital: Night Shift | Robert Scorpio | TV series |
| 2010 | The Bay | Lex Martin | Web series |
| 2010–2012, 2014–2017, 2019, 2025 | The Young and the Restless | Colin Atkinson | TV series |
| 2019 | Studio City | Doc | |

=== Voiceover work ===
- Outback Steakhouse
- Foster's Lager
- Reebok
- Epson

=== Video games ===
- Mad Max (2015) - Voice
