= Rob Hedden =

American screenwriter and film director (born 1954)

- Born: Los Angeles, California, U.S.
- Education: Brooks Institute
- Occupations: Screenwriter; film director
- Years active: 1989–present

Rob Hedden is an American screenwriter and film director.

== Early life ==
Hedden was born in Los Angeles, California, and raised in Laguna Beach. While a student at Laguna Beach High School, he began making short films. Hedden enrolled at Orange Coast College, studying film and music, subsequently transferring to the Brooks Institute to study film.

== Career ==
After graduating, Hedden worked for around seven years for Universal Studios. He wrote and directed his first feature film Friday the 13th Part VIII: Jason Takes Manhattan (1989), which polarized critics, with Leonard Maltin dubbing it "The best film in the Friday series, imaginatively directed and written by Hedden" yet Entertainment Weekly labeling the film the eighth-worst sequel ever made.

Hedden is known for such films as You May Not Kiss the Bride as well as The Condemned and Clockstoppers, both of which he co-produced. He also wrote and directed the TV movies The Colony, Alien Fury: Countdown to Invasion (2000), directed and co-wrote Dying to Live (1999) and directed the USA TV movies Any Place but Home (1997) and Kidnapped in Paradise (1999). He was interviewed in a 2013 documentary film Crystal Lake Memories: The Complete History of Friday the 13th.

He is a graduate of the Brooks Institute of Photography in Santa Barbara, California.

== Awards ==
What Is Brazil? (1985), his documentary film on the making of Terry Gilliam's acclaimed film Brazil, earned a CINE Eagle Award and a C.I.N.D.Y. Award, and was selected for exhibition at the Smithsonian Institution.

Rob Hedden also wrote, directed and co-produced the independent feature Boxboarders! The comedy won the "Outstanding Achievement in Filmmaking" award at the 2007 Newport Beach Film Festival and was nominated for "Best Picture" at the 2007 Hollywood Giffoni International Film Festival.
