= General Hospital: Night Shift =

- Genre: Soap opera
- Created by: Robert Guza, Jr. Elizabeth Korte
- Written by: Robert Guza, Jr. (2007); Elizabeth Korte (2007); Sri Rao (2008)
- Starring: Sonya Eddy; Kimberly McCullough; Jason Thompson; Billy Dee Williams
- Country of origin: United States
- Original language: English
- No. of seasons: 2
- No. of episodes: 27

Production
- Executive producers: Jill Farren Phelps (2007); Lisa de Cazotte (2008)
- Running time: 45–48 minutes
- Production company: American Broadcasting Companies

Original release
- Network: Soapnet
- Release: July 12, 2007 – October 21, 2008

Related
- General Hospital

General Hospital: Night Shift, stylized as NIGHTSHIFT, is an American prime time serial that first aired on Soapnet for a 27-episode run from July 12, 2007, to October 21, 2008. A spin-off of the ABC Daytime soap opera General Hospital, the show is SOAPnet's first original scripted drama series and follows the nighttime adventures of familiar and new characters around the hospital. As of March 2008, the first season of the series was "SOAPnet's most watched series ever," with ABC Daytime and SOAPnet President Brian Frons noting that Night Shift drew more than 1 million new viewers to the channel during its first season. With its reruns gaining higher ratings than those of General Hospital on SOAPnet, a second season was expected, though Frons noted that the same crew producing two shows had taken its toll.

It was announced in May 2008 that Lisa de Cazotte would serve as Executive producer for season two, joined by Head writer Sri Rao. The 14 new episodes of Night Shift began taping in high-definition in June 2008, with the series airing Tuesdays at 11 p.m. and premiering on July 22, 2008. SOAPnet said the second season "will feature new and returning characters as well as the return of 'legacy' characters from GH. In addition, the continuity between story lines on Night Shift and GH will match." The second season finished its run on October 21, 2008.

Night Shift is the second spin-off series for General Hospital, the first being the 30-minute daytime serial Port Charles, which ran on ABC from June 1997 to October 2003.

Season two of Night Shift also aired on DirecTV's The 101 Network in 2008.

== Overview ==
Prior to its premiere, SOAPnet had announced that Night Shift would "delve deeper into the relationships, friendships and medical cases seen at the hospital." It was noted that unlike General Hospital itself, the stories on Night Shift would be "self-contained and wrap up during each weekly one-hour episode," as well as being "understandable to viewers who do not watch General Hospital." With the goal "to attract younger viewers to both SOAPnet and General Hospital," characters would be "plucked from General Hospital's history" and "be mostly comprised of younger characters with ties to GH's core families." Night Shift's storylines, however, did not directly intersect with those on General Hospital.

== Cast ==
=== Main ===
- Kimberly McCullough as Dr. Robin Scorpio
- Jason Thompson as Dr. Patrick Drake
- Sonya Eddy as Epiphany Johnson
- Billy Dee Williams as Toussaint Dubois
- Dominic Rains (season 1) and Ethan Rains (season 2) as Dr. Leo Julian
- Bradford Anderson as Damien Spinelli (season 1)
- Amanda Baker as Jolene Crowell (season 1)
- Nazanin Boniadi as Leyla Mir (season 1)
- Steve Burton as Jason Morgan (season 1)
- Kent King as Dr. Lainey Winters (season 1)
- Ron Melendez as Dr. Andy Archer (season 1)
- Minae Noji as Dr. Kelly Lee (season 1)
- Angel Wainwright as Regina Thompson (season 1)
- Azita Ghanizada as Dr. Saira Batra (season 2)
- Adam Grimes as Dr. Kyle Julian (season 2)
- Tristan Rogers as Robert Scorpio (season 2)
- Antonio Sabàto, Jr. as Jagger Cates (season 2)
- Carrie Southworth as Dr. Claire Simpson (season 2)

=== Guest ===
- John J. York as Mac Scorpio

==== Season one ====
Actor	Character
Adrian Alvarado	Cruz Rodriguez
Danny Arroyo	Pablo Garcia
Brandon Barash	Johnny Zacchara
Julie Marie Berman	Lulu Spencer
Maurice Benard	Sonny Corinthos
Wendy Braun	Iris Sneed
Dylan Cash	Michael Corinthos
Kiko Ellsworth	Stan Johnson
James Franco	Franco
Richard Gant	Dr. Russell Ford
Jason Gerhardt	Coop Barrett
Rick Hearst	Ric Lansing
Rebecca Herbst	Elizabeth Webber
George Juarez	Morgan Corinthos
Iris and Ivy Kaim	Molly Lansing-Davis
Alla Korot	Stacey Sloan
Lindze Letherman	Georgie Jones
Kali Rodriguez	Kristina Davis
Graham Shiels	Cody Paul
Gregory Siff	Bobby Duncan
Kirsten Storms	Maxie Jones
Roy Vongtama	Dr. Boyd
Bruce Weitz	Anthony Zacchara

==== Season two ====
Actor	Character
Chad Allen	Eric Whitlow
Cameron Boyce	Michael "Stone" Cates Jr.
Leslie Charleson	Dr. Monica Quartermaine
Anthony Geary	Luke Spencer
Finola Hughes	Anna Devane
Kathleen Noone	Patricia Julian
John Reilly	Sean Donely
Sharon Wyatt	Tiffany Hill

== Episodes ==
Season	Episodes	Originally released	
Season	Episodes	First released	Last released
1	13	July 12, 2007	October 4, 2007
2	14	July 22, 2008	October 21, 2008

=== Season 1 (2007) ===
No. overall	No. in season	Title	Directed by	Written by	Original release date
1	1	"Frayed Anatomies"	Owen Renfroe	Robert Guza, Jr. & Elizabeth Korte	July 12, 2007
After treating an indigent patient against hospital policy, Robin and Patrick have been assigned the night shift at General Hospital. An accidental shooting sends Jason and Spinelli to the hospital. Patrick is injured in an explosion and admitted to General Hospital as a patient. Maxie and Coop are caught in a compromising position and Robin is inspired by a pregnant patient.
2	2	"Skin Deep"	William Ludel	Robert Guza, Jr., Elizabeth Korte & Michele Val Jean	July 19, 2007
Jason learns valuable lessons from Toussaint; Epiphany is upset by the news that her son is a catalyst for a strike; Russell laments a recent streak of bad luck at the hospital; and Leo almost commits a career-threatening blunder.
3	3	"Paternity Ward"	William Ludel	Robert Guza, Jr., Elizabeth Korte & Karen Harris	July 26, 2007
Jason spends time with his son when Elizabeth is needed in surgery; Patrick confronts his past while treating a troubled teen; Stan changes his opinion of Toussaint; Cody goes to extremes to get his medication; Andy's methods produce dangerous results in the operating room.
4	4	"Keep the Change"	William Ludel	Robert Guza, Jr., Elizabeth Korte & Garin Wolf	August 2, 2007
A patient's death attracts the unwanted attention of the police; Stan takes the lead in a strike by hospital workers; revelations about Toussaint's past prompt an outburst from Epiphany; Stacey's difficult pregnancy hits home for Robin and Patrick.
5	5	"Bed, Bath and Be Gone"	Owen Renfroe	Robert Guza, Jr., Elizabeth Korte & Meg Bennett	August 9, 2007
Kelly draws Pablo's ire; Patrick and Robin are surprised by the change in a patient's condition; Maxie's infection takes a turn for the worse; and Andy is dubious of a patient's illness.
6	6	"Love's Labors"	Scott McKinsey	Robert Guza, Jr., Elizabeth Korte & Kate Hall	August 16, 2007
Stacey gets trapped in an elevator on her way to an emergency C-section, and Stan and Toussaint scramble to repair it. Elsewhere, Leyla's decision has different consequences for two patients.
7	7	"Mother's Day"	Scott McKinsey	Robert Guza, Jr. & Elizabeth Korte	August 23, 2007
The staff reacts to the fate of Stacey and her baby; Toussaint makes a shocking discovery about the cause of the elevator jam; Patrick helps Leo with a trauma case.
8	8	"Employee of the Month"	Owen Renfroe	Robert Guza, Jr., Elizabeth Korte & Michael Conforti	August 30, 2007
The staff is preoccupied with the recent string of nefarious deeds; Patrick struggles to support Robin in her hour of need; Maxie's condition brings up bad memories for Leo; Russell tries to keep the hospital running amid rumors of a possible takeover; Epiphany holds on to a mysterious package.
9	9	"Gutter Ball"	Owen Renfroe	Robert Guza, Jr. & Elizabeth Korte	September 6, 2007
Insurance complications may prevent a necessary surgery for Lainey's father; Robin makes progress in her efforts to adopt Stacey's baby; Toussaint's mysterious past is disclosed by Epiphany; Jolene plots her next move.
10	10	"Falling Star"	Scott McKinsey	Robert Guza, Jr. & Elizabeth Korte	September 13, 2007
Robin faces a new obstacle in her plans to adopt Stacey's baby; Lovell suggests that Jolene's next victim be a doctor; Regina's low self-esteem begins to interfere with her work.
11	11	"Fools in Love"	William Ludel	Robert Guza, Jr. & Elizabeth Korte	September 20, 2007
Andy and Kelly desperately try to counsel one another on their addictions; Lainey struggles to deal with her father's condition; Patrick comes clean about his fling with Leyla to Robin, who must face up to the fact that Stacey's daughter is going home with the baby's father; Toussaint learns the results of his latest test.
12	12	"What Becomes of the Broken Hearted"	Owen Renfroe	Robert Guza, Jr. & Elizabeth Korte	September 27, 2007
A police investigation into the death of Lainey's father yields an unlikely suspect; Epiphany surprises Toussaint with some unexpected visitors before his difficult surgery; Lovell urges Jolene to find another victim; the clandestine romance between Patrick and Leyla continues.
13	13	"Time Served"	Scott McKinsey	Robert Guza, Jr. & Elizabeth Korte	October 4, 2007
In the first-season finale, Spinelli's sleuthing abilities help Jason stop Jolene from completing her final assignment. Meanwhile, a gunfight erupts in the ER between rival gangs, putting the staff and patients in mortal danger.

=== Season 2 (2008) ===
No. overall	No. in season	Title	Directed by	Written by	Original release date
14	1	"Crash"	Peter Brinckerhoff	Sri Rao & Yolonda Lawrence	July 22, 2008
In the second season premiere, a car crashes into the ER with fatal results and expectant parents Dr. Patrick Drake and Dr. Robin Scorpio are at odds. New interns Claire and Kyle deal with the unpleasant Dr. Leo Julian, and Jagger Cates returns to Port Charles with his son Stone. Guest starring Richard Gant as Dr. Russell Ford.
15	2	"Other People's Children"	Peter Brinckerhoff	Sri Rao & Tamar Laddy	July 29, 2008
Robin uncovers more than she bargains for as she helps a sick child. She soon clashes with Jagger over Stone's unusual behavior as the source of Leo and Kyle's conflict is revealed.
16	3	"Fallen from the Sky"	Peter Brinckerhoff	Sri Rao & Tracey Thomson	August 5, 2008
A new trauma patient turns out to be Robin's father Robert Scorpio. Claire and Kyle disagree about their living arrangements as Leo and Saira dance around their attraction, while Epiphany and Toussaint discuss their relationship. This episode marks the first appearance in the series of Tristan Rogers as Robert Scorpio.
17	4	"We'll Always Have Paris"	Peter Brinckerhoff	Sri Rao & Michele Val Jean	August 12, 2008
18	5	"Family Values"	Peter Brinckerhoff	Sri Rao, Alex Hinton & Andy Wombwell	August 19, 2008
19	6	"Playing With Fire"	Peter Brinckerhoff	Sri Rao & Tamar Laddy	August 26, 2008
20	7	"Listen to My Heart"	Peter Brinckerhoff	Sri Rao & Karen Harris	September 2, 2008
Guest starring John J. York as Mac Scorpio. Billy Dee Williams does not appear in this episode.
21	8	"Pay It Forward"	Peter Brinckerhoff	Sri Rao & Emily Branden	September 9, 2008
22	9	"About a Dad"	Phideaux Xavier	Sri Rao & Emily Branden	September 16, 2008
23	10	"Brothers & Sisters"	Peter Brinckerhoff	Sri Rao & Michael J. Cinquemani	September 23, 2008
Leo and Kyle's mother appears to visit her sons as Claire's secret eats at her. Guest starring Kathleen Noone as Patricia Julian, Chad Allen as Eric Whitlow and Christine Elise McCarthy as Eric’s sister Sylvia.
24	11	"Love/Hate"	Peter Brinckerhoff	Sri Rao & Christiana Miller	September 30, 2008
Guest starring Finola Hughes as Anna Devane and Chad Allen as Eric Whitlow.
25	12	"Truth and Consequences"	Peter Brinckerhoff	Sri Rao & Michael J. Cinquemani	October 7, 2008
Guest starring Finola Hughes as Anna Devane, Chad Allen as Eric Whitlow and Leslie Charleson as Dr. Monica Quartermaine.
26	13	"Past and Presence ~ Part 1"	Peter Brinckerhoff	Sri Rao & Karen Harris	October 14, 2008
A comatose and dying Robert envisions a visit by old friends and loved ones as he loses his will to live. Guest starring Finola Hughes as Anna Devane, Anthony Geary as Luke Spencer, John Reilly as Sean Donely, Sharon Wyatt as Tiffany Hill, John J. York as Mac Scorpio and Chad Allen as Eric Whitlow.
27	14	"Past and Presence ~ Part 2"	Peter Brinckerhoff	Sri Rao	October 21, 2008
In an episode Michael Logan of TV Guide says "ends with some mature, uneasy twists," the aftermath of the explosion outside the hospital plays out as Robert's fate is revealed. Guest starring Finola Hughes as Anna Devane and Leslie Charleson as Dr. Monica Quartermaine.

== Ratings history ==
General Hospital: Night Shift stars, 2007. From left-right: Dr. Patrick Drake (Jason Thompson), Dr. Robin Scorpio (Kimberly McCullough), and Jason Morgan (Steve Burton).

The premiere episode of Night Shift ranked as the SOAPnet's "most viewed telecast ever" with total viewers and in its target demographic, women age 18–49. The show was also SOAPnet's most watched premiere with those groups and with women 18–34. According to Nielsen Media Research, the series averaged 1 million total viewers, "posting 63% audience growth over its lead-in," and ranking as "the second most viewed cable program for the hour with women 18-49." Broadcasting & Cable notes the significance of this fact considering "only 64 million homes carry the network, compared to the 94 million that carry USA, the top network in the demo that night." Night Shift doubled SOAPnet's time-period viewership from 2006 in total viewers and the women 18-49 demographic. The series averaged 833,000 viewers (and 381,000 among women 18–49) during its first season.

== Reception ==
=== Season one ===
In 2007, soap opera critic Marlena De Lacroix noted the initially high ratings but called the series an "incoherently written and produced mess," going on to declare that "Night Shift's only redeeming aspect and its real legacy to daytime is its bravura casting. Casting directors Mark Teschner and Gwen Hillier introduced a group of new actors who are universally talented and interesting. No brainless hunk or hunkette models typically hired en masse." In 2008, Ed Martin called the first season "a perfectly putrid spin-off of a soap opera that is now a mere shadow of its fantastic former self."

=== Season two ===
Martin called the second season "a sophomore series that embodied almost everything that was sublime about its mother-ship back in its heyday." Michael Logan of TV Guide wrote in October 2008 that although he did not enjoy the premiere episode of season two, "then the show got good. Really good." He ranked the spin-off above General Hospital itself, saying "it's indisputably superior to the mob-infested soap that spawned it." Logan added that "This late-night SOAPnet series is refreshingly retro, focusing as GH once did on the lives of doctors and their patients. (Imagine that!) The pleasures are many, from the frisky interplay of interns Claire and Kyle (she's straight, he's not) to the profoundly moving performances of Finola Hughes and Tristan Rogers as Anna and her cancer-stricken Robert." Michael Fairman called Rogers' performance "poignant" and noted that "if it could have been in Emmy contention this year, it would stand among the best." Rogers himself said of the season, "Night Shift was a wonderful glimpse of what was possible to do with a daytime format and a prime time format, shot in HD, edited like a movie, and essentially brought up to date, which was subtle. It was written by Sri Rao, who really understood the genre. He really got it ... I think this is an issue of what goes on with the daytime soaps. There are not too many people out there now who want to take what history there is, and take it and build on it. I can see why they don’t want to do that, but on the other hand, I don’t think there is much point in changing history for the sake of change. If you have a really good reason to change it then do it, otherwise use it!" De Lacroix wrote that season two "expertly delivered traditional soap opera in a modern form while reinforcing love as the center of the medium, instead of devaluing it as so many soaps do today," adding that "All the characters on NS2 were intelligent adults, the way they used to be on soap operas before about a decade ago when most characters were rendered brainless and stupid."

== DVD release ==
The complete first season of Night Shift was released on DVD on February 12, 2008.
