= Dominic Rains =

Iranian-born American actor

- Born: Amin Nazemzadeh; March 1, 1982 (age 44); Tehran, Iran
- Occupation: Actor
- Years active: 2003–present
- Relatives: Ethan Rains (brother)

Dominic Rains (Persian: دومنیک رینس; born Amin Nazemzadeh, امین ناظم زاده, March 1, 1982) is an Iranian-American actor, best known for his roles in independent films, including The Taqwacores (2010), A Girl Walks Home Alone at Night (2014), as well as Dr. Crockett Marcel in Chicago Med and as Kasius in the fifth season of Agents of S.H.I.E.L.D.

== Biography ==
Rains was born in Tehran, Iran, moved to London, England, as a young child and then to the United States, where he was raised in Dallas, Texas. Rains attended The Colony High School (The Colony, TX). He is the younger brother of actor Ethan Rains. Rains began his acting career starring in the well-known TV Movie, Saving Jessica Lynch in 2003. He later appeared in 2006 in the popular TV movie, Flight 93. From July 12 to October 4, 2007, Rains appeared as Dr. Leo Julian in SOAPnet's General Hospital: Night Shift, a 13-episode prime time spin-off of the ABC daytime soap opera General Hospital. The character had first been introduced on General Hospital on July 2, 2007. With Rains unavailable for the series' second season in July 2008, his brother Ethan was cast in the role starting July 22, 2008. Following his role in General Hospital, he has continued to appear in a number of television series including 24, Flash Forward, Burn Notice, NCIS, Cane and Anger Management.

In 2010, he gained recognition for his role in the discussion-sparking independent film The Taqwacores based on a 2004 novel by an American convert to Islam, Michael Muhammad Knight. The New York Times praised his performance as "particularly eye-catching" and NBC reviewed that his role is "reminiscent of Adrien Brody's career-launching turn in Summer of Sam. Rains is just operating at an entirely higher level as the heart and soul of this film." This role also won him an award for best actor at the Festival de Cine Internacional de Ourense international film festival.

Later in 2010, he began filming and starring as the lead role in Exxodus Pictures' supernatural thriller Jinn. The film was released nationwide in April 2014. He played Shawn Walker, a young automotive designer from Detroit who uncovers an ancient secret that threatens to wipe out his entire family.

Rains appeared as Saeed in the Sundance Film Festival favorite horror film A Girl Walks Home Alone at Night. Highly praised by many critics after its debut, it was acquired by Kino Lorber for mainstream US distribution and released in late 2014. "This stunning and stinging cinematic marvel left us speechless at its premiere," wrote founder Richard Lorber.

Also in 2014, Rains collaborated on a short film written and directed with his brother Ethan, Still Here with Shohreh Aghdashloo and Alan Rosenberg, that was inspired by real life events of their cousin who was fatefully misdiagnosed with cancer. The film is produced by the Rains Brothers in association with Exxodus Pictures.

In 2019, Rains began starring in the NBC medical drama Chicago Med in the fifth season as Dr. Crockett Marcel, a new trauma surgeon to the hospital. Coming straight from New Orleans as an amazing yet reckless surgeon, and stirring many changes as he becomes accustomed to Chicago and his new setting, his cavalier attitude takes the reins and causes him, and others, to continually get into hot water.

Besides television and film, Rains is active in the Los Angeles theater community and is a member of the Los Angeles-based Elephant Theatre Company. He has appeared on stage with the Elephants in the critically acclaimed productions of Desert Sunrise, Block Nine, Love Sick, Baby Doll, Cycles, and The North Plan.

== Filmography ==
=== Film ===
Year	Title	Role
2006	Poet's War	Hamad
2006	Grenade	Corporal Serri
2010	The Taqwacores	Jehangir Tabari
2011	Jinn	Shawn Walker
2014	Captain America: The Winter Soldier	CIA Instructor
2014	A Girl Walks Home Alone at Night	Saeed
2016	Burn Country	Osman
2016	Chee and T	T
2018	A.X.L.	Andric

=== Television ===
Year	Title	Role	Notes
2003	Saving Jessica Lynch	Fedayeen Officer	
2004–2005	LAX	Cyrus	Recurring role, 5 episodes
2005	24	Naji	Episode: "Day 4: 7:00 p.m.-8:00 p.m."
2006	E-Ring	Omar Al-Masadi	Episode: "Brothers in Arms"
2006	Flight 93	Ziad Jarrah	TV movie
2006	Courting Alex	Sammy	Recurring role, 2 episodes
2006	Related	Shahab	Episode: "The Godmother"
2007	NCIS	Jamal Malik	Episode: "Grace Period"
2007	Sharpshooter	Aiig	TV movie
2007	General Hospital: Night Shift/General Hospital	Dr. Leo Julian	Recurring role, 49 episodes
2008	Final Approach	Abu Karlin	TV movie
2009-2010	FlashForward	Khamir Dejan	Recurring role, 5 episodes
2012	Burn Notice	Sharif Damour	Episode: "Last Rites"
2014	Anger Management	Mahesh	Episode: "Charlie and the Last Temptation of Eugenio"
2017-2018	Agents of S.H.I.E.L.D.	Kasius	Recurring role, 8 episodes
2019–2024	Chicago Med	Dr. Crockett Marcel	Main role
2019–2024	Chicago Fire	Dr. Crockett Marcel	Recurring role
2019	Chicago P.D.	Dr. Crockett Marcel	1 episode
2020	Tales from the loop	2 episodes	
