= Kimberly McCullough =

American actress (born 1978)

- Born: Bellflower, California, U.S.
- Occupations: Actress; director
- Years active: 1984–present
- Children: 1

Kimberly McCullough is an American actress and television director. She is best known for her role as Robin Scorpio on the soap opera General Hospital, a role which she originated at age seven, playing the character on and off from 1985 to 2000 and 2004 to 2018, in addition to 2021. She has subsequently taken a step back from acting in order to focus on directing.

McCullough has also played the character in one episode of the GH spinoff Port Charles, and in a few episodes of All My Children. In 2007 and 2008, she portrayed Robin as one of the leading characters in the primetime GH spinoff, General Hospital: Night Shift.

McCullough is also an ABC Director Fellow, shadowing other directors.

== Career ==
In 1985, after failing to land a role on the TV sitcom Webster, McCullough auditioned for the role of Robin Scorpio, the 6-year-old daughter of Robert Scorpio (Tristan Rogers) and Anna Devane (director/actress Finola Hughes). The producers made her audition 12 times but eventually gave her the part and her role became a popular success.

In the fall of 1985, McCullough made her debut during the Asian Quarter storyline, which showcased her acting skills alongside veteran actor Keye Luke through the majority of the storyline. In 1989 at the age of 11, McCullough won her first Daytime Emmy Award, for "Outstanding Juvenile Female in a Drama Series". One of her most memorable storylines began in 1995, when her teenage character contracted HIV after having unprotected sex with her boyfriend Stone, who was unknowingly infected with the virus and later died of AIDS. She won a second Daytime Emmy in 1996 for this storyline, once again for "Outstanding Younger Leading Actress in a Drama Series". In 1996, she took a short break from playing the character when she went off to college for a brief stint at New York University Tisch School of the Arts from 1996 to 1997, although she never graduated or received a degree from the university. On General Hospital, Robin Scorpio was also written out for the same reason, except the character was attending Yale University to study medicine. Unlike many soap opera characters, her character of Robin Scorpio has never been "sorased" but has aged in real time along with McCullough.

In 1998, she returned to the show, but then left once again to pursue other acting opportunities, which included co-starring in the primetime drama series Once and Again and Joan of Arcadia. She also wrote and directed the mockumentary Lil Star about girls in childhood beauty pageants, a story which allowed McCullough to draw on her own experiences. In 2001 she appeared in the movie Legally Blonde as Amy, one of Elle Woods' sorority sisters. After brief returns to General Hospital in 2000 and 2004, she returned on a permanent basis in October 2005, with her character Robin Scorpio a doctor, having graduated from medical school. In November 2011, McCullough announced her plans to leave General Hospital once again in order to pursue a career as a director, and her character was believed to have died on February 21, 2012. However, scenes airing on March 27, 2012, showed Robin to be alive and held captive in an undisclosed location, leaving the door open for her to return in the future. Starting in July 2012, McCullough made several guest appearances on General Hospital, and returned to the role in 2013.

She again went off contract in 2018, announcing her retirement from acting to focus on a directing career. McCullough did make an appearance in 2021 to participate in an on-air tribute for actor John Reilly, who played Sean Donely.

In 2011, McCullough directed the short film Nice Guys Finish Last. The film starred Danielle Harris and McCullough's General Hospital co-star Lexi Ainsworth.

== Personal life ==
McCullough was born in Bellflower, California. She has two older brothers and is of Mexican descent. Her mother is a dance teacher, who took her to rehearsals, and got her involved with acting. McCullough's first appearance was as a 7-month-old baby in a diaper commercial, co-starring with actress Juliet Mills. She started doing gymnastics at the age of 4, and performed as part of a group called the Gym Dandies. McCullough followed this up with a dancing part in Breakin' 2: Electric Boogaloo. McCullough dated actor Freddie Prinze Jr. from 1996 until 1999.

In a year-end blog post for 2015, McCullough revealed she had a miscarriage. In her 2016 Year End Wrap Up, she revealed she was pregnant again after her miscarriage. McCullough gave birth to her son, Otis, on June 7, 2017.

== Filmography ==
=== Film ===
Year	Title	Role	Notes	Ref.
1984	Breakin' 2: Electric Boogaloo	Kimberly		
1988	Purple People Eater	Donna Orfus		
1991	Bugsy	Barbara Siegel		
1992	Consenting Adults	Lori Parker		
2001	Legally Blonde	Amy		
2005	Greener Mountains	Alice		
2012	Among Friends	Director's Girlfriend		

=== Television ===
Year	Title	Role	Notes
1985–2000; 2004–2018; 2021	General Hospital	Robin Scorpio	Series regular; guest appearances
1987	Beauty and the Beast	Abbey	Episode: "Masques"
1992	Consenting Adults	Lori Parker	Television film
1996	CBS Schoolbreak Special	April Morgan	Episode: "Crosstown"
1997	Nothing Sacred	Flavia	Episode: "Speaking in Tongues"
1998	Port Charles	Robin Scorpio	1 episode
1999	Sons of Thunder	Jennifer Hobson	Episode: "Underground"
1999	Undressed	N/A	Episode: unaired pilot
1999–2000	Once and Again	Jennifer	Recurring role, 9 episodes
2000	Party of Five	Phoebe	Episode: "Taboo or Not Taboo"
2001	DAG	Becky Jo Jensen	Episode: "America's Sweetheart"
2001	ER	Nori	Episode: "Fear of Commitment"
2001	Dying to Dance	Alyssa Lennox	Television film
2001	All My Children	Robin Scorpio	Guest appearances
2002	Judging Amy	Melissa Johnston	Episode: "Who Shot Dick?"
2002	Crossing Jordan	Isabelle	Episode: "Four Fathers"
2002	Family Law	Carly Sifton	Episode: "Big Brother"
2002	The Shield	Deena	Episodes: "Blowback", "Pay in Pain"
2003	Firefly	Chari	Episode: "Heart of Gold"
2004	CSI: Crime Scene Investigation	Vampire #3	Episode: "Suckers"
2004	The Stones	Audra	4 episodes
2004	The Shield	Deena	Episode: "Streaks and Tips"
2004–2005	Joan of Arcadia	Beth Reinhart	Recurring role, 6 episodes
2007–2008	General Hospital: Night Shift	Robin Scorpio	Series regular
2008	The Shield	Deena	Episode: "Game Face"
2010	Fake It Til You Make It	Decoy	Episode: "Wayne Brady Tweets"

=== As a director ===
Year	Title	Notes
2013	Shake It Up	Episode: "Haunt It Up"
2015	K.C. Undercover	Episode: "Operation: Other Side Part 2"
2016	Pretty Little Liars	2 episodes
2018	Youth & Consequences	Miniseries; 2 episodes
2018	All About The Washingtons	2 episodes
2018	Fuller House	Episode: "It’s Always Open"
2018–2019	One Day at a Time	3 episodes
2018–2019	The Conners	2 episodes
2019	The Cool Kids	Episode: "The Cool Kids Un-Retire"
2019	It's Always Sunny in Philadelphia	Episode: "Paddy's Has a Jumper"
2019–2023	High School Musical: The Musical: The Series	14 episodes
2019–2020	The Bold Type	3 episodes
2020	Carol's Second Act	Episode: "Blocking"
2020	Almost Family	Episode: "Permanent AF"
2020	Roswell, New Mexico	Episode: "I'll Stand By You"
2021	Fantasy Island	Episode: "Quantum Entanglement"
2021	With Love	Episode: "Valentine's Day"
2022	How I Met Your Father	Episode: "'The Fixer"
2022	Boo, Bitch	3 episodes
2023	Neon	2 episodes
2025	Vampirina: Teenage Vampire	Episode: "First Year to Watch"

== Awards ==
All of McCullough's awards and nominations have been for her role as Robin Scorpio on General Hospital.

=== Won ===
- (1986) Young Artist Award, Outstanding Young Actress – Regular Daytime Serial
- (1986) Soap Opera Digest Award, Outstanding Youth Actor/Actress on a Daytime or Prime Time Serial
- (1986) Young Artist Award, Exceptional Performance by a Young Actress in a Daytime Series
- (1989) Daytime Emmy, Outstanding Younger Actress in a Drama Series
- (1993) Soap Opera Digest Awards, Outstanding Child Actor
- (1996) Daytime Emmy, Outstanding Younger Actress in a Drama Series

=== Nominated ===
- (1988) Young Artist Award, Best Young Actress Starring in a Television Drama Series
- (1989) Young Artist Award, Best Young Actress in a Daytime Drama Series
- (1989) Young Artist Award, Best Young Actress in Theater
- (1990) Young Artist Award, Best Young Actress in a Daytime Drama Series
- (1990) Daytime Emmy, Outstanding Younger Actress in a Drama Series
- (1991) Daytime Emmy, Outstanding Younger Actress in a Drama Series
- (1992) Soap Opera Digest Award, Outstanding Younger Leading Actress: Daytime
- (1995) Daytime Emmy, Outstanding Younger Actress in a Drama Series
- (1997) YoungStar Award, Best Performance by a Young Actress in a Daytime TV Program
- (1997) Young Artist Award, Best Performance in a Daytime Drama – Young Actress
- (1997) Daytime Emmy, Outstanding Younger Actress in a Drama Series
