= Lois Riess =

American convicted murderer

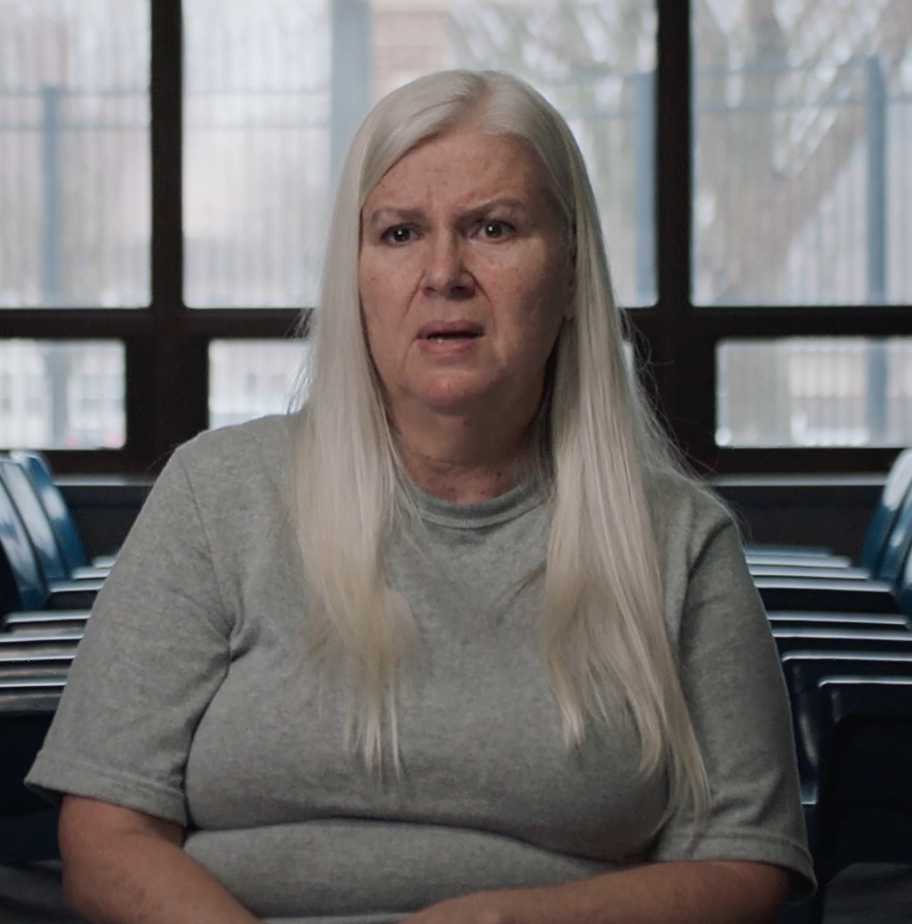
- Born: Lois Ann Witte; February 28, 1962 (age 64); Rochester, Minnesota, United states
- Other names: Killer Grandma; Losing Streak Lois (Note: Nickname given to her by the media)
- Spouse: David Riess (m. 1986–2018)
- Children: 3, including Braden
- Parent(s): William "Bill" Witte (father); Donna Witte (mother)
- Status: Incarcerated at MCF Shakopee
- Convictions: 2 counts of first-degree murder
- Penalty: 2 life sentences without the possibility of parole

Details
- Span of crimes: 2018–2018
- Country: U.S.
- States: Minnesota; Florida
- Killed: 2: David Riess; Pamela Hutchinson
- Weapon: Pistol
- Date apprehended: August 11, 2018

Lois Ann Riess (née Witte; born February 28, 1962) is an American murderer and former fugitive. She gained nationwide notoriety in 2018 after being charged with the murder of her husband in Minnesota and a woman in Florida, resulting in a United States-wide manhunt. The media nicknamed her the "Killer Grandma" and "Losing Streak Lois." Riess' case made headlines due to its shocking details and her ability to elude law enforcement for weeks.

After leaving Minnesota, Riess went to Florida, where she was accused of becoming friends with Pamela Hutchinson, a woman who resembled her physically. Riess killed Hutchinson to try to assume her identity in order to avoid the police as well. With Hutchinson's identification and credit cards, she moved from state to state until being caught in April 2018 on South Padre Island, Texas.

Riess was convicted of both counts of murder and was sentenced to 2 life terms in prison (one for killing her husband, and one for killing Pamela Hutchinson) with no parole. And has been serving two life terms at Minnesota Correctional Facility – Shakopee since 11 August 2020.

The case has been featured in documentaries, podcasts, and widespread media coverage, with discussions focusing on identity theft, crimes against the elderly, and the difficulties involved in tracking fugitives.

== Early life ==
Lois Riess was born in Rochester, Minnesota, in the early 1960s and was the fourth of five siblings. Riess's mother, Donna Witte (née Woolley; 1954–1998) (Note: As metioned on Ranfranz and Vine Funeral home (Obituary)) had a hoarding disorder that made Riess abashedly self-conscious during all her high school years and refused even to let Riess host friends at their home. Donna also had schizophrenia and bipolar disorder. Her father, William "Bill" Witte,(1927–2014 (Note: As metioned on Ranfranz and Vine Funeral home (Obituary))) was an IBM engineer. The home life was unstable, with little discipline or affection. In spite of all this hardship, Riess and her siblings grew close and looked out for each other during tough times. She quit Mayo High School after the 11th grade.

She married David Riess when she was 20 years old, and in 2005 the pair settled in Blooming Prairie, Minnesota, after moving from their hometown of Rochester, establishing what seemed to be a stable life together. She had two sons Braden Robert (1986–2021 (Note: Braden Robert Riess, died in Rochester on November 9, 2021, at the age of 35.)), Bill and a daughter, Bria. The family maintained a worm farm business, which gave the family a meager but secure income. Lois Riess was known to be an avid gambler, which eventually became an addiction.

In 2015, Dodge County authorities in Minnesota launched an investigation into Riess after evidence came to light that she had embezzled tens of thousands of dollars from her disabled sister's accounts. Court records showed that Riess took advantage of her position as guardian, draining money to feed her gambling addiction. A review revealed certain transactions, such as money paid to a deceased relative, "guardian fee" withdrawals for personal spending worth $8,500, and $15,000 paid as supposed gift-giving to nieces and nephews. The bulk of the stolen funds was traced to casino spending in accordance with Riess's long-documented gambling addiction.

In September 2015, a social worker petitioned in emergency to terminate Riess's guardianship upon the discovery of these inconsistencies. No prosecution ensued at the time despite considering criminal charges of felony theft by law enforcement. A civil judgment instead was rendered in 2017 that had Riess pay back $100,534 to her sister. This amount remained unpaid as of her subsequent criminal behavior in 2018, based on court documents.

== Crimes ==
=== Murder of David Riess ===
Publicity photo of David Riess

David Riess (Note: Full name by birth: David Leonard Riess) was found dead on March 23, 2018, at their home in Blooming Prairie, Minnesota. The 54-year-old was discovered by authorities after concerned family members reported they had not heard from him in several days. Upon investigation, David was found with multiple gunshot wounds, and his death was quickly ruled a homicide. Lois Riess was identified as the primary suspect after she went missing shortly after the murder, along with her husband's vehicle and significant funds from his bank account.

Authorities determined that Lois Riess had forged David's signature on checks and withdrawn $11,000 from his account before fleeing the state. Evidence collected at the scene suggested the crime was premeditated, with Lois allegedly planning to use the stolen funds to finance her escape. Neighbors and acquaintances described David as a kind and well-liked man, with no prior indications of trouble in the marriage. However, Lois's escalating gambling debts was considered potential motives for the crime.

=== Murder of Pamela Hutchinson ===
Publicity photo of Pamela Hutchinson

Pamela Diane Hutchinson (Note: Full name by birth: Pamela Diane Sellers Hutchinson) was a 59-year-old native of Columbus County, North Carolina.

After leaving Minnesota, Lois Riess was captured on surveillance video at Smokin' Oyster Brewery in Fort Myers Beach. On April 5, 2018, she murdered 59-year-old Pamela Hutchinson in a rental condo located in Fort Myers Beach, Florida. Hutchinson was visiting the area to help a friend scatter her late husband's ashes and on vacation when she encountered Riess. Investigators determined that Riess targeted Hutchinson because they shared a similar physical appearance, intending to steal her identity to evade authorities. Riess befriended Hutchinson, gaining her trust through friendly interactions and social outings in the days leading up to the murder. The relationship appeared to be amicable, with Hutchinson reportedly unaware of Riess's criminal intentions.

Riess shot and killed Hutchinson in the victim's condo, where her body was later discovered with bullets in her back and chest a week later by maintenance staff, investigating a water-related problem in the building, had been conducting door-to-door checks when they detected a strong, unpleasant odor emanating from the unit, indicating a serious issue. After the murder, Riess stole several of Hutchinson's belongings, including her identification, credit cards, and vehicle, which she used to aid her escape. Investigators believed that Riess meticulously planned the crime to assume Hutchinson's identity as part of her effort to avoid detection following the murder of her husband in Minnesota.

== Fugitive and arrest ==
Mug shot of Lois Riess

Following the murder, Riess was captured on surveillance footage using Hutchinson's identification and credit cards to make various purchases. Riess also drove Hutchinson's white Acura TL across state lines. Riess evaded law enforcement for weeks, traveling across the southern United States and staying in various hotels and casinos, while her case was featured on programs such as Dateline NBC and ABC's 20/20. The stolen items and vehicle played a crucial role in helping authorities trace Riess's movements.

"This case from the very beginning struck at me as odd," "We look at her appearance ... she looks like anybody’s mother or grandmother, yet she’s an absolute cold-blooded murderer

— Florida's Lee County Undersheriff Carmine Marceno
Approximate location of Riess's arrest
1 Riess is sitting at the restaurant called Sea Ranch. in South Padre Island, Texas, 27 miles from the Mexican border

On the night of April 19, 2018, Riess was arrested and taken into custody by U.S. Marshals and local law enforcement at a local restaurant called Sea Ranch in South Padre Island, Texas, a coastal town situated about 27 miles from the Mexican border. She was sitting alone at a restaurant having a drink when authorities approached her. Her capture followed a tip from an individual who recognized her from news reports while she was at a local restaurant. She was taken into custody without incident and extradited to Florida to face charges. Authorities recovered the white Acura TL taken from Hutchinson, along with several forms of identification belonging to the victim. Two handguns were also discovered in the motel room where Riess was reportedly staying in South Padre Island. Prior to her arrest, the Dodge County Sheriff's Office in Minnesota released surveillance footage from a gas station in Northwood, Iowa, recorded the previous month. The video showed Riess purchasing a sandwich and asking for directions heading south out of the state.

=== Legal proceedings ===
After her arrest, Riess was held in Texas before being extradited to Florida to face charges for the murder of Pamela Hutchinson. In December 2019, Riess pleaded guilty in Florida to four charges, including first-degree murder, grand theft, and identity theft, in connection with Hutchinson's death. In exchange for her guilty plea, the state withdrew its pursuit of the death penalty, and Riess was sentenced to life in prison without parole. The Florida trial also resolved any potential appellate issues, ensuring she would remain incarcerated for life.

After her sentencing in Florida, Riess was extradited to Minnesota to face charges for the murder of her husband.

In August 2020, trial proceedings and a subsequent guilty plea were conducted within the auditorium of a school facility in Kasson, Minnesota. The Dodge County District Court designated this unconventional venue in response to public health requirements imposed during the COVID-19 pandemic, as prevailing social distancing protocols necessitated a space of greater capacity than a standard courtroom could provide. She pleaded guilty to first-degree murder, receiving another life sentence without the possibility of parole.

During her court appearance, Riess expressed remorse to her late husband's family, acknowledging the pain caused by her actions. The prosecution underscored the calculated nature of Riess's crimes, highlighting her use of the same firearm for both murders and her efforts to evade capture through identity theft. Riess was at one time incarcerated in a Florida state prison, serving her life sentences. For each murder, Lois Riess was handed a life sentence. Due to an agreement between Florida and Minnesota, officials settled on Lois Riess serving both sentences in Minnesota.

== Media coverage and legacy ==
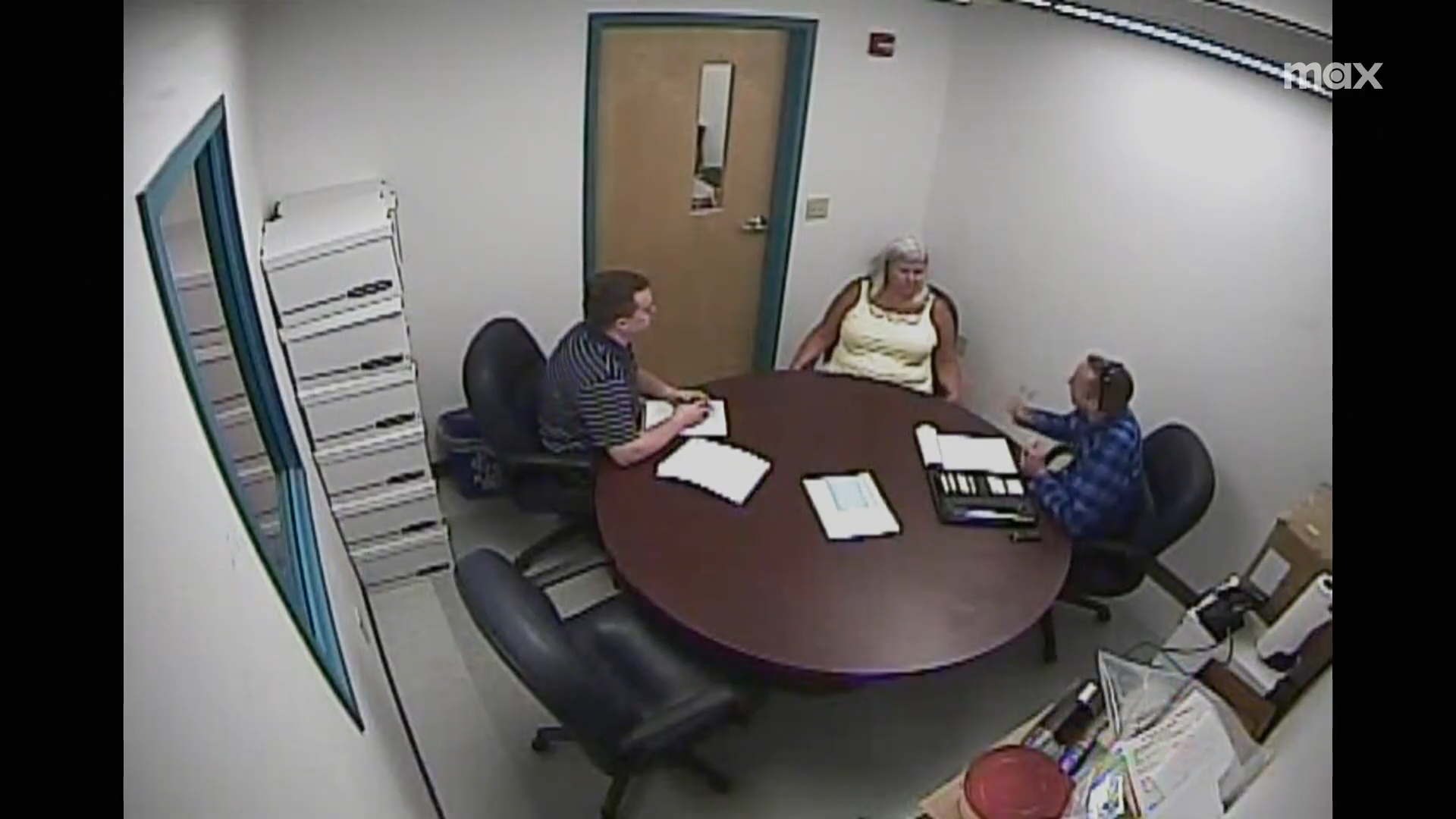
Screenshot of Riess during her interrogation, as featured in I Am Not a Monster: The Lois Riess Murders

- In 2024, Riess was featured in a documentary directed and produced by Erin Lee Carr, I Am Not a Monster: The Lois Riess Murders, American Murderers on HBO.
- ABC's 20/20: The Killer Grandma.
- Dateline NBC: The Woman at the Bar.

=== Podcast ===
- #256 "Losing Streak Lois"
- Episode 104: The Killer Grandma of Minnesota
- The Murders of Lois Riess
- 32. Lois Riess—The Worm Has Turned
