= Track Star =

A track star is a competitor in the sport of athletics.

Track Star or Track Stars may also refer to:

- Track Star (web series), a musical quiz show
- "Track Star" (song), an R&B/trap song by Mooski
- Track Stars: The Unseen Heroes of Movie Sound, a 1979 documentary film

== See also ==
- The Trak Starz, an American hip-hop production duo
- Trackstarz, a production team known for their 2011 cover of the song "Grenade"
- Stars of Track and Field, an indie rock band
