= List of ended Hulu original programming =

These original Hulu shows have either completed their runs or stopped producing episodes. A show is also assumed to have ended if there has been no confirmed news of renewal at least one year after the show's last episode was released.

== Drama ==
Title	Genre	Premiere	Finale	Seasons	Length	Notes
East Los High	Teen drama	June 3, 2013	December 1, 2017	5 seasons, 61 episodes	22–24 min	
11.22.63	Science fiction thriller	February 15, 2016	April 4, 2016	8 episodes	44–81 min	(Note: Miniseries)
The Path	Drama	March 30, 2016	March 28, 2018	3 seasons, 36 episodes	45–56 min	
Freakish	Horror	October 10, 2016	October 18, 2017	2 seasons, 20 episodes	22–24 min	
Chance	Crime drama	October 19, 2016	November 29, 2017	2 seasons, 20 episodes	41–50 min	
Shut Eye	Drama	December 7, 2016	December 6, 2017	2 seasons, 20 episodes	40–42 min	
The Handmaid's Tale	Dystopian drama	April 26, 2017	May 27, 2025	6 seasons, 66 episodes	44–64 min	
Marvel's Runaways	Superhero teen drama	November 21, 2017	December 13, 2019	3 seasons, 33 episodes	46–53 min	(Note: These shows were available at a time as Hulu originals, but have been since removed from the service.)
The Looming Tower	Political drama	February 28, 2018	April 18, 2018	10 episodes	50–51 min	
Castle Rock	Psychological horror anthology	July 25, 2018	December 11, 2019	2 seasons, 20 episodes	35–60 min	
Into the Dark	Horror anthology	October 5, 2018	March 26, 2021	2 seasons, 24 episodes	81–93 min	
Light as a Feather	Supernatural thriller	October 12, 2018	October 4, 2019	2 seasons, 26 episodes	22–25 min	
The Act	True crime drama	March 20, 2019	May 1, 2019	8 episodes	48–60 min	
Wu-Tang: An American Saga	Drama	September 4, 2019	April 5, 2023	3 seasons, 30 episodes	41–58 min	
Looking for Alaska	Teen drama	October 18, 2019		8 episodes	48–57 min	
Reprisal	Drama	December 6, 2019		1 season, 10 episodes	41–57 min	
Devs	Science fiction drama	March 5, 2020	April 16, 2020	8 episodes	43–57 min	(Note: Part of FX on Hulu.)
Little Fires Everywhere	Drama	March 18, 2020	April 22, 2020	8 episodes	53–60 min	
Mrs. America	Historical drama	April 15, 2020	May 27, 2020	9 episodes	43–48 min	
Love, Victor	Romantic drama	June 17, 2020	June 15, 2022	3 seasons, 28 episodes	24–34 min	
Monsterland	Horror anthology	October 2, 2020		1 season, 8 episodes	42–53 min	
Helstrom	Superhero horror	October 16, 2020		1 season, 10 episodes	44–55 min	
A Teacher	Drama	November 10, 2020	December 29, 2020	10 episodes	21–29 min	
American Horror Stories	Horror anthology	July 15, 2021	October 15, 2024	3 seasons, 24 episodes	38–49 min	
Nine Perfect Strangers	Drama	August 18, 2021	May 21, 2025	2 seasons, 16 episodes	42–55 min	
Y: The Last Man	Science fiction drama	September 13, 2021	November 1, 2021	1 season, 10 episodes	47–54 min	
The Premise	Anthology	September 16, 2021	October 7, 2021	1 season, 5 episodes	28−33 min	
Dopesick	Drama	October 13, 2021	November 17, 2021	8 episodes	57–63 min	
Pam & Tommy	Biographical drama	February 2, 2022	March 9, 2022	8 episodes	43–51 min	
The Dropout	True crime drama	March 3, 2022	April 7, 2022	8 episodes	45–55 min	
The Girl from Plainville	True crime drama	March 29, 2022	May 3, 2022	8 episodes	41–49 min	
Under the Banner of Heaven	True crime drama	April 28, 2022	June 2, 2022	7 episodes	63−68 min	
Candy	True crime drama	May 9, 2022	May 13, 2022	5 episodes	48−55 min	
Pistol	Biographical drama	May 31, 2022		6 episodes	45−56 min	
Mike	Biographical drama	August 25, 2022	September 15, 2022	8 episodes	21–33 min	
The Patient	Psychological thriller	August 30, 2022	October 25, 2022	10 episodes	21–46 min	
Tell Me Lies	Drama	September 7, 2022	February 17, 2026	3 seasons, 26 episodes	47–67 min	
Fleishman Is in Trouble	Drama	November 17, 2022	December 29, 2022	8 episodes	45–61 min	
Welcome to Chippendales	Biographical drama	November 22, 2022	January 3, 2023	8 episodes	35–46 min	
Kindred	Science fiction drama	December 13, 2022		1 season, 8 episodes	36–54 min	
Tiny Beautiful Things	Drama	April 7, 2023		8 episodes	26–32 min	
Saint X	Psychological drama	April 26, 2023	May 31, 2023	8 episodes	42–53 min	
Class of '09	Crime thriller	May 10, 2023	June 21, 2023	8 episodes	37–48 min	
Black Cake	Historical drama	November 1, 2023	December 6, 2023	1 season, 8 episodes	54–61 min	
A Murder at the End of the World	Murder mystery	November 14, 2023	December 19, 2023	7 episodes	42–72 min	
Echo	Superhero action	January 9, 2024		5 episodes	36–50 min	
Death and Other Details	Murder mystery	January 16, 2024	March 5, 2024	1 season, 10 episodes	40–52 min	
We Were the Lucky Ones	Historical drama	March 28, 2024	May 2, 2024	8 episodes	50–56 min	
Under the Bridge	True crime drama	April 17, 2024	May 29, 2024	8 episodes	35–47 min	
The Veil	Spy thriller	April 30, 2024	May 28, 2024	6 episodes	38–46 min	
Clipped	Drama	June 4, 2024	July 2, 2024	6 episodes	44–58 min	
Say Nothing	Historical political drama	November 14, 2024		9 episodes	40–49 min	
Interior Chinatown	Crime drama	November 19, 2024		10 episodes	35–47 min	
Washington Black	Historical drama	July 23, 2025		8 episodes	32–57 min	
The Twisted Tale of Amanda Knox	True crime drama	August 20, 2025	October 1, 2025	8 episodes	48–55 min	
Murdaugh: Death in the Family	True crime drama	October 15, 2025	November 19, 2025	8 episodes	50–63 min	
The Beauty	Science fiction body horror	January 21, 2026	March 4, 2026	1 season, 11 episodes	24–51 min	

== Comedy ==
Title	Genre	Premiere	Finale	Seasons	Length	Notes
Battleground	Mockumentary	February 14, 2012	May 8, 2012	1 season, 13 episodes	19–22 min	
Quick Draw	Western	August 5, 2013	October 2, 2014	2 seasons, 18 episodes	22–23 min	
Deadbeat	Supernatural sitcom	April 9, 2014	April 20, 2016	3 seasons, 36 episodes	21–23 min	
The Hotwives	Parody	July 15, 2014	September 22, 2015	2 seasons, 14 episodes	22–23 min	
Difficult People	Dark comedy	August 5, 2015	September 26, 2017	3 seasons, 28 episodes	22–29 min	
Casual	Comedy	October 7, 2015	July 31, 2018	4 seasons, 44 episodes	23–24 min	
Future Man	Science fiction	November 14, 2017	April 3, 2020	3 seasons, 34 episodes	27–35 min	
All Night	Teen comedy	May 11, 2018		1 season, 10 episodes	22–24 min	
PEN15	Cringe comedy	February 8, 2019	December 3, 2021	2 seasons, 25 episodes	22–24 min	
Shrill	Comedy	March 15, 2019	May 7, 2021	3 seasons, 22 episodes	21–29 min	
Ramy	Comedy drama	April 19, 2019	September 30, 2022	3 seasons, 30 episodes	23–34 min	
Four Weddings and a Funeral	Romantic comedy	July 31, 2019	September 11, 2019	10 episodes	44–50 min	
Dollface	Comedy	November 15, 2019	February 11, 2022	2 seasons, 20 episodes	22–32 min	
High Fidelity	Comedy drama	February 14, 2020		1 season, 10 episodes	26–34 min	
The Great	Historical comedy	May 15, 2020	May 12, 2023	3 seasons, 30 episodes	48–57 min	
Woke	Comedy	September 9, 2020	April 8, 2022	2 seasons, 16 episodes	25–34 min	
Everyone Is Doing Great	Comedy drama	January 13, 2021		1 season, 8 episodes	25–38 min	(Note: Moved to Netflix)
Reservation Dogs	Teen comedy drama	August 9, 2021	September 27, 2023	3 seasons, 28 episodes	24–34 min	
How I Met Your Father	Sitcom	January 18, 2022	July 11, 2023	2 seasons, 30 episodes	22–25 min	
Life & Beth	Comedy drama	March 18, 2022	February 16, 2024	2 seasons, 20 episodes	24–32 min	
The Bear	Comedy drama	June 23, 2022	June 25, 2026	5 seasons, 46 episodes	20–66 min	
Maggie	Comedy	July 6, 2022		1 season, 13 episodes	22–24 min	
This Fool	Comedy	August 12, 2022	July 28, 2023	2 seasons, 20 episodes	22–31 min	
Reboot	Sitcom	September 20, 2022	October 25, 2022	1 season, 8 episodes	22–33 min	
History of the World, Part II	Sketch comedy	March 6, 2023	March 9, 2023	8 episodes	21–30 min	
Unprisoned	Comedy drama	March 10, 2023	July 17, 2024	2 seasons, 16 episodes	25–31 min	
Up Here	Musical romantic comedy	March 24, 2023		1 season, 8 episodes	24–31 min	
The Other Black Girl	Dark comedy psychological thriller	September 13, 2023		1 season, 10 episodes	25–32 min	
Goosebumps	Horror comedy anthology	October 13, 2023	January 10, 2025	2 seasons, 18 episodes	37–48 min	
How to Die Alone	Comedy	September 13, 2024	September 27, 2024	1 season, 8 episodes	27–35 min	
Deli Boys	Crime comedy	March 6, 2025	May 28, 2026	2 seasons, 16 episodes	21–27 min	
Mid-Century Modern	Sitcom	March 28, 2025		1 season, 10 episodes	21–25 min	
Dying for Sex	Comedy drama	April 4, 2025		8 episodes	27–35 min	
Malcolm in the Middle: Life's Still Unfair	Sitcom	April 10, 2026		4 episodes	25–34 min	
Not Suitable for Work	Sitcom	June 2, 2026	June 23, 2026	1 season, 9 episodes	31–47 min	

== Animation ==
=== Adult animation ===
Title	Genre	Premiere	Finale	Seasons	Length	Notes
The Awesomes	Superhero comedy	August 1, 2013	November 3, 2015	3 seasons, 30 episodes	21–23 min	
Mother Up!	Animated sitcom	November 6, 2013	February 26, 2014	1 season, 13 episodes	21–22 min	
Solar Opposites	Science fiction sitcom	May 8, 2020	October 13, 2025	6 seasons, 63 episodes	21–25 min	
Crossing Swords	Medieval fantasy comedy	June 12, 2020	December 10, 2021	2 seasons, 20 episodes	22–24 min	
M.O.D.O.K.	Superhero comedy	May 21, 2021		1 season, 10 episodes	23–25 min	
Hit-Monkey	Superhero	November 17, 2021	July 17, 2024	2 seasons, 20 episodes	22–27 min	
Koala Man	Superhero comedy	January 9, 2023		1 season, 8 episodes	23–24 min	

=== Kids & family ===
Title	Genre	Premiere	Finale	Seasons	Length	Notes
The Doozers	Adventure	April 25, 2014	May 25, 2018	2 seasons, 62 episodes	12–22 min	
The Bravest Knight	Family fantasy	June 21, 2019	June 20, 2025	2 seasons, 26 episodes	12 min	
Animaniacs	Comedy	November 20, 2020	February 17, 2023	3 seasons, 36 episodes	24–27 min	

== Unscripted ==
=== Docuseries ===
Title	Subject	Premiere	Finale	Seasons	Length	Notes
A Day in the Life	Biography	September 29, 2011	January 11, 2013	2 seasons, 16 episodes	20–27 min	
Up to Speed	Travel comedy	August 9, 2012	September 13, 2012	1 season, 6 episodes	24–26 min	
Behind the Mask	Sports	October 29, 2013	February 25, 2015	2 seasons, 20 episodes	22–23 min	
RocketJump: The Show	Making-of	December 2, 2015	January 13, 2016	1 season, 8 episodes	21–27 min	
Triumph	Political comedy	February 8, 2016	November 19, 2016	6 episodes	30–85 min	
Vice Investigates	Investigative journalism	November 1, 2019	April 3, 2020	1 season, 8 episodes	47–59 min	
Defining Moments with OZY	Celebrity	March 4, 2020	November 21, 2020	1 season, 7 episodes	26–33 min	
Hillary	Biography	March 6, 2020		4 episodes	62–65 min	
Taste the Nation with Padma Lakshmi	Travel	June 18, 2020	May 5, 2023	2 seasons, 24 episodes	27–41 min	
Sasquatch	True crime	April 20, 2021		3 episodes	41–51 min	
McCartney 3,2,1	Music	July 16, 2021		6 episodes	27–31 min	
Wild Crime	True crime	September 28, 2021	December 5, 2024	4 seasons, 16 episodes	39–41 min	
The Next Thing You Eat	Food	October 21, 2021		1 season, 6 episodes	29–36 min	
The Curse of Von Dutch: A Brand to Die For	Fashion industry	November 18, 2021		3 episodes	57–58 min	
City of Angels | City of Death	True crime	November 24, 2021		1 season, 6 episodes	40–46 min	
Have You Seen This Man?	True crime	March 24, 2022		3 episodes	37–41 min	
Captive Audience: A Real American Horror Story	True crime	April 21, 2022		3 episodes	42–49 min	
Keeper of the Ashes: The Oklahoma Girl Scout Murders	True crime	May 24, 2022		4 episodes	40–45 min	
Mormon No More	LGBTQ rights	June 24, 2022		4 episodes	49–51 min	
Victoria's Secret: Angels and Demons	Investigative journalism	July 14, 2022		3 episodes	55–58 min	
Legacy: The True Story of the LA Lakers	Sports	August 15, 2022	October 10, 2022	10 episodes	47–66 min	
The Murders Before the Marathon	True crime	September 5, 2022		3 episodes	42–47 min	
Where Is Private Dulaney?	True crime	November 16, 2022		3 episodes	46–52 min	
Grails: When Sneakers Change the Game	Business	December 14, 2022		6 episodes	22–28 min	
Death in the Dorms	True crime	January 5, 2023	February 22, 2024	2 seasons, 6 episodes	55–56 min	
How I Caught My Killer	True crime	January 12, 2023	July 18, 2024	2 seasons, 19 episodes	42–50 min	
Web of Death	True crime	January 19, 2023		6 episodes	45–60 min	
The 1619 Project	History	January 26, 2023	February 9, 2023	6 episodes	55–61 min	
Killing County	True crime	February 3, 2023		3 episodes	46–47 min	
Stolen Youth: Inside the Cult at Sarah Lawrence	True crime	February 9, 2023		3 episodes	63–74 min	
Still Missing Morgan	True crime	February 16, 2023		4 episodes	50–59 min	
The Lesson Is Murder	True crime	March 23, 2023		3 episodes	53–54 min	
RapCaviar Presents	Music	March 30, 2023		6 episodes	41–43 min	
Pretty Baby: Brooke Shields	Biography	April 3, 2023		2 episodes	68–70 min	
Algiers, America	Sports	April 19, 2023		5 episodes	53–59 min	
Searching for Soul Food	Travel/Food	June 2, 2023		8 episodes	22–27 min	
The Age of Influence	Social media/True crime	June 5, 2023		6 episodes	49–65 min	
The Ashley Madison Affair	True crime	July 7, 2023		3 episodes	42–43 min	
Mother Undercover	True crime	July 27, 2023		4 episodes	47–56 min	
Demons & Saviors	True crime	August 3, 2023		3 episodes	41–47 min	
The Conversations Project	African-American culture	August 28, 2023		1 season, 6 episodes	30–33 min	
Never Let Him Go	True crime	September 6, 2023		4 episodes	51–60 min	
Drive with Swizz Beatz	Cars	November 16, 2023		6 episodes	32–36 min	
The Secret Life of Dancing Dogs	Dog show	November 17, 2023		6 episodes	27–42 min	
Daughters of the Cult	True crime	January 4, 2024		5 episodes	42–49 min	
Superhot: The Spicy World of Pepper People	Food	January 22, 2024		10 episodes	31–38 min	
Me Hereafter	True crime	February 29, 2024		4 episodes	53–58 min	
Thank You, Goodnight: The Bon Jovi Story	Music	April 26, 2024		4 episodes	60–94 min	
Black Twitter: A People's History	Social media/African-American culture	May 9, 2024		3 episodes	46–50 min	
The Beauty Queen Killer: 9 Days of Terror	True crime	May 16, 2024		3 episodes	40–49 min	
Cult Massacre: One Day in Jonestown	True crime	June 17, 2024		3 episodes	45 min	
Perfect Wife: The Mysterious Disappearance of Sherri Papini	True crime	June 20, 2024		3 episodes	52–61 min	
Mastermind: To Think Like a Killer	True crime	July 11, 2024		3 episodes	40–44 min	
At Witt's End: The Hunt for a Killer	True crime	August 6, 2024		4 episodes	42–50 min	
After Baywatch: Moment in the Sun	Television	August 28, 2024		4 episodes	46–50 min	
Little Miss Innocent: Passion. Poison. Prison.	True crime	September 20, 2024		3 episodes	42 min	
Out There: Crimes of the Paranormal	Paranormal/True crime	September 24, 2024		1 season, 8 episodes	39–51 min	
It's All Country	Music	November 15, 2024		1 season, 6 episodes	40–42 min	
Vow of Silence: The Assassination of Annie Mae	True crime	November 26, 2024		4 episodes	51–53 min	
Wicked Game: Devil in the Desert	True crime	February 4, 2025		3 episodes	35–45 min	
The Fox Hollow Murders: Playground of a Serial Killer	True crime	February 18, 2025	July 8, 2026	2 seasons, 5 episodes	48–66 min	
Devil in the Family: The Fall of Ruby Franke	True crime	February 27, 2025		3 episodes	50 min	
Murder Has Two Faces	True crime	May 6, 2025		3 episodes	42 min	
Hey Beautiful: Anatomy of a Romance Scam	True crime	May 20, 2025		3 episodes	46–48 min	
Diddy on Trial: As It Happened	True crime	May 25, 2025	June 29, 2025	6 episodes	28–39 min	
Call Her Alex	Media	June 10, 2025		2 episodes	57–59 min	
Her Last Broadcast: The Abduction of Jodi Huisentruit	True crime	July 15, 2025		3 episodes	42 min	
Trophy Wife: Murder on Safari	True crime	July 21, 2025		3 episodes	40–43 min	
Mr. & Mrs. Murder	True crime	July 30, 2025		4 episodes	41–43 min	
Capturing Their Killer: The Girls on the High Bridge	True crime	August 5, 2025		3 episodes	42 min	
Stalking Samantha: 13 Years of Terror	True crime	August 19, 2025		3 episodes	42 min	
Memphis to the Mountain	Mountain climbing	September 5, 2025		3 episodes	47–59 min	
Into the Void: Life, Death and Heavy Metal	Music	September 22, 2025		8 episodes	42 min	
Death in Apartment 603: What Happened to Ellen Greenberg?	True crime	September 29, 2025		3 episodes	43 min	
Caroline Flack: Search for the Truth	Celebrity	November 10, 2025		2 episodes	51–53 min	
The Scream Murder: A True Teen Horror Story	True crime	February 11, 2026		3 episodes	42–45 min	
Girl on the Run: The Hunt for America's Most Wanted Woman	True crime	February 19, 2026		3 episodes	42 min	
Friends Like These: The Murder of Skylar Neese	True crime	March 6, 2026		3 episodes	41–56 min	
The Cult of NatureBoy	Cults/True crime	April 28, 2026 (Note: United States and Caribbean); July 15, 2026 (Note: Europe, Middle East, and Africa)		4 episodes	40–42 min	
The Nightmare Upstairs: What Happened to Ty and Bryn?	True crime	May 19, 2026		2 episodes	38–43 min	
Welcome to the Family: The Murder of Dan Markel	True crime	September 1, 2026		4 episodes	41–43 min	
Swipe Right on the Devil	True crime	October 22, 2026		3 episodes	59–62 min	
Get Huge: Looksmaxxing to Death	Looksmaxxing/True crime	November 10, 2026		3 episodes	61–66 min	

=== Reality ===
Title	Genre	Premiere	Finale	Seasons	Length	Notes
Eater's Guide to the World	Food docu-reality	November 11, 2020		1 season, 7 episodes	24–31 min	
The D'Amelio Show	Docu-soap	September 3, 2021	October 18, 2023	3 seasons, 28 episodes	23–47 min	
Baker's Dozen	Cooking competition	October 7, 2021		1 season, 8 episodes	47–51 min	
Candified: Home for the Holidays	Cooking competition	December 1, 2021		1 season, 4 episodes	42 min	
Power Trip – Those Who Seek Power and Those Who Chase Them	Docu-reality	September 25, 2022	November 13, 2022	1 season, 8 episodes	29–34 min	
Best in Dough	Baking competition	September 19, 2022	October 3, 2022	1 season, 10 episodes	33–34 min	
Chefs vs. Wild	Cooking competition	September 26, 2022	October 17, 2022	1 season, 8 episodes	39–41 min	
Back in the Groove	Dating competition	December 5, 2022	December 8, 2022	1 season, 8 episodes	45–57 min	
Drag Me to Dinner	Cooking competition	May 31, 2023		1 season, 10 episodes	35–43 min	
Secrets & Sisterhood: The Sozahdahs	Docu-reality	June 7, 2023		1 season, 10 episodes	36–44 min	
Secret Chef	Cooking competition	June 29, 2023		1 season, 10 episodes	40–46 min	
Love in Fairhope	Dating show	September 27, 2023		1 season, 9 episodes	20–30 min	
Living for the Dead	Reality	October 18, 2023		1 season, 8 episodes	45–49 min	
Love & WWE: Bianca & Montez	Sports docu-soap	February 2, 2024		1 season, 8 episodes	26–29 min	
High Hopes	Docu-reality	April 20, 2024		1 season, 6 episodes	29–38 min	
Dress My Tour	Fashion competition	July 23, 2024		1 season, 10 episodes	42–49 min	
Muslim Matchmaker	Reality	February 11, 2025		1 season, 8 episodes	30–37 min	
Got to Get Out	Survival competition	April 11, 2025		1 season, 8 episodes	43–44 min	
Are You My First?	Dating show	August 18, 2025		1 season, 10 episodes	41–65 min	
Love Overboard	Dating show	March 26, 2026		1 season, 9 episodes	43–48 min	

=== Variety ===
Title	Genre	Premiere	Finale	Seasons	Length	Notes
Spoilers with Kevin Smith	Film criticism talk show	June 4, 2012	February 21, 2014	1 season, 10 episodes	20–26 min	
I Love You, America with Sarah Silverman	Politics talk show	October 12, 2017	November 15, 2018	1 season, 21 episodes	26–33 min	

== Non-English language ==
=== German ===
Title	Genre	Premiere	Finale	Seasons	Runtime	Exclusive region(s)	Notes
City of Blood	Supernatural dystopian drama	September 16, 2026		8 episodes	42–57 min	Selected territories	
Vienna Game	Period dark comedy	November 18, 2026		6 episodes	47–56 min	Selected territories	

=== Korean ===
Title	Genre	Premiere	Finale	Seasons	Runtime	Exclusive region(s)	Notes
The Murky Stream	Historical drama	October 10, 2025	October 17, 2025	9 episodes	47–60 min	All markets	(Note: These shows premiered on Star (Disney+), but continued to air on Hulu as Hulu Originals after the content hub was rebranded. The premiere reflects the date of their first episode as Hulu Originals.)
The Manipulated	Crime revenge drama	November 5, 2025	December 3, 2025	12 episodes	46–54 min	All markets	
Bloody Flower	Crime thriller	February 4, 2026	February 25, 2026	8 episodes	48–59 min	South Korea	
Gold Land	Crime thriller	April 29, 2026	May 27, 2026	10 episodes	53–68 min	All markets	

=== Spanish ===
Title	Genre	Premiere	Finale	Seasons	Runtime	Exclusive region(s)	Notes
La Máquina	Sports drama	October 9, 2024		6 episodes	29–53 min	Selected territories	
Fate	Comedy	October 8, 2025		6 episodes	28–35 min	Selected territories	
Entrepreneurs	Comedy	October 23, 2025		10 episodes	26–32 min	Selected territories	
Daughter of Fire	Crime drama	November 19, 2025		1 season, 22 episodes	28−42 min	Latin America and United States	
If It's Tuesday, It's Murder	Mystery comedy drama miniseries	March 31, 2026		7 episodes	39–48 min	Selected territories	
Dear Killer Nannies	Coming-of-age crime drama	April 1, 2026		8 episodes	31–37 min	Selected territories	
Abandoned	True crime	May 29, 2026 (Note: Spain); July 1, 2026 (Note: All other territories)		4 episodes	35–43 min	Selected territories	
Unexpected Loves	Romantic comedy anthology	September 16, 2026		6 episodes	34–45 min	Selected territories	

=== Turkish ===
Title	Genre	Premiere	Finale	Seasons	Runtime	Exclusive region(s)	Notes
The Eighth Family	Comedy drama	November 19, 2025	December 24, 2025	8 episodes	37–45 min	Selected territories	
We'll Be Fine	Romantic drama	March 25, 2026; April 23, 2026 (Note: United States); June 3, 2026 (Note: Brazil and Latin America)	April 22, 2026	8 episodes	44–62 min	Selected territories	

=== Other ===
Title	Genre	Premiere	Finale	Seasons	Runtime	Language	Exclusive region(s)	Notes
The Lost Station Girls	True crime drama	October 8, 2025		6 episodes	42–50 min	French	Selected territories	
To Cook a Bear	Historical crime drama	October 15, 2025		6 episodes	50–52 min	Swedish	Selected territories	

== Co-productions ==
These shows have been commissioned by Hulu in cooperation with a partner network.

Title	Genre	Partner/Country	Premiere	Finale	Seasons	Length	Notes
The Wrong Mans	Comedy drama	BBC Two/United Kingdom	November 11, 2013	December 24, 2014	2 seasons, 10 episodes	29–31 min	
Harlots	Historical period drama	ITV Encore/United Kingdom	March 29, 2017	August 28, 2019	3 seasons, 24 episodes	44–50 min	
Hard Sun	Drama	BBC One/United Kingdom	March 7, 2018		1 season, 6 episodes	54–56 min	
The First	Drama	Channel 4/United Kingdom	September 14, 2018		1 season, 8 episodes	45–48 min	
The Bisexual	Comedy drama	Channel 4/United Kingdom	November 16, 2018		1 season, 6 episodes	27–30 min	
Holly Hobbie	Teen comedy	Family Channel/Canada	November 16, 2018	November 23, 2021	3 seasons, 30 episodes	25 min	(Note: These shows were cancelled by Hulu, but were picked up by another channel or streaming service for additional seasons.)
Catch-22	Satire dark comedy	Sky Italia/Italy	May 17, 2019		6 episodes	40–46 min	
This Way Up	Comedy drama	Channel 4/United Kingdom	August 21, 2019	July 9, 2021	2 seasons, 12 episodes	23–25 min	
The Accident	Drama	Channel 4/United Kingdom	November 22, 2019		4 episodes	47 min	
Endlings	Family science fiction	CBC Television/Canada	January 17, 2020	January 15, 2021	2 seasons, 24 episodes	22 min	
Utopia Falls	Teen science fiction drama	CBC Gem/Canada	February 14, 2020		1 season, 10 episodes	44 min	
Normal People	Drama	BBC Three/United Kingdom	April 29, 2020		12 episodes	21–33 min	
Madagascar: A Little Wild	Animated family comedy	Peacock/United States	September 7, 2020	June 30, 2022	8 seasons, 50 episodes	23 min	
The Mighty Ones	Animated family comedy	Peacock/United States	November 9, 2020	December 9, 2022	4 seasons, 40 episodes	23 min	
No Man's Land	Drama	Arte France/France	November 18, 2020	April 16, 2025	2 seasons, 16 episodes	42–52 min	
Trolls: TrollsTopia	Animated family comedy	Peacock/United States	November 19, 2020	August 11, 2022	7 seasons, 52 episodes	23 min	
The Hardy Boys	Mystery teen drama	YTV/Canada	December 4, 2020	July 26, 2023	3 seasons, 31 episodes	40–46 min	
The Sister	Psychological thriller	ITV/United Kingdom	January 22, 2021		4 episodes	45–46 min	
The Croods: Family Tree	Animated family comedy	Peacock/United States	September 23, 2021	November 9, 2023	8 seasons, 52 episodes	22 min	
Dragons: The Nine Realms	Animated adventure	Peacock/United States	December 23, 2021	December 14, 2023	8 seasons, 52 episodes	23 min	
Conversations with Friends	Drama	BBC Three/United Kingdom	May 15, 2022		12 episodes	25–31 min	
Abominable and the Invisible City	Animated adventure	Peacock/United States	October 5, 2022	March 29, 2023	2 seasons, 20 episodes	23 min	
The Hair Tales	Beauty/Culture docuseries	OWN/United States	October 22, 2022	November 5, 2022	1 season, 6 episodes	41 min	
Planet Sex with Cara Delevingne	Docuseries	BBC Three/United Kingdom	February 14, 2023		1 season, 6 episodes	41–45 min	
Great Expectations	Period drama	BBC/United Kingdom	March 26, 2023	April 20, 2023	6 episodes	56–58 min	
The Full Monty	Comedy drama	Disney+ (Star Hub)/United Kingdom	June 14, 2023		8 episodes	38–54 min	
Spellbound	Fantasy teen drama	France Television/France; ZDF/Germany	August 31, 2023	October 11, 2024	2 seasons, 39 episodes	23–24 min	
Fright Krewe	Animated horror	Peacock/United States	October 2, 2023	March 29, 2024	2 seasons, 20 episodes	21–22 min	
Davey & Jonesie's Locker	Teen comedy	Amazon Prime Video/Australia, Canada, and New Zealand	March 22, 2024		1 season, 10 episodes	25–33 min	
Queenie	Drama	Channel 4/United Kingdom	June 7, 2024		1 season, 8 episodes	25–26 min	
The Kollective	Political thriller	France Télévisions/France; RAI/Italy; ZDF/Germany	June 10, 2025		1 season, 6 episodes	60 min	

== Continuations ==
These shows have been either picked up by Hulu for additional seasons after having aired previous seasons on another network, or were moved to Hulu from another network and premiered on the service without being marketed as Hulu Originals.

Title	Genre	Prev. network(s)	Premiere	Finale	Seasons	Length	Notes
The Mindy Project (seasons 4–6)	Comedy	Fox	September 9, 2015	November 14, 2017	3 seasons, 50 episodes	22–31 min	
UnREAL (season 4)	Drama	Lifetime	July 16, 2018		1 season, 8 episodes	42 min	
Veronica Mars (season 4)	Noir/mystery	UPN/The CW	July 19, 2019		1 season, 8 episodes	48–53 min	
The Orville (season 3)	Science fiction comedy drama	Fox	June 2, 2022	August 4, 2022	1 season, 10 episodes	60–88 min	
Duncanville (season 3B)	Animated sitcom	Fox	October 18, 2022		1 season, 6 episodes	22 min	

== Specials ==
These programs are supplementary content related to original TV shows.

Title	Genre	Premiere	Length	Notes
Madagascar: A Little Wild – A Fang-Tastic Halloween	Animated family comedy	October 21, 2020	23 min	(Note: Co-production with Peacock)
Madagascar: A Little Wild – Holiday Goose Chase	Animated family comedy	November 26, 2021	23 min	
'Til Death Do Us Part Kourtney & Travis	Reality	April 13, 2023	1 h 12 min	
The Bear: Gary	Comedy drama	May 5, 2026	59 min	

=== Exclusive specials ===
These television specials premiered exclusively on the service without the Hulu Original label. Availability may vary across regions.

Title	Genre	Premiere	Runtime	Notes
Family Guy: Peter, Peter, Pumpkin Cheater	Adult animation	October 14, 2024	22 min	
Family Guy: Gift of the White Guy	Adult animation	November 25, 2024	22 min	
Family Guy: A Little Fright Music	Adult animation	October 6, 2025	22 min	
Family Guy: Disney's Hulu's Family Guy's Hallmark Channel's Lifetime's Familiar Holiday Movie	Adult animation	November 28, 2025	22 min	
