= Hey Beautiful =

Hey Beautiful may refer to:

- "Hey Beautiful" (How I Met Your Mother song), a theme song for the 2015 television series
- Hey Beautiful (2023 documentary), directed by Lillian Glass
- "Hey Beautiful" (Joe Jonas song), 2025
- Hey Beautiful: Anatomy of a Romance Scam, a 2025 docuseries originally on Hulu

== See also ==
- Hi, Beautiful, a 1944 American film
