= Chad Harris-Crane =

Soap opera character

- Passions character
- Charles Divins as Chad Harris-Crane
- Portrayed by: Donn Swaby (1999–2002); Charles Divins (2002–07)
- Duration: 1999–2007
- First appearance: September 23, 1999
- Last appearance: August 28, 2007
- Created by: James E. Reilly
In-universe information
- Other names: Chad Harris
- Occupation: Businessman for Crane Industries (formerly); Gofer for Book Café (formerly); Coaching assistant for T. C. Russell (formerly); Music producer (formerly); High school student (formerly; dropped out)
- Family: Crane
- Father: Alistair Crane
- Mother: Liz Sanbourne
- Half-brothers: Julian Crane
- Half-sisters: Sheridan Crane; Beth Wallace
- Spouse: LaToya Harris (until 2003); Whitney Russell (2006–07)
- Children: Miles Harris-Crane; Diana Harris-Crane
- Grandmothers: Ruby Lincoln (adoptive)
- Aunts: Eve Russell (adoptive)
- Nieces and nephews: Vincent Clarkson; Fancy Crane; Fox Crane (deceased); Pretty Crane; James Boothe (adoptive); Endora Lenox; Marty Lopez-Fitzgerald; Unnamed nephew
- First cousins: Vincent Clarkson (adoptive); Whitney Russell (adoptive); Simone Russell (adoptive)

Chad Harris-Crane is a fictional character on the American soap opera Passions, which aired on NBC from 1999 to 2007 and on DirecTV in 2007–08. Developed by the soap's creator and head writer James E. Reilly, Chad was portrayed by two actors over the course of the show: Donn Swaby (1999 to 2002) and Charles Divins (2002 to 2007). Swaby left the show to pursue roles outside daytime television and was replaced by Divins. The role was the first time that either actor had worked on a television series.

Chad is a member of the Crane family. The illegitimate son of the evil patriarch Alistair Crane, Chad is introduced as a music producer from Los Angeles who is searching for his biological family. Chad becomes involved in a love triangle with sisters Whitney and Simone Russell. His romance with Whitney is complicated by the possibility they may be engaging in an incestuous relationship as Chad is initially believed to be her half-brother, and later revealed to be her adoptive cousin. Chad's later storylines focus on his confusion over his sexual identity, and his sexual relationship with tabloid reporter Vincent Clarkson. Chad attempts to reconcile with Whitney, after his affair with Vincent is revealed, before being killed by his father Alistair while trying to protect his best friend, Ethan Winthrop.

Critical response to Chad was mixed; some reviewers praised the sensationalism of the incest storyline with Whitney, while others criticized his relationship with Vincent as an irresponsible and problematic representation of racial and sexual identity. The character marks a notable step in daytime television and soap opera history; it was the first depiction in a soap opera of two men having sex. Chad has also been cited as expanding the representation of LGBTQ characters of color on daytime television. Divins discussed the storyline with his gay friends and researched LGBT culture to better shape his performance. Media outlets expressed varying opinions of the exact nature of Chad's sexual orientation.

== Development ==
=== Creation and casting ===
Sheraton Kalouria, senior vice president of NBC's daytime programming, described the show's use of color-blind casting as part of an effort to build a diverse pool of characters that best reflected the various ethnic and racial groups living in the United States. Kalouria believed the show was set apart from other soap operas by the inclusion of "the African American Russells and the Hispanic Lopez-Fitzgeralds".

The role was played by two actors over the course of the show: Donn Swaby (1999 to 2002) and Charles Divins (2002 to 2007). Passions was Swaby's first role in a television series. On May 27, 2002, Swaby announced on his official website that he had decided to leave the show to pursue other opportunities outside of daytime television. Divins assumed the role on September 12, 2002. It was his first audition and acting experience; he had previously worked full-time as a fashion model and had decided to pursue an acting career after appearing in commercials. Divins initially auditioned for another soap opera, but its producers suggested that he instead take a role on Passions. He described his time working on the show as a "scholarship to acting".

=== Characterization and cast response ===
Chad was initially characterized as a "street-kid" by the show's official website and "a tough dude from the hood" by David Alexander Nahmod of the Bay Area Reporter. Swaby called his character "talented, ambitious, adventurous, passionate", and said that his guarded personality was a way of "defying the good guy, bad guy stereotype". Chad originally served as the "object of affection for both Simone and Whitney", but his role on the series was expanded following the casting of Divins. An article on Soaps.com wrote that Divins adapted the character from being a "West Coast music producer to [an] ambitious and tortured Crane heir". Over the course of the show, Chad was defined by his relationships with his supposed half-sister Whitney and his nephew-niece, Vincent Clarkson. After Swaby left the show, he was disappointed by the direction Chad's storyline took.

Despite the controversy and negative reception of Chad's sexual encounters with Vincent, Divins identified Chad's confusion over his sexual orientation as a vital part of the storyline. (Note: "Out in Hollywood" is affiliated with the Los Angeles Daily News.) While the show was still filming, he expressed an interest in further exploring Chad's rejection of his sexuality. Divins felt that the key element of the storyline was Chad's difficulty in coming to terms with his sexuality. When asked by an interviewer about the revelation of Chad's sexuality, Divins said the show would include clear representations of "male intimacy". Divins said he was uncomfortable shooting scenes related to the storyline, but felt it was an opportunity to sharpen his skills as an actor. He added that he wanted to make the character as "grounded and real as possible" and keep the focus on how Chad reconciles with his sexual orientation.

To prepare for the storyline, Divins consulted with his gay friends and asked them how to ensure the character was "being represented correctly and honestly". Oprah Winfrey's discussion of the down-low on her talk show The Oprah Winfrey Show also helped Divins better understand the character. Divins was unaware of the developments in Chad's sexuality until he was given the script four days prior to the filming of the episodes. He said he was surprised by the reveal that Chad's affair was with a man, but thought the soap opera's "storytelling style lends itself to dramatic changes". Divins praised the show for its inclusion of a black, gay character on daytime television regardless of any negative feedback from fans who preferred Chad and Whitney as a couple, and said that he wasn't afraid to take on the role, given the increased visibility of LGBT issues on television and in everyday society at the time of the storyline's broadcast. Chad's character and storyline were not to every cast member's taste; Tracey Ross, who played Eve Russell, later said she "was never crazy about" the incest plot, though Phillip Jeanmarie, who played Vincent Clarkson, commented that he was glad to have been part of the taboo-breaking story.

== Storylines ==
Chad Harris-Crane first appears in the episode airing on September 23, 1999, in which, after discovering he was adopted, he moves from Los Angeles to Harmony to find his real parents. Chad married Latoya Harris while he was working as a music producer in Los Angeles. Latoya refused to accompany Chad to Harmony as she did not want to leave her friends and family. While in Harmony, Chad encounters two people with information on his past – Orville Perkins and Crystal Harris. Orville, a senile old man, erroneously believes Chad is Eve's long-lost son with Crane Industries CEO Julian Crane and claims to have evidence proving this connection. In a desperate attempt to keep her past hidden, Eve burns down Orville's house and any evidence inside and places him in a retirement home. Chad later meets jazz singer Crystal Harris, who was Eve's confidante during her relationship with Julian and subsequent pregnancy. Crystal also offers information about Chad's birth and parents, but is killed by a French drug cartel's assassin Antoine, who mistakes her for socialite Sheridan Crane, before she can deliver it to him.

During this time, Chad meets and falls in love with Whitney Russell. Their relationship is complicated by her sister Simone Russell's crush on him, and her parents' disapproval of him. Eve discourages both of her children from pursuing a relationship with Chad, fearing he will be a bad influence on her daughter in the same way Julian was on her teenage self. Whitney and Chad keep their romantic and sexual encounters secret for years while he pretends to be in love with Simone. The love triangle continues until Simone catches Whitney kissing Chad. Simone breaks up publicly with Chad and tells everyone in Harmony about his relationship with Whitney. During 2003, Chad's connection to Whitney steadily unravels after the discovery of his marriage to Latoya and her attempt to murder Whitney.

In 2004, Eve's vengeful adoptive sister Liz Sanbourne arranges for Eve's past relationship with Julian to be exposed to the Russell family and the rest of Harmony, resulting in Chad being erroneously identified as their son. From this point on, the apparently incestuous relationship between Chad and Whitney becomes one of the primary storylines on Passions. Whitney discovers that she is pregnant with Chad's child. She initiates a relationship with Fox Crane to be able to insinuate that he is the father and protect herself, and her child, from the stigma of incest. She gives birth to a son and immediately uses her then-boyfriend Fox Crane's power of attorney to put him up for adoption. Two couples—Julian and Eve, and T.C. and Liz—compete to adopt the boy, but Chad is awarded custody of the child. He attempts to use the child to reconnect with Whitney. Whitney and Chad name their baby Miles Davis Harris after jazz musician Miles Davis. During the show's 2005 summertime extravaganza, Whitney has sex with Chad in the middle of a tsunami and admits to Chad that he is Miles' biological father. Identified as the Vendetta plot, the show's 2006 summertime extravaganza centers on Alistair Crane luring Whitney, Chad, and several other residents of Harmony, to Rome. While in Rome, Chad is given his birth certificate by tabloid editor J. T. Cornell and discovers that he was conceived during Alistair's rape of Liz. Following the revelation of his true paternity, Chad marries Whitney and they decide to raise their son together, and rename him Miles Harris-Crane.

Unbeknownst to Whitney, Chad previously began a sexual relationship with the tabloid reporter Vincent Clarkson at an unspecified time around the Vendetta plot, and he continues the affair after their reunion and wedding. Chad is unaware that Vincent is Eve's actual child with Julian; thus, although his relationship with Whitney was not incestuous, he ironically committed incest with his half-brother's son. He is also initially oblivious to the fact that Vincent is intersex, and is the same person as Valerie Davis, the executive assistant to Crane Industries' vice president Theresa Lopez-Fitzgerald. While confessing his affair to his friends Paloma Lopez-Fitzgerald and Noah Bennett, Chad repeatedly insists that he is not gay, and that his relationship with Vincent is based solely on sex. Whitney becomes increasingly suspicious of Chad's fidelity after discovering she is pregnant with their second child. Furious with Chad for continuing to sleep with Whitney, Vincent engineers a scenario in which Whitney sees Vincent and Chad having sex in the back of a gay bar; Whitney leaves Chad immediately and he distances himself from Vincent. The estranged couple start to reconcile as they try to help Theresa and Ethan Winthrop reunite, but that possibility is cut short on August 28, 2007, when Chad is killed by Alistair while trying to protect his best friend Ethan. Chad dies professing his love for Whitney and their children.

== Reception and impact ==
Chad's possibly incestuous relationship led media outlets to sensationalize Harmony as the place where "half-siblings sleep with one another", and the 2006 revelation that Whitney and Chad were not related by blood was listed as one of Passions' most shocking secrets by an article in Soap Opera Digest. Soapdom.com asserted that the plot enabled Divins to showcase his acting abilities and distinguish himself from his predecessor Swaby.

Media outlets expressed differing opinions over the exact nature of Chad's sexuality. Hartinger called Chad a "closeted bisexual", and the Bay Area Reporter referred to him as a gay black man. An article on NewNowNext.com listed Divins' interpretation of the character as a choice for the "Favorite Gay (Male) TV Character Poll". Soap opera journalist Roger Newcomb of We Love Soaps questioned whether Chad was truly gay, arguing that Vincent's reveal as intersex leads to Chad's heterosexuality being "rescued" as he "was sleeping only with Vincent's female anatomy". Joel McHale from E!'s weekly television series The Soup turned a scene in which Chad insisted he was "not gay" despite his affair with Vincent into a running gag by referring to the character as "Not Gay Chad". During the show's season five premiere, Divins made a cameo appearance on The Soup to explain to McHale that he was not his character and was neither dead nor gay.

Passions made daytime history by being the first to depict two men having sex, but the pairing of Chad and Vincent drew less media attention than the gay relationships in As the World Turns and One Life to Live. The complicated incest storyline was described as "insanely convoluted" by Gawker's Kyle Buchanan, who felt it was one of "the most insane things that have ever happened on television"; the plotline was also praised, by Soaps.com, as reflecting the show's "unique perspective and zest for controversy" while challenging the "often too safe and predictable world of soaps". NewNowNext.com approved of the plotline for increasing the presence of LGBT people of color on daytime television, with Ross von Metze of Edge Media Network commenting that the show was "taking risks where other TV shows have failed".

Viewers were divided over the sexually explicit sequences between Chad and Vincent. Some felt the scenes between Chad and Vincent were "appalling" and inappropriate for daytime television, while one viewer praised the soap opera for "continu[ing] their outstanding jobs as they teach the people of today's world about daily life experiences". A writer from Soaps.com defended the show by pointing out graphic sex scenes between men and women were previously aired without complaint.

Chad's relationship with Vincent received some criticism, with Windy City Times; describing the storyline as "reckless" and "outrageous". According to Slate's Ta-Nehisi Coates, the storyline was also disliked by the show's black audience. Mike Perigard of the Boston Herald was critical of the timing of the death of lesbian Rae Thomas following the reveal of Chad's affair with a man; Perigard argued that Thomas's character was removed to reduce the number of gay characters on the show.

== See also ==
- List of LGBT characters in soap operas
