= Erin Lee Carr =

American documentary filmmaker

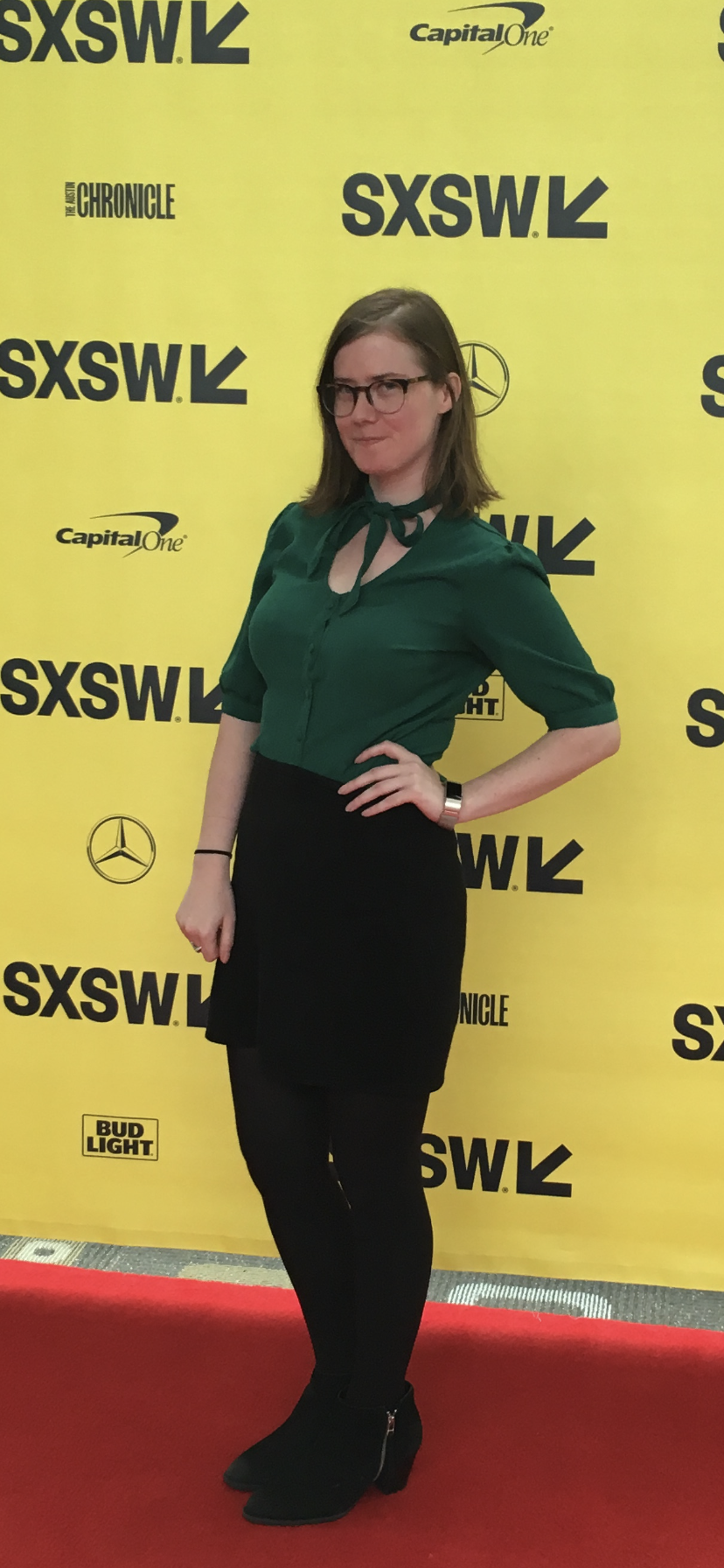
- Erin Lee Carr at SXSW
- Born: April 15, 1988 (age 38); Minneapolis, Minnesota U.S.
- Education: University of Wisconsin–Madison
- Occupations: Documentary filmmaker Writer
- Years active: 2010–present
- Parent: David Carr
- Website: erinleecarr.com

Erin Lee Carr (born April 15, 1988) is an American documentary film director and producer. Her documentaries include Thought Crimes: The Case of the Cannibal Cop (2015), Mommy Dead and Dearest (2017), I Love You, Now Die: The Commonwealth vs. Michelle Carter (2019), At the Heart of Gold: Inside the USA Gymnastics Scandal (2019), as well as the 2021 Netflix documentary Britney vs Spears.

She is also an author for VICE and her memoir called All That You Leave Behind: A Memoir.

== Early life and education ==
Carr was born in Minneapolis, Minnesota to The New York Times media columnist David Carr and Anna Lee.

Carr and her twin sister, Meagan Carr, were born two and a half months early. Their parents lost custody of the twins because of their drug addiction. Carr and her sister went into foster care for a summer. When their father got out of rehab, he regained physical custody of the girls and in 1994 married Jill Rooney, who became Carr's step-mother.

In addition to her twin sister Meagan, Carr has a half-sister named Maddie. The family lived in Minneapolis, Minnesota, and then New Jersey.

In 2010, Carr graduated from the University of Wisconsin–Madison with a Bachelor of Arts in Communication Arts. In the spring of 2010, Carr attended FAMU in Prague in the Czech Republic.

== Career ==
=== 2009–2014 ===
In the summer of 2009, Carr was an intern at Fox Searchlight Pictures, working in the public relations department. In the fall of 2009, Carr worked as a Media Assistant at the Instructional Media Center in the Communication Arts Department at the University of Wisconsin–Madison. In November 2010, she worked as an office production assistant on Lena Dunham's TV show, Girls.

Carr worked as a college intern at VICE. In 2010, she got a full-time job at VICE where she worked up to an Associate Producer position for Vice Media's Motherboard, In 2011, Carr co-produced the documentary Free The Network for Motherboard. The film depicted the efforts of the Free Network Foundation to provide Occupy Wall Street protestors in Zuccotti Park with Internet connectivity.

In 2012, Carr developed Spaced Out for Motherboard. Spaced Out had twelve videos, nine of which Carr helped create. In 2013, Carr developed My Life Online for VICE's Motherboard. Carr also produced a documentary for VICE called Click. Print. Gun. about Cody Wilson, the owner of Defense Distributed. The film shows how 3D-printing is creating new issues with gun production. The documentary won a 2014 Webby Award.

In June 2013, she left VICE for Vox Media's The Verge to produce long and short stories. In November 2013, Carr became a freelance director for HBO Documentary Films.

=== 2015–2021 ===
In 2015, Variety included Carr as one of its "10 Documakers To Watch". Carr's first documentary for HBO, Thought Crimes: The Case of the Cannibal Cop premiered at the 2015 Tribeca Film Festival. The documentary received positive reviews and was a finalist for the 2016 Cinema Eye Honors in the non-fiction film for television category.

In May 2017, Carr's documentary film Mommy Dead and Dearest was released. It was an official selection for SXSW, Hot Docs and DocAviv and was one of the most-watched documentaries on HBO in 2017. In 2018, Carr directed an episode of the Netflix documentary series Dirty Money called "Drug Short" which examines how big pharmaceutical companies exploit patients seeking life saving drugs. Carr made the 2018 Forbes 30 under 30 list.

In 2019, Carr's two-part HBO documentary I Love You, Now Die: The Commonwealth Vs. Michelle Carter premiered at SXSW. It was also an official selection at Hot Docs and the Montclair Film Festival. Carr's film At the Heart of Gold: Inside the USA Gymnastics Scandal, premiered at the 2019 Tribeca Film Festival,

Carr directed the limited series, How to Fix a Drug Scandal, that was released on Netflix on April 1, 2020.

After the February 2021 release and public reaction to Framing Britney Spears, a New York Times presentation on FX, Bloomberg announced that Carr was working on an additional documentary to be streamed on Netflix. Carr directed and produced the documentary Britney vs Spears about the Spears family and Britney Spears's attempts to challenge her 13-year conservatorship by her father Jamie Spears and former business manager Lou M. Taylor.

=== 2022–present ===
In 2023, Carr directed and produced The Ringleader: The Case of the Bling Ring.

In 2024, Carr directed and produced I Am Not a Monster: The Lois Riess Murders.

Carr, along with Lena Dunham, was the executive producer of Orgasm Inc: The Story of OneTaste, released on Netflix in November 2022. The film came out to mixed reviews and controversy, including hundreds of women and men claiming that that film used their image against their consent, filing a lawsuit against Netflix to disallow the film, signing petitions, and creating viral videos protesting the violation.

In 2024, Carr served as an executive producer on Perfect Wife: The Mysterious Disappearance of Sherri Papini. In the first week of the series release, 3.6 million viewers watched the series, making it Hulu's most viewed documentary. That same year, Carr directed and produced Fanatical: The Catfishing of Tegan and Sara.

In 2025, Carr was an executive producer on Trophy Wife: Murder on Safari. Carr was creator and executive producer on the 2025 scripted series Murdaugh: Death in the Family starring Jason Clarke and Patricia Arquette.

== Bibliography ==
In April 2019, Carr published a memoir called All That You Leave Behind: A Memoir for Random House. All That You Leave Behind started out as a self-published Medium article called Still Rendering that Carr wrote a year after her father's death. The book describes Carr's growth in her career as a documentary filmmaker and is a celebration of her father, David Carr, that includes emails and GChat and other records that documented her relationship with him.

- Carr, Erin Lee (July 28, 2011). "Growing a New Eye (With a Little Help From Technology and You)". VICE.
- Carr, Erin Lee (August 22, 2011). "The Rules of Modern Day Attraction". Motherboard. VICE.
- Carr, Erin Lee (October 24, 2011). "In the Uncensored Internet Age, There's Nothing Scarier Than A Hot Mic". VICE.
- Anderson, Brian; Carr, Erin Lee (November 18, 2011). "Who Smashed the Laptops from Occupy Wall Street? Inside the NYPD's Lost and Found". VICE.
- Carr, Erin Lee (November 21, 2011). "Video Essay: Free the Network". Sisyphus. 2012 (3).

== Personal life ==
Carr lives in New York City. Carr has discussed her struggles with alcohol and becoming sober. She is openly queer and married Michelle Toni Bruton in October 2026.

== Filmography ==
=== Film ===
Year	Title	Director	Producer	Notes
2012	Free the Network: Hackers Take Back the Web	No	Yes	Documentary
2012	First Animal to Survive in Space	No	Yes	Documentary
2012	The World's Hottest Taxidermist	No	Yes	Documentary
2012	Click. Print. Gun.	No	Yes	Documentary
2012	Picnic Table	No	Yes	Short
2015	Thought Crimes: The Case of the Cannibal Cop	Yes	Yes	Documentary
2015	Remembering David Carr	No	No	Documentary; self; special thanks
2017	Mommy Dead and Dearest	Yes	Yes	Documentary
2017	Whirlybird	No	Yes	Documentary
2019	I Love You, Now Die: The Commonwealth V. Michelle Carter	Yes	Yes	Documentary
2019	At the Heart of Gold: Inside the USA Gymnastics Scandal	Yes	Yes	Documentary
2021	Britney vs Spears	Yes	Yes	Documentary
2023	The Ringleader: The Case of the Bling Ring	Yes	Yes	Documentary
2024	Stormy	No	Yes	Documentary
2024	Fanatical: The Catfishing of Tegan and Sara	Yes	Yes	Documentary
2025	Trophy Wife: Murder on Safari	No	Yes	Documentary

=== TV series ===
Numbers in directing credits refer to number of episodes.

Year	Title	Director	Executive Producer	Notes
2013	My Life Online	No	Producer	Documentary series
2013	Spaced Out	No	Producer	Documentary series
2018	Dirty Money: Drug Short	Yes (1)	Yes	Documentary series
2020	How to Fix a Drug Scandal	Yes (4)	Producer	Documentary series
2022	Undercurrent: The Disappearance of Kim Wall	Yes (2)	Producer	Documentary series
2022	The Girl from Plainville	No	Consulting	Scripted series
2024	Perfect Wife: The Mysterious Disappearance of Sherri Papini	No	Yes	Documentary series
2024	I Am Not a Monster: The Lois Riess Murders	Yes (2)	Producer	Documentary series
2025	Murdaugh: Death in the Family	Yes (1)	Yes	Scripted series; also co-creator
