= Daphnée Duplaix =

Haitian-American actress

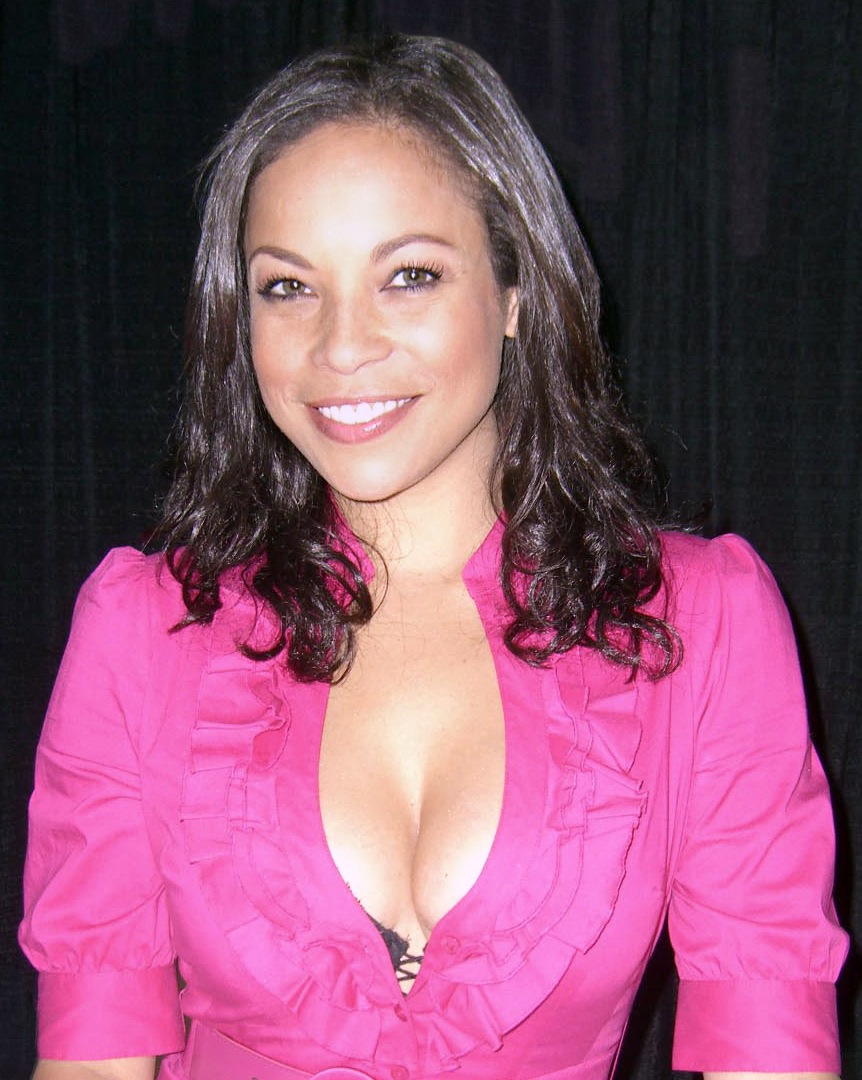
- Duplaix in 2009
- Born: Daphnee Lynn Duplaix; August 18, 1976 (age 50); Manhattan, New York, United States
- Other name: Daphnée Duplaix Samuel
- Occupations: Actress; model
- Years active: 1996–present
- Known for: Playboy Playmate (July 1997) and performance in American soap opera television
- Works: Filmography
- Spouses: Ron Samuel (divorced); Grady Heiberg (m. 2014)
- Children: 4

Playboy centerfold appearance
- July 1997
- Preceded by: Carrie Stevens
- Succeeded by: Kalin Olson

Daphnée Lynn Duplaix (born August 18, 1976) is a Haitian-American actress and model. After beginning her career as an actress in 1996, Duplaix appeared as the July 1997 centerfold as Playboy's Playmate of the Month. In addition to appearing in several videos for Playboy, she continued to act in mainstream projects, including roles on American daytime soap operas Passions and One Life to Live. In 2024, she joined the cast of Beyond the Gates as Nicole Dupree Richardson.

== Career ==
After appearing in Playboy magazine as Playmate of the Month July 1997, she appeared in several Playboy videos. Her Playmate pictorial was photographed by Richard Fegley.

In 2004, Duplaix joined the cast of Passions, a soap opera on the NBC network, in the series regular role of Valerie Davis. Following her exit from the role in 2008, she served as a host of the Playboy TV game show Show Us Your Wits in January 2009. In February of the same year, it was announced Duplaix had joined the cast of ABC's One Life to Live in the role of Rachel Gannon. The following year, it was announced she was exiting the role as a "storyline-dictated" decision.

In 2024, Duplaix joined the cast of Beyond the Gates as Nicole Dupree Richardson. The soap premiered in early 2025 on CBS.

== Personal life ==
Duplaix was previously married to Ron Samuel, with whom she has three sons. On June 28, 2014, she married Grady Heiberg. Their daughter was born in 2015.

== Filmography ==
=== Film ===
Year	Film	Role	Notes
1996	Striptease	Stripper	
1997	The Blackout	Fly Girl	
1997	Kickboxing Academy	Melinda	
1998	Let's Talk About Sex	Chloe	
1999	Foolish	Clarisse	
1999	Lost & Found	Flight Attendant	
2000	Kiss Tomorrow Goodbye	Salon Receptionist	TV movie
2002	Demon Island	Julie	
2003	The Road Home	Deidre	
2003	The Fighting Temptations	Tiffany	
2005	Heart of the Beholder	Detective Deborah Burbach	
2008	The Governor's Wife	Reporter Jill Quigly	TV movie
2013	I Married Who?	Jessica	TV movie
2014	Beautiful Girl	Brianna	
2014	The Cookie Mobster	Constance	TV movie
2014	Love in an INSTAnt	Daph	Short
2015	Ex-Free	Jessica	
2015	The Motel Sunset	Anna Motawbi	Short
2016	Unreported	Michelle	
2017	The Cheaters Club	Mrs. Idrid	
2022	Unreported	Michelle	
2024	RSVP	Eve	

=== Television ===
Year	Film	Role	Notes
1998	The Steve Harvey Show	Shelia	Episode: "Everybody Loves Regina"
1998	The Wayans Bros.	Tasha	Episode: "The High Life"
1999	Women: Stories of Passion	Dr. Merrill Thompson	Episode: "Voodoo"
1999	Rude Awakening	Cute Girl #2	Episode: "Powerless Over the What?"
1999	V.I.P.	Iris Leon	Episode: "Ransom of Red Val"
1999	City Guys	Rayna	Episode: "Marriage Go-Round"
1999	Just Shoot Me!	Tanya	Episode: "Hello Goodbye"
2000	Angel	Serena	Episode: "Expecting"
2000	For Your Love	April	Episode: "The Craving"
2000	The Parkers	Vanessa	Episode: "Cheers"
2001	Kate Brasher	Kelly	Episode: "Georgia"
2001	My Wife and Kids	Tiara	Episode: "A Little Romance"
2001	Felicity	Samantha	Recurring Cast: Season 3
2001	Off Centre	Sales Girl	Episode: "Let's Meet Mike and Euan"
2001–03	The District	Giselle	Recurring Cast: Season 1, Guest: Season 3
2002	Weakest Link	Herself	Episode: "Playboy Playmates Edition"
2002	The Invisible Man	Rachel	Episode: "Mere Mortals"
2002	Dharma & Greg	Laura Butler	Episode: "The Mamas and the Papas: Part 1 & 2"
2002	Half & Half	Geneva	Episode: "The Big Upsetting Set-Up"
2003	CSI	Amelia Rueben	Episode: "Grissom Versus the Volcano"
2004–2008	Passions	Valerie Davis	Series regular
2005	Sex, Love & Secrets	Melanie	Recurring Cast
2009	CSI: NY	Dr. Catherine Rydell	Episode: "No Good Deed"
2009–2010	One Life to Live	Rachel Gannon	Series regular
2011	Harry's Law	Barbara	Episode: "Wheels of Justice"
2011	Last Man Standing	Misty Cavanaugh	Episode: "Home Security"
2011	Femme Fatales	Alexis	Episode: "Speed Date"
2012	House of Lies	Alisette Kauffman	Episode: "The Gods of Dangerous Financial Instruments"
2013	The Mindy Project	Woman #2	Episode: "Mindy's Minute"
2025	St. Denis Medical	Amelia Irving	Episode: "Bruce-ic and the Mus-ic"
2025–present	Beyond the Gates	Nicole Dupree Richardson	Series regular

Jami Ferrell	Kimber West	Jennifer Miriam	Kelly Monaco	Lynn Thomas	Carrie Stevens
Daphnée Duplaix	Kalin Olson	Nikki Ziering	Layla Roberts	Inga Drozdova	Karen McDougal
