= I'm Not a Monster: The Lois Riess Murders =

- Directed by: Erin Lee Carr
- Music by: Justin Melland
- Country of origin: United States
- Original language: English
- No. of episodes: 2

Production
- Executive producers: Brian Grazer; Ron Howard; Sara Bernstein; Justin Wilkes; Meredith Kaulfers; Ted Schillinger; Nancy Abraham; Lisa Heller; Sara Rodriguez
- Producer: Erin Lee Carr
- Cinematography: Michael Beach Nichols; Shane Sigler
- Editors: Becky Goldberg; Jason Sager
- Running time: 85-87 minutes
- Production companies: HBO Documentary Films; Imagine Documentaries; Carr Lot Productions

Original release
- Network: HBO
- Release: October 15 – October 16, 2024

I’m Not a Monster: The Lois Riess Murders is an American two-part documentary series, directed and produced by Erin Lee Carr. It follows Lois Riess, a Minnesota mother and grandmother who kills her husband, goes on the run and commits another murder in Florida, gets captured in Texas in 2018. She is convicted for both crimes and five years later grants her first interview from prison.

It premiered October 15–16, 2024, on HBO.

== Premise ==
Lois Riess, a Minnesota woman accused of murder who goes on the run and is later convicted, sits down for her first interview. Additionally family members, journalists, addiction specialists, and a potential victim are interviewed.

== Episodes ==
No.	Title	Directed by	Original release date	U.S. viewers (millions)
1	"Part One"	Erin Lee Carr	October 15, 2024	N/A
2	"Part Two"	Erin Lee Carr	October 16, 2024	N/A

== Production ==
Erin Lee Carr interviewed Lois Riess from prison. Carr was interested in the story as she wanted to make something revolving around someone middle age not receiving attention throughout their life.

Brian Grazer and Ron Howard serve as executive producers under their Imagine Documentaries banner.

== Reception ==
Joel Keller of Decider suggested viewing the series writing: "Fascinating because of the fact that Riess could be a troubled but largely emotionally stable woman who snapped or she could be a sociopath, and the interview with her that's the centerpiece of this series keeps us guessing in that regard."
