= Workshop (web series) =

- Genre: Comedy
- Created by: Nate Golon, Kimberly Legg
- Directed by: Andre Welsh
- Starring: Nate Golon; Kimberly Legg; Phillip Jeanmarie; Leanne Wilson; Jonathan Schwartz; Audra Marie
- Country of origin: United States
- Original language: English
- No. of seasons: 2
- No. of episodes: 19

Production
- Producer: Nate Golon
- Production locations: Los Angeles, California
- Running time: Season 1, 7–10 minutes per episode. Season 2, 22 minutes per episode.
- Production company: More Than Productions

Original release
- Network: YouTube; Hulu
- Release: August 10, 2009 – May 10, 2011

Workshop is a comedic web series about the lives of struggling, young actors and actresses trying to make it in Hollywood. The series, written about actors by actors, contains many influences from the cast's personal lives. Nate Golon, executive producer and co-creator, said this about the show, “We basically expanded on the idea of all the things we had to deal with and then we made it goofier.”

Season 2 premiered on Hulu on April 7, 2011, as six episodes of 22 minutes, making it the first ever independently produced half-hour comedy to air on Hulu. Special guest stars in Season 2 include Don Stark from That '70s Show, Josh Meyers from That '70s Show and MADtv, and Marie Wilson from As the World Turns.

The series has been noted for its clean dialogue and content, traits not always shared by web content. Golon stated this was to promote accessibility to a large audience.

== Characters and Cast ==
- Jeff Reynolds – Portrayed by Nate Golon.
- Kaitlyn Murray – Portrayed by Kimberly Legg.
- Adam Saltair – Portrayed by Phillip Jeanmarie.
- Vivian Smith – Portrayed by Leanne Wilson.
- Matthew Cunningham – Portrayed by Jonathan Schwartz.
- Sarah Clarkson – Portrayed by Audra Marie.
