= Vincent Clarkson =

Fictional character in Passions

- Passions character
- Phillip Jeanmarie as Vincent Clarkson
- Portrayed by: Daphnée Duplaix (2004–2008); Phillip Jeanmarie (2006–2008); Siena Goines (2007)
- Duration: 2004–2008
- First appearance: December 16, 2004
- Last appearance: July 14, 2008
- Created by: James E. Reilly
- Book appearances: Hidden Passions: Secrets from the Diaries of Tabitha Lenox
- Daphnée Duplaix as Valerie Davis
In-universe information
- Other names: Valerie Davis; Vincent Crane; Dolly; The Blackmailer
- Occupation: Executive assistant at Crane Industries; Tabloid reporter
- Family: Crane
- Parents: Julian Crane; Eve Russell
- Half-brothers: Fox Crane (deceased); Unnamed boy
- Half-sisters: Fancy Crane; Whitney Russell; Pretty Crane; Simone Russell; Endora Lenox
- Sons: JJ Crane
- Grandparents: Alistair Crane; Katherine Crane; Warren Johnson; Ruby Lincoln
- Aunts and uncles: Sheridan Crane; Beth Wallace; Chad Harris-Crane; Liz Sanbourne (adoptive)
- Nephews: Miles Harris-Crane
- First cousins: James Boothe (adoptive) Marty Lopez-Fitzgerald Miles Harris-Crane Chad Harris-Crane (adoptive)
- Other relatives: Rachel Barrett

Vincent Clarkson, also known by the alter ego Valerie Davis, is a fictional character from the American soap opera Passions. Created by the soap's founder and head writer James E. Reilly, Vincent was portrayed by Phillip Jeanmarie from 2006 to 2008. Valerie was played by Daphnée Duplaix from 2004 to 2008, and temporarily by Siena Goines in 2007. Jeanmarie auditioned for the role of a peeping tom before the role was expanded as the show progressed.

Jeanmarie and Duplaix were both unaware that Vincent and Valerie were the same character until receiving the script and shooting the scenes. Jeanmarie approached playing Vincent through his abuse as a child by his grandfather Alistair Crane, interpreting him as a character constantly searching for acceptance. The character received a more uncertain response from the show's other cast members.

Vincent, part of Passions' Russell family and Crane family, is the long-lost son of Julian Crane and Eve Russell. Mentally unstable and violent from years of abuse from Alistair, he appears initially under the alias Valerie Davis, but his later persona as the "Blackmailer", and his criminal actions, dominate the show in its later years. He received further prominence for his incestuous affair with Chad Harris-Crane, sexual identity as intersex, and pregnancy with his father's child.

Critical response to Vincent was mixed; some reviewers praised the soap opera's decision to include lesbian, gay, bisexual, and transgender (LGBT) characters and topics, while others criticized his relationship with Chad and actions as the "Blackmailer" as irresponsible and problematic representations of racial and sexual identity. Despite negative attention toward the character, Jeanmarie and Duplaix's performance garnered some positive reviews. The character marks a notable step in daytime television and soap opera history; it was the first depiction in a soap opera of two men having sex. Vincent has also been cited as expanding the representation of LGBT characters of color on daytime television.

== Background ==
=== Creation and casting ===
Sheraton Kalouria, senior vice president of NBC's daytime programming, described the show's use of color-blind casting as part of an effort to build a diverse pool of characters that best reflected the various ethnic and racial groups living in the United States. Kalouria believed the show was set apart from other soap operas by the inclusion of "the African American Russells and the Hispanic Lopez-Fitzgeralds".

The character was portrayed by Phillip Jeanmarie over the course of the series, while Valerie was played by two actors: Daphnée Duplaix (2004 to 2008) and Siena Goines (2007). Jeanmarie and Duplaix were both originally unaware of the story arcs planned for Vincent Clarkson while they performed the role. Jeanmarie had originally auditioned for the part of a peeping tom, which would be expanded into the character of Vincent. In a retrospective interview, he praised the soap's creator and head writer James E. Reilly for taking risks through writing an intersex villain while remaining true to his "tongue-in-cheek approach to his storytelling". Jeanmarie stated that he enjoyed portraying the antagonist, and described Vincent as a "surprising and challenging" character to portray given the twists in his narrative. Reilly and the series' writing teams did not inform Jeanmarie about any of their intended developments until the read-through and the shooting of his scenes. The actor believed the decision prevent him from overthinking the character and allowed him to act on his instinct; Jeanmarie has cited the series as expanding his abilities as an actor, saying the experience was similar to "being paid to go to acting school".

When discussing her approach to portray Valerie Davis, Duplaix stated that she was unaware that her character was secretly Vincent's split personality. Echoing Jeanmarie's comments, the actress confirmed that the show's cast were purposefully kept unaware of their characters' future storylines until they were given the final copies of the scripts. Duplaix played the role from December 16, 2004 to May 28, 2008; Siena Goines temporarily played the character from January 20, 2007 to March 29, 2007 while Duplaix was on maternity leave.

=== Characterization ===
Jeanmarie attempted to reconcile Vincent's psychotic behavior with his approach to the character over the course of the series. He said that he imagined Vincent as a character in constant pursuit of love. He described Vincent as "horribly scarred" from the abuse by his grandfather Alistair Crane, opining that his criminal and immoral behavior was intended to repress his desire for acceptance. In an interview about the character's impact, Jeanmarie commented that he was glad to have been a part of the taboo-breaking story. Daytime Confidential's Jamey Giddens described Vincent's storyline as the "Blackmailer" as consisting of a "reign of terror [that] dominated the last few years of the series". He described the character as a "seemingly omnipotent, omnipresent force".

Other Passions cast members had a more uncertain understanding of the character. Tracey Ross, who portrayed Eve Russell, responded negatively to Vincent's involvement in her character's storylines. While discussing the filming of the scenes in which Vincent gives birth to his father's child, Ross said she felt "physically nauseous" and could only complete them after the show's acting coach, Maria O'Brien, convinced her of "[their] comedic possibilities". Vincent's manipulation of Eve to incorrectly reattach Julian's penis was criticized by co-star McKenzie Westmore, ("This has got to be the worst storyline ever done, what are they doing?"), who cited it as a reason for the show's cancellation. Kim Johnston Ulrich, who played Ivy Winthrop, said she was confused by Vincent's story arcs even though she was a fan of the series' supernatural elements.

== Appearances ==
=== 2001: Hidden Passions: Secrets from the Diaries of Tabitha Lenox ===
The 2001 novel Hidden Passions: Secrets from the Diaries of Tabitha Lenox, published by HarperEntertainment as a tie-in novelization, expanded on the backstories of Passions' prominent characters, such as the romantic relationship between Eve Russell and Julian Crane and the fate of their child. Promoted as being written by the witch Tabitha Lenox and her living doll sidekick Timmy Lenox, the book was in reality composed by Reilly in collaboration with writer Alice Alfonsi. According to the novel, Vincent was born on Christmas day. Alistair Crane arranges for Vincent to be killed, but the hitman places the baby into social services without his knowledge. In the series, Alistair does not order for Vincent's death, and instead kidnaps him as an infant to abuse him and turn him into a tool for his schemes to maintain control over the fictional town of Harmony.

=== 2004–2008: Passions ===
Vincent first appears in the December 16, 2004 episode as his alter-ego Valerie Davis. While working as an executive assistant to Crane Industries' vice president Theresa Lopez-Fitzgerald, Valerie is characterized through her connection with the Crane family and past sexual encounter with Chad Harris-Crane. Vincent had fabricated a backstory for Valerie to maintain the illusion that they were two separate people. Valerie joins Crane Industries to change its lack of minority employees. Initially appearing as a supporting character, Valerie helps Ivy Winthrop in her attempts to break up Fox Crane and Kay Bennett and supports Chad during their job. She gains more prominence when Eve catches her having sex with Julian; they engage in a catfight with Eve accusing Valerie of using sex to climb the corporate ladder. During this time, Whitney Russell suspects that Valerie is having an affair with Chad. Vincent is first seen outside of his split-personality when he introduces himself as a tabloid reporter at Chad and Whitney's wedding on December 26, 2006. Whitney sets up Vincent and Valerie as a couple without knowing they are in fact the same person.

From 2006 to 2007, Vincent adopts the disguise of the "Blackmailer" to rape, murder, and blackmail several of the show's characters. Alistair (who was presumed dead at the time), had manipulated Vincent into performing these criminal actions. Vincent's first act as the "Blackmailer" is to repeatedly rape his paternal half-sister Fancy Crane; he frames Fancy's boyfriend Luis Lopez-Fitzgerald for the rapes by planting his semen inside her. After his maternal half-sister Simone Russell's girlfriend Rae Thomas learns the truth, he murders her and frames Luis for the crime. As the storyline progresses, Vincent begins to harbor an obsession with Theresa's love interest Ethan Winthrop and blackmails Judge JE Reilly into sentencing Luis to death by lethal injection. Vincent's aunt Sheridan Crane was the only person to identify him, but she keeps his secret on the sole condition that he brings her niece Pretty Crane back to Harmony to destroy Fancy's relationship with Luis. Vincent convinces Sheridan to kill Theresa with an electric chair, but she is interrupted by Theresa's rival Gwen Hotchkiss.

In February 2007, Vincent is revealed to have been engaging in an incestuous and adulterous affair with Chad, which was cited as starting prior to the show's storyline in Rome in the summer of 2006. Chad is unaware that Vincent is Eve's child with Julian and his half-brother, making Vincent his half-uncle, adoptive half-cousin, and half-brother-in-law. Vincent blackmails Chad with secret videos of their sexual encounters. Furious with Chad for continuing to sleep with Whitney, Vincent engineers a scenario in which Whitney sees Vincent and Chad having sex in the back of a gay bar; Whitney immediately leaves Chad and Chad distances himself from Vincent. Chad informs Valerie of Vincent's infidelity after overhearing the two fight; Chad, as well as the viewer, is unaware that Vincent and Valerie are the same person. As the incest storyline progresses, Vincent reveals to Julian and Eve his secret identities as the "Blackmailer" and their son. For most of the series, Eve and Julian's child was believed to be Chad, who is later shown to be Eve's adoptive sister Liz Sanbourne's child from her rape by Alistair.

Despite Julian's insistence that they protect their son and the Crane name, Eve tells the police that Vincent is the "Blackmailer" and Luis is set free moments before his execution. Vincent is then arrested and placed in psychiatric care. Alistair helps Vincent to escape, but hires assassin Spike Lester to murder him. Vincent is rescued by Sheridan and they escape Harmony by car while pursued by Spike. Vincent and Spike fall over the side of a cliff, and Sheridan can only save one of the two men. She chooses to save Spike after he reveals her son Marty is still alive. Vincent plummets to his (apparent) death on August 30, 2007. A few episodes later, Vincent emerges from the ocean and goes to Valerie's house to attack her off-screen for exposing his secrets. In the show's final episode on NBC on September 7, 2007, Valerie removes her mask to reveal she is in fact Vincent; it is strongly implied that Vincent has dissociative identity disorder.

In November 2007, Vincent runs a blood test on himself after experiencing what appears to be symptoms of morning sickness and discovers he is pregnant. Eve inspects Vincent (who is dressed as Valerie) on November 22, 2007 and discovers his pregnancy and his true gender identity as intersex. Vincent torments Eve out of revenge for her failure to prevent his abduction when he was born and to prevent her from telling anyone that he was still alive and pregnant with Julian's child. After his psychopathic accomplice Viki Chatsworth severs Julian's penis, Vincent plies Eve with drugs and alcohol so she botches her attempt to surgically reattach Julian's penis; she reattaches it upside-down, and an erection might kill him. In May 2008, Eve and Julian assist Vincent with the birth of his son on the Russells' kitchen table after Eve explains everything about Vincent and Valerie to Julian. Eve plans to form a relationship again with Vincent (believing that motherhood has mellowed him), and convinces Julian not to turn him in to the police. During the rehearsal dinner for the joint weddings of Luis Lopez-Fitzgerald and Fancy Crane, Noah Bennett and Paloma Lopez-Fitzgerald, Miguel Lopez-Fitzgerald and Kay Bennett, and Edna Wallace and Norma Bates, Vincent and Viki kill all the guests with a poison mushroom sauce, but Tabitha gives up her powers and becomes a born again Christian in order to resurrect everyone. Vincent is last seen being arrested by Chief of Police Sam Bennett. Since T. C. Russell, Whitney, and Simone moved to New Orleans in 2007, Eve and Vincent are the only two members of the Russell family to appear in the series finale.

== Reception and impact ==
Herndon L. Davis heavily criticized Vincent's story arc as the "Blackmailer" as irresponsible in terms of racial and sexual identity.

Following the soap opera's cancellation, Vincent's arc was frequently cited as one of its most outrageous storylines. Ira Madison III of BuzzFeed noted the similarities between Vincent and Pretty Little Liars' Charlotte DiLaurentis, who was revealed to be a transgender woman who dated her own brother and operated under the disguise A. The reveal that Vincent was the "Blackmailer", Eve and Julian's son, and Valerie was cited as one of Passions' biggest twists by a writer from Soap Opera Digest. Joel McHale from E!'s weekly television series The Soup turned a scene in which Chad insisted he was "not gay" despite his affair with Vincent into a running gag by referring to the character as "Not Gay Chad". During the show's season five premiere, Divins made a cameo appearance on The Soup to explain that he was not his character and was neither gay nor having sex with transsexuals.

Viewers were divided over the sexually explicit sequences between Chad and Vincent. Some felt the scenes between Chad and Vincent were "appalling" and inappropriate for daytime television, while one viewer praised the soap opera for "continu[ing] their outstanding jobs as they teach the people of today's world about daily life experiences". A writer from Soaps.com defended the show by pointing out graphic sex scenes between men and women were previously aired without complaint.

Jeanmarie and Duplaix's performances received some positive critical responses. Giddens praised Jeanmarie for portraying Vincent as a believable character despite the sensationalism of his story arcs; he wrote: "If anyone on that show could have won an Emmy it was him." Josh Robertson of Complex called Duplaix one of the most successful soap actresses, who had been a Playboy Playmate, for her performances as Valerie in thirty-four episodes of Passions, along with her portrayal of Rachel Gannon in ninety-five episodes of One Life to Live.

=== Racial and LGBT criticism ===
Passions made daytime history by being the first to depict two men having sex. However, the pairing of Chad and Vincent drew less media attention than the gay relationships in As the World Turns and One Life to Live. The incest storyline involving the two characters was described as "insanely convoluted" by Gawker's Kyle Buchanan, who felt it was one of "the most insane things that have ever happened on television". The plotline was praised by a writer from Soaps.com for reflecting the show's "unique perspective and zest for controversy" while challenging the "often too safe and predictable world of soaps". NewNowNext.com's Brent Hartinger approved of the story arc and felt that it increased the presence of LGBT people of color on daytime television. Ross von Metze of Edge Media Network commented that the show was "taking risks where other TV shows have failed". Mike Perigard of the Boston Herald was more critical of Vincent and the soap opera's treatment of LGBT characters. Perigard argued that Rae Thomas' death was timed alongside the reveal of Chad's affair with a man as a means to reduce the number of gay characters on the show.

Several media outlets negatively responded to Vincent's identification as the "Blackmailer" and his relationship with Chad. Herndon L. Davis of Windy City Times was critical of the character's development, saying the soap opera "recklessly wrote a down-low storyline which involved an African-American man but eventually turned it into an outrageous intersex serial killer storyline". Perigard criticized the storyline as "just vile", and Ira Madison III called the representation of the character "horrifying and offensive".

== See also ==
- List of LGBT characters in television and radio
