= Fanatical: The Catfishing of Tegan and Sara =

2024 American documentary film

- Directed by: Erin Lee Carr
- Produced by: Erin Lee Carr; Elyssa Hess; Jenny Eliscu
- Cinematography: Ava Benjamin Shorr
- Edited by: Tim K. Smith
- Production companies: Story Syndicate; Carr Lot Productions
- Distributed by: Hulu
- Release dates: September 13, 2024 (TIFF); October 18, 2024 (United States)
- Running time: 99 minutes
- Country: United States
- Language: English

Fanatical: The Catfishing of Tegan and Sara is a 2024 American documentary film, directed and produced by Erin Lee Carr. It follows fans of Tegan and Sara, who are subject to a catfishing scheme.

It had its world premiere at the 2024 Toronto International Film Festival on September 13, 2024, and released on October 18, 2024, on Hulu.

== Premise ==
Fans of the band Tegan and Sara are subject to a catfishing scheme when someone pretends to be Tegan.

== Production ==
In July 2024, it was announced Erin Lee Carr had directed a documentary revolving around Tegan and Sara, with Hulu set to distribute.

While making the film, Erin Lee Carr did not want participants to feel they would be embarrassed, as well as Tegan not wanting it to feel as though they were calling out their fans.

== Release ==
It had its world premiere at the 2024 Toronto International Film Festival on September 13, 2024. It was released on October 18, 2024, by Hulu.
