= The Ringleader: The Case of the Bling Ring =

2023 documentary film by Erin Lee Carr

- Release poster
- Directed by: Erin Lee Carr
- Produced by: Erin Lee Carr; Dani Sloane
- Cinematography: David Bolen
- Edited by: Sunita Prasad
- Music by: Chanell Crichlow; Michael Tuller
- Production companies: HBO Documentary Films; Story Syndicate; Carr Lot Productions
- Distributed by: HBO
- Release date: October 1, 2023
- Running time: 95 minutes
- Country: United States
- Language: English

The Ringleader: The Case of the Bling Ring is a 2023 American documentary film directed and produced by Erin Lee Carr. It follows Rachel Lee, the alleged mastermind behind The Bling Ring robberies speaking out about her experience for the first time.

== Plot ==
Rachel Lee, the alleged mastermind behind the Bling Ring speaks out for the first time. Journalists, Amy Kaufman and Allen Salkin, district attorneys, Christine Kee, and Sarika Kim, victim Eden Shizzle, and Lee's father, David Lee, appear in the film.

== Production ==
Lee has received messages, letters, and voicemails requesting an interview about her experience in the Bling Ring, which she declined feeling it was not right. Initially, Lee wanted to do a podcast; however, Erin Lee Carr contacted Lee, and the two had conversations about what would make Lee comfortable participating in a documentary. Carr scrapped days of interviews with Lee, feeling she was not being truthful, pushing her to be more open and honest, which she eventually became.

== Release ==
The film premiered on HBO on October 1, 2023.
