= Double or nothing =

Decision in gambling that will either double one's losses or cancel them out

Double or nothing (UK often double or quits) is a gamble to decide whether a loss or debt should be doubled. The result of a "double or nothing" bet is either cancellation of a debt or the doubling of a debt. It can be seen as a gentleman's agreement which grants losers of an initial bet a chance to win their money back, with minimal risk to the winner.

== Example ==
- Person A wins an initial $5 bet against Person B.
- Before the initial bet is repaid, Person A and Person B agree to a second bet, also in the amount of $5 because the bet was doubled or "Double or Nothing".
  - If person A wins bet 2, they are owed $10 total from Person B. $5 from the first bet + $5 from the second = $10 total.
  - If person B wins bet 2, person B no longer owes any money to person A. If person B lost they would owe double but since they won, they owe nothing. The original bet is null.

== Poker ==
In poker, a double or nothing tournament is a sit'n'go tournament where half of the surviving players get double the buy-in and the eliminated half does not receive any prizes. Double or nothing tournaments are mostly played by ten players (five players win) or six players (three-win), although multi-table versions, such as for 20 players, exist. The rake in these tournaments is usually smaller than in standard sit'n'go tournaments. Some poker rooms also offer triple or nothing tournaments, where one-third of the playing field gets paid.

== Game shows ==
Game shows which use the double or nothing concept include the radio shows Double or Nothing and Take It or Leave It and the video series Don't Forget the Lyrics!, Track Star, and Show Us Your Wits. Modified versions of double or nothing appeared in The $64,000 Question and Who Wants to Be a Millionaire?

== See also ==
- Escalation of commitment – Human behavior pattern in which the participant takes on increasing risk
- Martingale (betting system) – Gambling strategy where the amount is raised until a person wins or becomes insolvent
- St. Petersburg paradox – Paradox involving a game with repeated coin flipping
- Sunk cost fallacy – Cost that has already been incurred and cannot be recovered
