= Alistair Crane =

- Passions character
- John Reilly as Alistair Crane
- Portrayed by: Alan Oppenheimer (1999–2004; voice); Bill Dempsey (1999–2004; body double); Jordan Baker (2003; as Charlie); David Bailey (2004–05); John Reilly (2005–08)
- Duration: 1999–2008
- First appearance: August 23, 1999
- Last appearance: May 20, 2008
- Created by: James E. Reilly
- Book appearances: Hidden Passions
- David Bailey as Alistair Crane
In-universe information
- Occupation: Founder and CEO of Crane Industries
- Family: Crane
- Spouse: Katherine Barrett; Theresa Lopez-Fitzgerald (2005–08)
- Sons: Julian Crane; Chad Harris-Crane
- Daughters: Sheridan Crane; Beth Wallace
- Adoptive sons: Ethan Winthrop II
- Grandchildren: Vincent Clarkson; Fancy Crane; Fox Crane; Pretty Crane; Endora Lenox; James Boothe; Marty Lopez-Fitzgerald; Miles Harris-Crane; Baby Harris-Crane
- Uncles: Thaddeus Crane
- Other relatives: JJ Crane

Alistair Crane is a fictional character from the NBC and DirecTV daytime soap opera Passions. The role was most notably portrayed by John Reilly from January 21st, 2005 to May 20th, 2008, as well as David Bailey from September 27th, 2004 to January 13th, 2005.

An extremely powerful and wealthy businessman, Alistair is, for the first five years of the program, a mysterious character whose face is never directly seen by the audience. Upon the recasting of the role with Bailey in 2004, Alistair becomes one of the soap's primary villains, expanding his focus from daughter Sheridan and her lover, Luis Lopez-Fitzgerald, to all of Harmony's citizens. Upon this transformation, many of the most nefarious non-magical schemes in Harmony such as the omega plot in 2006 and the Blackmailer's reign of terror in 2007 are written as being Alistair's handiwork. Alistair is frequently regarded as being pure evil; he expresses racist, sexist, and homophobic beliefs, and all of his known relationships are based on a megalomaniacal need to control his family members and sexual partners.

== Character history ==
=== Life before 1999 ===
Alistair Ephraim Crane was born into the wealthy, prestigious Crane family of Harmony, New England. Alistair's parents were cold and unloving, and he grew up to be a bitter and harsh man himself. As a young man, he became engaged to fellow socialite Rachel Barrett, whom he loved deeply, but when she discovered his true nature, she broke off their engagement. Unable to let her go, Alistair kidnapped Rachel and faked her death in a boating accident.

After Rachel's apparent death, Alistair married her younger sister, Katherine, who was blind to Alistair's dominating nature until after they had married. Early in their marriage, Katherine gave birth to the couple's son, Julian Linus Crane, whom Alistair raised and molded in his own image to ensure that the Crane empire would live on. Several years later, when Julian was a teenager, Katherine gave birth to the couple's second child, a daughter named Sheridan Crane.

Alistair never loved Katherine and regularly abused her—physically, verbally, emotionally, and sexually. He also regularly cheated on her with other women, and one such liaison in the 1970s with Edna Wallace resulted in the birth of a daughter, Beth Wallace. Not all of Alistair's extramarital affairs were consensual, however—while visiting Julian in Boston, he raped Julian's girlfriend's fourteen-year-old sister, Liz Sanbourne, resulting in the birth of a son, Chad Harris (later Harris-Crane), whom Liz gave up for adoption.

Alistair was an emotionally distant father; he tolerated Julian as his heir and paid little attention to Sheridan when she was young. Alistair strove to ready Julian to take over the Crane empire some day in the future and felt that he needed a "socially acceptable" wife. When he learned that Julian had bedded and impregnated an African American woman, Eve Johnson, Alistair ordered Julian to leave her and marry Ivy Winthrop, daughter of the state's former governor, and then had Julian and Eve's son kidnapped at birth; he later faked the baby's death, blaming it on Eve's drug and alcohol abuse early in her pregnancy.

Sometime in the 1980s, Rachel escaped from Alistair's clutches and confronted him at the mansion, preparing to kill him. A young Sheridan, however, stabbed Rachel with a letter opener, allowing Alistair to spirit Rachel away to Hawaii under the care of Otto Krause. There, Rachel escaped and threw herself off a cliff into the Pacific Ocean; her body was never recovered, and she was presumed deceased. Also during that decade, Katherine ran off with Crane employee Martin Fitzgerald to Mexico; Alistair, to save himself and his empire from the humiliation and scandal of Katherine's actions, faked his wife's death and secretly had their marriage annulled.

=== The faceless years, 1999–2004 ===
For the soap's first five years, Alistair is a mysterious character whose face is never revealed to the audience; only his torso and hands, usually holding a cigar, are shown, though the back of Alistair's head is occasionally seen. Alistair's villainous plots usually only pertain to the protection of Crane empire in these years and he spends a great deal of energy trying to keep Julian and grandson Ethan under his control. After Julian repeatedly fails in carrying out his requests, Alistair disinherits him in favor of Ethan in 2000, and then disinherits Ethan later that year when he breaks off his engagement to Gwen Hotchkiss in favor of marrying Theresa Lopez-Fitzgerald.

During this time, however, Alistair considers the greatest threat to his empire to be Sheridan's relationship with Luis Lopez-Fitzgerald. Alistair fears that Luis, a police officer with a deep hatred for the Cranes, will use his position as Sheridan's husband to discover Alistair's secrets and conspires with Julian in 2000 to make Sheridan believe that Luis is using her by fitting an actor with a mask of Luis's face; Luis and Sheridan eventually uncover the plot, but are unable to prove that Alistair is involved. Luis and Sheridan become engaged, and Alistair, desperate to keep the two apart, resorts to murdering his own daughter in order to keep the two apart. First, he has Julian and Rebecca poison Sheridan's wedding ring, but when Ivy Crane drives her car into St. Margaret Mary's in an attempt to stop Ethan and Theresa's nuptials, the double wedding is called off, and Sheridan is temporarily saved. Luis and Sheridan choose to go on their honeymoon to Bermuda anyway, and while they are out in the Atlantic on a boat, they discover that Alistair has planted a bomb on board; it explodes, and Sheridan is presumably killed in the blast.

Much to Alistair's chagrin, Sheridan returns to Harmony alive and well in 2002—but, in the intervening time, she has become engaged to Luis's long-missing older brother, Antonio. Sheridan and Antonio are married in January 2003, but Sheridan continues sleeping with Luis and eventually becomes pregnant with his child.

Alistair, posing as Charlie, hugs accomplice (and yet-to-be-revealed daughter) Beth Wallace

Alistair then disguises himself as a lesbian with a grudge against blondes named Charlie and teams up with Luis's ex-fiancée, Beth Wallace, to kidnap Sheridan and hold her prisoner in a pit in Beth's basement until she gives birth. Sheridan bears a son, whom Beth later names Marty, in September 2003, and mother and baby are quickly separated from one another. Beth throws Sheridan into the ocean attached to an anchor, and Alistair drives off a cliff with an empty infant car seat in the back seat; both "Charlie" and Luis and Sheridan's baby are presumed dead, and Beth passes Marty off as her child with Luis.

Sheridan is an emotional wreck after the presumed death of her baby, and Alistair convinces the weak-minded Antonio to place his wife in a psychiatric ward in 2004. There, Alistair arranges for Sheridan to be administered electric shock therapy until she forgets her love for Luis; when she finally does remember, Antonio kidnaps her and forces her onto the Crane jet in hopes of leaving Harmony, and Alistair has the plane blown up, unaware that Antonio experiences a change of heart and lets Sheridan leave. As a result, only Antonio is killed.

Luis and Sheridan flee to Puerto Arena, Mexico, in part to escape Alistair's wrath and in part to bring Luis's youngest sister, Paloma, home to Harmony. While watching Luis and Sheridan, Alistair realizes that Katherine is living in Puerto Arena with Martin Fitzgerald under the aliases of Ellen and Bob Wheeler. Alistair attempts several times to murder the five, but to no avail.

=== Reign of terror, 2004–06 ===
The Crane patriarch's reign of terror over Harmony's citizens truly begins on September 27, 2004, when viewers glimpse Alistair's face for the first time. Alistair takes great joy in tormenting his newly returned wife and eventually sends Katherine to a Crane compound in the North Atlantic in early 2005; there, he holds Katherine, along with stowaways Gwen and Jane Winthrop and would-be rescuer grandson Fox Crane, captive, rapes Katherine and physically assaults Gwen. Later, when DNA testing proves Sheridan, and not Beth, to be Marty's biological mother, Alistair assists Beth, who is revealed to be the product of his one-night stand with former Harmony harlot Edna Wallace, in escaping the country with his grandson. Sheridan is furious with Luis for refusing to believe her unfounded claims about Marty's maternity, and Luis sets off to find Marty on his own. While he is in Tangier, Alistair has Luis attacked and kidnapped, and holds him prisoner in the same Hawaiian compound that he had once used to house Rachel; Alistair then fakes Luis's death in October 2005.

Alistair's softer side is only seen around his beloved granddaughter, Julian's eldest daughter Fancy, whom he considers to be his favorite family member and the only "true Crane" of the bunch. When Fancy complains to her "grampy" of the treatment to which she had been subjected at Noah Bennett's hands, Alistair declares war on the Bennett family; he first has Sam Bennett fired from his position as chief of police, which he had held since July 1999, and then has his henchman, Spike, lead Sam's troubled daughter Jessica into a life of drugs and prostitution. When he witnesses Fancy having sex with Noah on the beach, Alistair becomes enraged and has Sam's youngest son arrested on false drug and weapon charges.

In mid-2005, Alistair also enters into an alliance with Theresa Lopez-Fitzgerald, promising to help her retain her ex-fiancé Ethan Winthrop and daughter, Jane, from her archrival, Gwen, in exchange for her services as his mistress; when Theresa refuses to fulfill her end of the bargain, Alistair rapes her. Still, Theresa's determination to win back Ethan is so great that she marries Alistair on October 3, 2005. In their prenup, Alistair includes provisions that allow him to adopt Theresa and Julian's nine-year-old son, Little Ethan, and make him his heir, disinheriting the rest of his family. Alistair takes great pleasure in sexually abusing his young wife and flaunts his efforts to turn their son into a "true Crane" in her face. After learning of her brother Luis's death, Theresa's thoughts toward her husband become murderous, and she attempts several times to kill Alistair, most notably with a batch of poisoned guacamole that Ethan ingests instead.

Alistair seems to have finally been put out of commission at his New Year's Eve party, appropriately themed "A Murder Is Announced", when Liz Sanbourne, in retaliation for her rape and subsequent pregnancy at his hands, stabs him in the neck. He lapses into a coma and is placed into Lyndon Hill Nursing Home sometime between February 27 and April 13, 2006. At some point during this time, Alistair emerges from his coma and pays the director of the nursing home to keep his recovery quiet; he then has another comatose man fitted with a latex mask of his face in order to convince his enemies that he is still unconscious so that he can carry out his omega plot.

With everyone believing him to be in a coma, Alistair disguises himself as a monk and convinces novice Whitney Russell that he is God. Eager to atone for committing incest with Chad, Whitney follows Alistair to Rome and helps him to come into possession of a chalice belonging to the Pope that will allow whoever unlocks its secrets to become omnipotent. Although Alistair is able to gain some of the chalice's powers, tabloid editor J. T. Cornell steals the chalice, and Chad later recovers and returns it to the Vatican.

While scheming to become omnipotent, several of Alistair's other plots are also revealed. In June, Noah discovers that Alistair ordered terrorist Lena and his ex-girlfriend, Maya Chinn, to convince him that Fancy's life was in danger in order to tear the two apart; though Noah tries to convince Fancy that he only pretended to cheat on her for her protection, a storm that Alistair unleashes over Rome takes Lena and Maya's lives, leaving Noah without anyone to back up his story. In Alistair's subterranean Roman office, JT Cornell also discovers proof that Alistair and Liz, and not Julian and Eve, are Chad Harris's parents. Furthermore, because Eve's mother adopted Liz, Chad and Whitney are only adoptive half-cousins, removing the stigma of incest from their relationship and allowing them to be together once more.

After his plots are revealed and foiled, Alistair focuses his energy on escaping Rome with Beth and Marty. Luis and Fancy pursue the three, and Alistair becomes so enraged by the aid that his beloved granddaughter lends Luis that he sets lions loose on the pair, forcing Fancy to accept her grandfather's true nature. Alistair then commandeers a train and flees the city with Beth and Marty; Luis, Fancy, and Noah are in pursuit in an Interpol helicopter when a drone plane fires missiles at a bridge, destroying it. The train then plunges into the ravine below, presumably killing Alistair, Beth, and Marty on July 17, 2006.

=== Return to Harmony, 2007–08 ===
Alistair is first glimpsed again on August 20, 2007, more than a year after his apparent death, in the mental institution housing his disturbed grandson, Vincent Clarkson; it is quickly revealed that Alistair warped Vincent's already fragile psyche and was behind Vincent's actions as Harmony's mysterious masked Blackmailer. Vincent tells Alistair of the secret that he learned — that Little Ethan was fathered by Ethan, not Julian — and Alistair is enraged that Theresa duped him. In revenge, Alistair sends poisoned strawberries to her honeymoon suite, but Ethan mistakenly eats them instead and falls into a coma. Theresa, along with Chad, Whitney, Rebecca, and Gwen, beg Alistair to allow them to dial 9-1-1, but he refuses, and he and Chad engage in a struggle for his gun; Alistair then shoots Chad in the chest, murdering his own son on August 28. Ethan eventually pulls through, but Alistair reminds Theresa that he is her legal husband and, fearful of being made a laughingstock for making a non-Crane his heir, threatens to harm her if she tells anyone about Little Ethan's paternity.

Alistair is also horrified to learn that his beloved Fancy is in a relationship with Luis. In order to break the couple up and return Fancy to her "old self", Alistair has a mind-control device implanted into his eldest granddaughter's nose; with a special remote controller, Alistair forces Fancy to violently lash out at Luis. Furthermore, he tells Luis that he must impregnate his other granddaughter, Pretty, if he ever wants to see Marty, who is revealed to be alive, again, driving another wedge between Luis and Fancy. When Luis and Fancy reunite, Alistair returns Marty to his mother and orders Sheridan to use the boy to create friction between her ex-fiancé and niece.

Meanwhile, Esme Vanderheusen, whose recent lovers, with the exception of Julian, have all been murdered by an unseen culprit, decides to use her "curse" to rid Harmony of Alistair. Alistair quickly realizes Esme's intentions, however; when he tries to rape her, he is stabbed in the back and sees that his assailant is none other than Esme's fifteen-year-old niece, Viki. Alistair is taken to the hospital and arrested for Chad's murder, but he refuses to name Viki as his attempted murderer, preferring to use the seemingly innocent young girl as an assassin; Viki's attempts to murder Ethan Winthrop, however, fail, and Alistair is sent to prison pending his trial.

In May 2008, Eve Russell is driven to the breaking point regarding Alistair's treatment of her son, Vincent, and decides to kill the Crane patriarch. However, Julian intervenes, seeking to prevent his love from a prison sentence and shoots his father at point blank range in the chest. Fatally wounded, Alistair moans for Eve's help, but the wound is too deep. As Alistair dies, Julian recalls all of his victims. Alistair's last words are to his son; "I gave you life; it's not fair that you should take mine". Alistair's death fulfills the prophecy of witch Tabitha Lenox that this is the first of the signs of the destruction of Harmony. As Julian was getting arrested it was revealed the gun he shot Alistair with was full of blanks and someone else killed him, not Julian. It was shown, to the audience only, Viki really shot him at the same time Julian did from afar.

== Personality ==
Fancy: I know how evil you really are. I've seen the pain you inflict on people.
Alistair: I had to be strong. I had to be strong for my family. I had to be strong for you.
Fancy: No, you use people as if they were pawns on your chessboard. You play games with their lives.
Alistair: Well, I'll tell you something, kid – life is a game! My rules, my game, and I'm in total control.

— Fancy and Alistair Crane, August 22, 2007

Alistair is frequently described by the other characters as being brilliant, yet ruthless and evil: Eve Russell claims that "Mentally, maybe [he was brilliant]. But emotionally he was demented, deranged. There was nothing evil that was beyond his capabilities." He is often portrayed as a larger-than-life force with surveillance cameras all over town, as well as in strategic locations around the world; an immense staff of henchmen ready to do his bidding; and control of a global, billion-dollar company.

Alistair is also very much a megalomaniac and a control freak; most of his actions are driven by a need to control his family members. For many years, he uses the threat of disinheritance to force Julian and Ethan to do his bidding and attempts to murder his own daughter, Sheridan, when she disobeys him and accepts Luis's proposal. Alistair's frequent use of rape, against his three main "romantic" interests – Rachel, Katherine, and Theresa – also indicates his love of power over his sexual partners.

Of all of his descendants, the only person that Alistair has ever loved is his eldest granddaughter, Fancy Crane. Believing her to be the only "true Crane" of all of his relatives and admiring her spirit and ability to stand up to him, Alistair served as a father figure to the young girl, who was largely ignored by her parents, and indulged and encouraged her nonchalant, fun-seeking attitude, telling her that she was born to "enjoy [herself and] have fun". It is not until Alistair turns on her and sets lions loose on her and Luis in Rome that Fancy finally sees the true Alistair. When Alistair is revealed to be alive in 2007, Fancy rebels against him, refusing to conform to his wishes and denying him control. Instead of marking her for death as he did to other descendants who had stood up to him, Alistair has a mind-control device implanted into Fancy's nose, seeking to regain "his" Fancy. The only other person he apparently loved was Rachel Barrett.

== Legacy ==
Alistair's position as the head of a multibillion-dollar corporation and the patriarch of one of the wealthiest families in the world has led the contents of Alistair's will to play significantly into several of the program's storylines. From 1999 to 2000, Julian, as Alistair's eldest child and only known son, is the heir apparent to the Crane empire. Alistair eventually grows disgusted by Julian's behavior, however, and disinherits Julian in favor of Julian's firstborn child and son, Ethan Crane, in 2000; after Ethan breaks his engagement to Gwen Hotchkiss in order to marry Theresa Lopez-Fitzgerald later that year, Alistair also disinherits Ethan, leaving the title of heir apparent up for grabs.

As of the series finale in August 2008, Alistair has ten living biological and adoptive descendants—children Julian Crane and Sheridan Lopez-Fitzgerald and grandchildren Vincent Clarkson, Fancy Crane, Pretty Crane, Miles Harris-Crane, Endora Lenox, James Boothe, and Marty Lopez-Fitzgerald. Vincent fakes his death in 2007, and, despite the fact that the tradition of primogeniture would make him, Alistair's eldest son's eldest son, the heir apparent, the fact that Vincent is African American, a hermaphrodite, and a confessed murderer, rapist, and arsonist (although these crimes were at Alistair's behest) would all likely persuade Alistair to bypass Vincent when selecting an heir. Race also prejudiced Alistair against Chad, and Alistair never seriously considers him, nor his son, Miles, as a possibility for heir. Furthermore, Julian is not publicly known to be Endora's father, though Alistair is aware of the girl's paternity and status as a half-witch, and it is therefore highly unlikely that Alistair has included her in his will.

Upon his October 2005 wedding to Theresa, Alistair disinherits all of his relatives—then including Julian, Sheridan, Beth, Chad, Fancy, Pretty, Fox, Endora, Marty, and Miles—aside from Julian and Theresa's son Little Ethan, whom he adopts, and makes Little Ethan his sole heir; his other descendants are only to receive money from their trust funds and from working at Crane Industries. A year later, Sheridan adopts a son, James, and it is assumed that James meets the same fate as his mother and is not included in Alistair's will.

Alistair's will becomes especially important once it is revealed that Little Ethan, whom Alistair adopted on the belief that he was a Crane, was fathered by Ethan Winthrop and not Julian. Should Little Ethan's paternity ever be made public, Alistair's will states that Fancy will become the sole Crane heir. However, only Alistair, Theresa, and Julian know of the will's special provisions. It is assumed that Julian becomes head of the Crane Empire with Fancy and her unborn child as heirs presumptive based on Julian's statements in the series finale.

== See also ==
- Crane family
- Lopez-Fitzgerald family
- Passions Vendetta
