= Show Us Your Wits =

- Starring: Daphnee Duplaix
- Country of origin: United States

Production
- Running time: 30 mins

Original release
- Network: Playboy TV
- Release: January 1 – March 14, 2009

Show Us Your Wits is a Playboy TV adult game show based out of the Las Vegas Palomino Strip Club and hosted by Daphnee Duplaix.

== Format ==
Touted as the first "strip club game show", Show Us Your Wits uses a similar format to the television show Cash Cab, whereas unsuspecting contestants have to answer rapid-fire questions for monetary compensation.

Rather than a taxi cab setting, these contestants enter a lap dance room at the Las Vegas Palomino Club, only to be surprised by former Playboy Playmate Daphnee Duplaix.

The men then have to answer her "guy-related" trivia questions (sports, pop culture, etc.) while getting a lap dance from a real girl from the club. Each correct answer garners a cash reward which they can then keep or utilize in the "Double Or Nothing" round.

The "Double Or Nothing" challenge gave the contestants more difficult questions and distractions from two nude strippers as opposed to one.
