= Minnesota Correctional Facility – Shakopee =

Prison in Minnesota, United States

Coordinates: 44°47′24″N 93°32′18″W

- Interactive map of Minnesota Correctional Facility – Shakopee
- Location: 1010 6th Ave W Shakopee, Minnesota
- Status: open
- Security class: mixed
- Capacity: 600
- Opened: 1986
- Managed by: Minnesota Department of Corrections
- Warden: Kathy Halvorson

The Minnesota Correctional Facility – Shakopee (MCF-SHK) is a women-only state prison in Minnesota, USA.

Constructed in 1986 and located in Shakopee, Scott County, it is Minnesota's only facility for housing female offenders.

MCF-SHK is home to 500+ women of all five custody levels. The Facility consists of ten buildings, including six inmate living areas (including a chemical dependency treatment unit, parenting unit and education unit), a mental health unit and a segregation facility, an industries building, and administration and engineering related buildings.

The prison previously had no perimeter fence or wall, only a hedge surrounding the property until 2016. This was after a bonding bill passed by the legislature of Minnesota in 2014 allowing for the erection of a twelve foot fence to surround the prison. Despite previously having no fence or wall only eight prisoners have been able to escape but all were later caught.

MCF-SHK is home to a chemical dependency treatment unit, a program that promotes and teaches good parenting skills, and was formerly home to a work-release style program for women. Cosmetology, office support classes, as well as several college courses are also offered to the women.

== Notable Inmates ==
- Khoua Her
- Colleen Larson
- Lois Riess
- Elizabeth Hawes
