= John Reilly (actor, born 1934) =

American actor (1934–2021)

- Born: November 11, 1934; Chicago, Illinois, U.S.
- Died: January 9, 2021 (aged 86)
- Other name: John D. Reilly
- Occupation: Actor
- Years active: 1965–2013
- Spouse: Liz Janred (m. 1981)
- Children: 5, including Caitlin

John Henry Matthew Reilly (November 11, 1934 – January 9, 2021) was an American film and television actor who appeared on soap operas, including General Hospital, Sunset Beach, and Passions.

== Career ==
Born in Chicago, Illinois, Reilly began acting in the mid-1960s with guest starring roles on Death Valley Days, Apple's Way and Gunsmoke. In 1974, he replaced John Colenback as Dr. Dan Stewart on As the World Turns. After a two and a half year run, he left As the World Turns in September 1976 and was replaced by his predecessor John Colenback. Airing March 12, 1977, he appeared on, The Mary Tyler Moore Show, in the episode, Lou Dates Mary. He also made two guest appearances on The Bionic Woman in 1977 and 1978, and had roles in the 1978 television movies Lassie: A New Beginning and Secrets of Three Hungry Wives. In addition to television, Reilly also appeared in feature films including The Main Event (1979) and Gorp (1980).

In 1983, Reilly had a recurring role on nighttime soap opera Dallas. The following year, he was cast as WSB agent Sean Donely on General Hospital. He stayed with the series until November 1994 when he opted not to renew his contract because of a pay-out from then-executive producer Wendy Riche. His character was written out of the show in February 1995, when Sean and his on screen wife Tiffany left town. He returned to daytime television as Del Douglas on Sunset Beach for a short-term guest role during the show's first six episodes, and then later returned on various occasions during 1997–1999.

Reilly played Kelly Taylor's oft-absentee father, Bill, in several episodes of Beverly Hills, 90210. The character left the canvas when Bill Taylor was arrested and sent to jail, following a reconciliation with his daughter.

On January 21, 2005, Reilly took over the role of Alistair Crane on the NBC soap opera Passions. He took over the role from David Bailey after Bailey died in a pool accident in November 2004. In July 2006, Reilly was dropped from the show as a result of budget cuts. He returned to the role in August 2007 as a recurring character and remained with the show until his character was killed off in May 2008.

On October 21, 2008, Reilly reprised the role of Sean Donely on General Hospital: Night Shift for the second-season finale. On August 9, 2013, Reilly reprised the role of Sean Donely on General Hospital for the 50th anniversary year.

== Personal life and death ==
Reilly married Lily-Beth "Liz" Janred (born 1947 in Halmstad, Sweden) in 1981. They had five daughters, including Caitlin, who is also an actress.

Reilly died on January 9, 2021, after living with Alzheimer's disease for many years. The cause of death was a heart attack.

== Filmography ==
=== Film ===
Year	Film	Role	Notes
1975	The Great Waldo Pepper	Western Star	
1983	Deal of the Century	Swain	
1985	Doin' Time	Governor	
1986	Touch and Go	Jerry Pepper	

=== Television ===
Year	Title	Role	Notes
1966	A Man Called Shenandoah	Jamie Brewster Jr.	Season 6, episode 20 "The Long Way Home"
1974–1976	As the World Turns	Dan Stewart	Regular cast member
1976	Kojak	Special Prosecutor Whelan	1 episode
1977	The Mary Tyler Moore Show	Jake	1 episode
1977	Barnaby Jones	Steve Crandall	1 episode
1978	Hawaii Five-O	Kelly Trahune	1 episode
1978	Wonder Woman	Skye	1 episode
1978	The Bionic Woman	Sam Sloan, Hober	2 episodes: "Long Live The King", "Escape To Love"
1979	A Man Called Sloane	David Clarke	1 episode
1980	The Incredible Hulk	Steve	1 episode
1980	The Love Boat	Bill Simmons	1 episode
1981	Quincy, M.E.	Ship's Security Chief Flannery	2 episodes
1982	Madame's Place	Max St. James	1 episode
1982	The Powers of Matthew Star	Dr. Simon Bernard	1 episode
1982	Hart to Hart	Billingsley	Season 4 episode “A Christmas Hart”
1982–1983	Silver Spoons	Bob Danish	2 episodes
1983	Remington Steele	Russell Stewart	1 episode
1983	Tales of the Gold Monkey	Truman Hastings	1 episode
1983	Three's Company	Dr. Malcolm Kenderson	1 episode
1984	Simon & Simon	Brian Harms	1 episode
1984	Benson	Augie Marathon	season 6, episode 1 "The Scandal"
1984	Cover Up	Alex Kendall	1 episode
1984	Cagney & Lacey	Jeremy Mitchell	1 episode
1984	Dallas	Roy Ralston	6 episodes
1984	Paper Dolls	Jake Larner	3 episodes
1984	Newhart	Professor David Cameron	1 episode
1984–1995, 2013	General Hospital	Sean Donely	Contract Cast Player
1994–1995	Empty Nest	Adam Blakely	2 episodes
1994–1996	Iron Man	Hawkeye/Clint Barton, Abner Jenkins/Beetle	Voice, 19 episodes
1995	Maybe This Time	Flint	1 episode
1996	Mr. & Mrs. Smith	Elway Johnson	1 episode
1996	Diagnosis: Murder	Preston Michaels	1 episode
1997	Pacific Palisades	Preston Bentley	1 episode
1997	The Naked Truth	King	1 episode
1997	Beverly Hills, 90210	Bill Taylor	Recurring
1997–1999	Sunset Beach	Del Douglas	Recurring
1998	Mortal Kombat: Conquest	Baron Reyland	3 episodes
1999	Melrose Place	Mack McBride	1 episode
2000	Son of the Beach	J.P Wynne	1 episode
2001	Days of Our Lives	Marquis of La Cienega	1 episode
2002	Judging Amy	Bill Hackett	1 episode
2003	She Spies	Karl Richmond	1 episode
2005–2006	Passions	Alistair Crane (#3)	Contract Cast Member
2007–2008	Passions	Alistair Crane (#3)	Recurring cast Member
2008	General Hospital: Night Shift	Sean Donely	Guest Star
2012	The Bay	Mortimer	4 episodes

=== Theme parks ===
Year	Title	Role	Notes
1989	Body Wars	Subject in pre-show (uncredited)	Disney attraction

== Awards nominations ==
Year	Award	Result	Category	Series
1986	Soap Opera Digest Awards	Nominated	Outstanding Actor in a Leading Role on a Daytime Serial	General Hospital
