= Britney vs Spears =

Britney Vs Spears
- Official poster
- Directed by: Erin Lee Carr
- Produced by: Erin Lee Carr; Kate Barry; Sarah Gibson
- Cinematography: Shane Sigler; Megan Stacey
- Edited by: Jason Sager; Tim K. Smith
- Music by: Leopold Ross; Ioanna Gika
- Production companies: Story Syndicate; Carr Lot Productions
- Distributed by: Netflix
- Release date: September 28, 2021
- Running time: 93 minutes
- Country: United States
- Language: English

Britney vs Spears is a 2021 American documentary film directed by Erin Lee Carr, that follows American singer-songwriter Britney Spears and her life over several years of her career and her conservatorship. It was released on September 28, 2021, on Netflix.

== Synopsis ==
The film follows Britney Spears' life over several years and her conservatorship.

== Production ==
Erin Lee Carr spent two years researching and investigating the Spears' conservatorship dispute. Carr had attempted to reach out to Britney Spears through her representatives, but did not receive a response, instead writing her a letter about the film. The film initially was supposed to revolve around the conservatorship and the media's treatment of her, but following the release of Framing Britney Spears, it changed the structure of the film.

In February 2021, it was announced Lee Carr would direct an untitled film about Spears, with Netflix set to distribute.

== Reception ==
On Rotten Tomatoes it has a 60% approval rating based on reviews from 15 critics, with an average rating of 4.20/10. On Metacritic, the film holds a rating of 41 out of 100, based on 12 critics, indicating "mixed or average" reviews.

Kristen Lopez for IndieWire gave the film a B− writing, "Erin Lee Carr’s Britney vs Spears feels like a movie not searching for scandal but a genuine desire to help, to say something to Spears, to remind us why we love her and how we failed her. It reminds us how a government system has failed her consistently for 13 years. It reminds us of how her family has failed her. Judy Berman of Time gave the film a positive review, writing: "The most thoughtful, stylishly composed of the three docs, it's framed by Carr and Eliscu’s collaborative quest to break the silence surrounding the conservatorship."

Conversely, Michael Cragg for The Guardian gave the film one star out of five, writing: "Certainly not in the pop star’s best interests, this disturbing film gives redemption stories to controversial figures from Britney’s past. Nothing about this feels right." Daniel D'Addario for Variety wrote: "This shapeless doc feels overlong at just over 90 minutes, because it's unclear what, exactly, Carr and collaborator Jenny Eliscu want to say about Spears." Jen Chaney of Vulture wrote: "a Netflix work that was originally intended to celebrate Britney unfortunately comes across as a bandwagon jump", referring to the documentary Framing Britney Spears that had premiered earlier that year. The Daily Beast and San Francisco Chronicle both described the film as "exploitive".
