= David Bailey (actor) =

American actor (1933–2004)

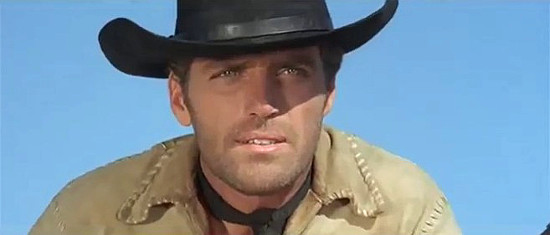
- David Bailey in Up the MacGregors! (1967)
- Born: October 27, 1933; Newark, New Jersey, U.S.
- Died: November 25, 2004 (aged 71); Los Angeles, California, U.S.
- Occupation: Actor
- Years active: 1964–2004
- Spouses: Barbara Johnson (1 child) Lois Clarney (1 child); Yvonne Jacoby (?–2004) (his death)

David Bailey (October 27, 1933 – November 25, 2004) was an American actor. Born in Newark, New Jersey, he went on to have a lengthy career in theater and television, perhaps his best known role being Dr. Russ Matthews on the long-running daytime soap Another World (1973–1981, 1989, 1992).

On November 25, 2004, Bailey drowned in the pool at his home in Los Angeles, California. He was 71 years old. His grave is located in Forest Lawn – Hollywood Hills Cemetery.

At the time of his death, he had been playing Alistair Crane on the daytime soap Passions for less than three months, to great fan and critical praise. After his death, the role was recast with soap actor John Reilly. The following year, Bailey's son Xander had a small role on Passions as Edmund, a man who dated Alistair's granddaughter, Fancy.

== Filmography ==
=== Film ===
Year	Title	Role	Notes
1967	Up the MacGregors!	Gregor Mac Gregor	
1969	Three		
1969	Change of Mind	Tommy Benson	
1973	Wicked, Wicked	Rick Stewart	
1990	In a Pig's Eye		
1994	Above the Rim	Rollins	
2001	The Believer	Judge	
2001	Never Again	Chad	
2001	Popcorn Shrimp		Short Film
2003	The Good Thief	Banion	
2006	Touched	George	Posthumous release

=== Television ===
Year	Title	Role	Notes
1964	The Bill Dana Show	Johnny	Episode: "Tonsils for Two"
1966	Hawk	Greg Meyers	Episode: "The Theory of the Innocent Bystander"
1966	McNab's Lab	Timmy McNab	TV movie
1969–1970	Where the Heart Is	Tony Monroe	
1971	Ironside	Richard Bonner	Episode: "Love, Peace, Brotherhood and Murder"
1971	Cannon	Bruce Conley	Episode: "Dead Pigeon"
1972	The New Temperatures Rising Show	David Amherst	Episode: "Operation Bingo"
1974–1989	Another World	Russ Matthews	60 episodes
1979–1993	Guiding Light	Doctor Polsey / Alan Spaulding	2 episodes
1988–1989	Ryan's Hope	Teddy Malcolm	
1986	The Equalizer	1st Suit	Episode: "Pretenders"
1988	Kate & Allie	Charlie Kincaid	Episode: "Inside Park Avenue"
1990	Working It Out	Phillip	Episode: "Who Asks First"
1992	All My Children	INS Interviewer	Episode: "Episode #1.5751"
1992–1999	Law & Order	Ned Cheron / 'Allan' Rohmer	2 episodes
1994	One Life to Live	Ed Bartowsky	
2004	Hack	Dr. Bellamy	Episode: "One for My Baby"
2004	Something the Lord Made	General John Cunningham	TV movie
2004–2005	Passions	Alistair Crane	31 episodes
2008	Treasure Keepers	Smith	TV movie; Posthumous release
