= Gus Wenner =

American magazine executive (born 1990)

- Born: August 10, 1990 (age 36)
- Education: Brown University
- Title: Founder and CEO, Wenner Media Ventures (2026-present)
- Partner: Elle Fanning (2023–present)
- Father: Jann Wenner

Gus Wenner (born August 10, 1990) is an American entrepreneur who is the founder and CEO of Wenner Media Ventures. He was formerly the chief executive officer of Rolling Stone, the magazine founded by his father, Jann Wenner.

== Early life and education ==
Wenner is the son of Jane Schindelheim and magazine magnate Jann Wenner, founder of Rolling Stone and co-founder of the Rock and Roll Hall of Fame. Wenner graduated from Brown University in 2012. While in college, he was one half of the duo "Gus+Scout," alongside Scout LaRue Willis, the daughter of Demi Moore and Bruce Willis.

== Career ==
Wenner joined Wenner Media shortly after his graduation from Brown University in 2012. He was in charge of digital aspects of RollingStone.com with site traffic climbing 40 percent during his tenure. In 2013, at the age of 23, Wenner became the head of digital for the online versions of Wenner Media's Rolling Stone, Us Weekly, and Men's Journal magazines. During his time as head of digital, he was credited with launching Rolling Stone's standalone country website and also oversaw the sale of the publication to Penske Media Corporation.

Wenner stayed on as the president and chief operating officer of Rolling Stone after its sale to Penske Media Corporation in 2017. He is also the executive producer for several documentaries, including SuperVillain The Making Of Takashi 6ix9ine. In 2021, he was promoted to chief executive officer at Rolling Stone. In May 2025, Rolling Stone announced that Wenner would transition into the role of executive chairman, with Julian Holguin taking over as CEO.

In 2026, he launched the investment firm Wenner Media Ventures, and indicated an initial investment in Track Star producer, Public Opinion, of which Wenner is to become executive chairman.

== Personal life ==
Wenner has been in a relationship with the actress Elle Fanning since 2023. The relationship was made public when they attended the 81st Golden Globe Awards together in January 2024.

== Filmography ==
Year	Film	Role
2025	Trophy Wife: Murder on Safari	Executive producer
2022	Little Richard: I Am Everything	Executive producer
2021	SuperVillain The Making Of Takashi 6ix9ine	Executive producer
2019	USA v Chapo	Executive producer
2015	Jackass Reunion: 15 Years Later	Executive producer
