= Free Network Foundation =

Defunct NGO

The Free Network Foundation was an American non-governmental organization active in the early 2010s. Its work focused on research and advocacy for wireless community networks. Its efforts to provide the Occupy movement with internet connectivity were the subject of the Motherboard documentary Free The Network.

== Operations ==
The Free Network Foundation was co-founded by Isaac Wilder and Charles Wyble. Wilder was 21 years old during the Occupy Wall Street protests of 2011, and was concerned about the centralization and control of physical Critical Internet infrastructure in the hands of a few Tier 1 networks.

In a Motherboard documentary Free The Network, Wilder went to jail for 36 hours during the Occupy movement and returned to find that his Free Network Foundation laptops and networking equipment had been smashed and destroyed by a garbage truck.

Following the clearing of Zuccotti Park, the Free Network Foundation moved its base of operations to Wilder's hometown of Kansas City, Missouri. There it aimed to provide an alternative to Google Fiber's inaugural network. Its commons-oriented approach to digital infrastructure has been cited as a model by numerous researchers and other organizations.
