= Track Star (web series) =

2023 American web series

- Genre: Quiz show
- Created by: Jack Coyne; Kieran Coyne; Henry Kornaros
- Presented by: Jack Coyne
- Country of origin: United States
- Original language: English

Production
- Production company: Public Opinion

Original release
- Network: TikTok
- Release: January 2023 – present

Track Star (often presented as Track Star*) is an American online video quiz show. Launched in 2023, it features man on the street interviews hosted in New York City by Jack Coyne, who offers contestants a double or nothing wager sequence based on whether they can identify the artists of chosen songs. Many of the guests are celebrities such as Ed Sheeran, Nile Rodgers, Charli XCX, the Haim sisters, Olivia Rodrigo, Jack Antonoff, Nelly Furtado, Oprah Winfrey, Halsey, Kings of Leon, Maggie Rogers, Camila Cabello, Paris Hilton, Sam Smith, Jimmy Fallon, Remi Wolf, Julia Louis-Dreyfus, Chloe Bailey, and Vice President Kamala Harris.

The show was created by Coyne, his brother and cinematographer Kieran Coyne, and Henry Kornaros of the media company Public Opinion. It launched on TikTok, where it has more than half a million followers, and has since spread to YouTube and Facebook.

The company started after Jack Coyne began working for YouTube personality Casey Neistat, who popularized the man on the street format on his channel. Public Opinion started with a trivia show about New York City, before launching Track Star. In 2024, they launched the mini-concert series Track Star Presents. In September 2025, the company launched The Track Star Podcast on YouTube.

In January 2026, Gus Wenner launched investment firm Wenner Media Ventures, and indicated its initial investment would be into Public Opinion, with Wenner becoming the production company's executive chairman.

== Format ==
In each episode, host Coyne stands by a contestant wearing Beats headphones and says, "If you can name the artist, you win five bucks.” He then plays a snippet of a song in a genre determined by the contestant, with the image of the single or album cover obscured for the viewer. If successful, the contestant will identify the artist, win five dollars, and then be asked to introduce themselves.

Thereafter the value of each song doubles, first to $10, then $20, and so on. The songs may get progressively harder along the way. Often, if the contestant is a celebrity, some songs may have a connection to the contestant, leading to dialogue about the music and the celebrity's career.

As of October 2025, the highest amount any contestant has won is $10,240.
