= Perfect Wife: The Mysterious Disappearance of Sherri Papini =

American true crime documentary series

- Genre: Documentary
- Directed by: Michael Beach Nichols
- Music by: Dan Deacon
- Country of origin: United States
- Original language: English
- No. of episodes: 3

Production
- Executive producers: Allison Berkley; Joseph Freed; Rob Ford; Erin Lee Carr
- Producers: Michael Beach Nichols; Christopher K. Walker; Colin Cosack
- Cinematography: Helki Frantzen
- Editors: Christopher K. Walker; Colin Cosack
- Running time: 52-61 minutes
- Production company: Marwar Junction Productions

Original release
- Network: Hulu
- Release: June 20, 2024

Perfect Wife: The Mysterious Disappearance of Sherri Papini is a 2024 American documentary series directed and produced by Michael Beach Nichols. It explores the Sherri Papini kidnapping hoax.

It premiered on June 20, 2024, on Hulu.

== Premise ==
The series follows Sherri and Keith Papini, who live an ordinary life until Sherri disappears, triggering a search that becomes news around the world.

== Episodes ==
No.	Title	Directed by	Original release date
1	"It's A Wonderful Life With You"	Michael Beach Nichols	June 20, 2024
2	"Smegma was Relentless"	Michael Beach Nichols	June 20, 2024
3	"You Never Found Me"	Michael Beach Nichols	June 20, 2024

== Production ==
Hulu ordered "Perfect Wife" from executive producers Allison Berkley and Joseph Freed of Marwar Junction Productions in 2023, as exclusively reported by Variety. Michael Beach Nichols was attached to direct and executive produce the series alongside Erin Lee Carr and Rob Ford.

== Release ==
The series premiered on Hulu June 20, 2024. It will make its broadcast premiere debut on ABC beginning on January 30, 2025.

== Reception ==
=== Critical reception ===
In December 2024, Rolling Stone named Perfect Wife one of their nine best true crime documentaries of the year.

The review aggregator website Rotten Tomatoes reported a 60% approval rating based on 5 critic reviews.

=== Viewership ===
During its first week of release, 3.6 million viewers tuned into the series, making it Hulu's most watched documentary series ever.
