= Trophy Wife: Murder on Safari =

2025 American documentary series

- Genre: Documentary
- Directed by: Dani Sloane
- Music by: Logan Nelson
- Country of origin: United States
- Original language: English
- No. of episodes: 3

Production
- Executive producers: Dani Sloane; Erin Lee Carr; Matthew Cherchio; Kathleen Flood; Justin Lacob; Bryn Mooser; Jason Fine; Gus Wenner; Alexandra Dale; Matt Sullivan; Claire Weinraub; David Sloan
- Producer: Kaley Roberts
- Running time: 41-43 minutes
- Production companies: ABC News Studios; XTR; Rolling Stone Films

Original release
- Network: Hulu
- Release: July 21, 2025

Trophy Wife: Murder on Safari is an American documentary series directed and produced by Dani Sloane. It explores the investigation into dentist Larry Rudolph following the October 2016 murder of his wife Bianca Rudolph in Zambia.

It premiered on July 21, 2025, on Hulu.

== Premise ==
Explores the investigation into dentist Larry Rudolph following the October 2016 death of his wife, Bianca, while on a safari in Zambia. Initially ruled an accident, suspicions in the United States rise, leading investigators to discover Rudolph's affair with dental hygienist Lori Milliron, as well as fraud. Rudolph is later convicted and sentenced to life in prison, while Milliron is later convicted as an accessory and sentenced to seventeen years in prison.

== Episodes ==
No.	Title	Directed by	Original release date
1	"Jekyll & Hyde"	Dani Sloane	July 21, 2025
2	"Something Fishy"	Dani Sloane	July 21, 2025
3	"Crocodile Tears"	Dani Sloane	July 21, 2025

== Production ==
The series is based upon the article "Before the Dentist Knows You’re Dead" in Rolling Stone by Matt Sullivan. Erin Lee Carr serves as an executive producer, while ABC News Studios co-produces with XTR and Rolling Stone Films.
