= Phillip Jeanmarie =

American actor (born 1978)

- Born: Phillip Kitsing Jeanmarie; October 6, 1978 (age 47); Los Angeles, California
- Occupation: Actor
- Years active: 2000–present
- Spouse: Joy Bisco

Phillip Kitsing Jeanmarie (born October 6, 1978) is an American actor best known for portraying Max Cooper, the Blue Shark Ranger in Power Rangers Wild Force and as intersex villain Vincent Clarkson—son of Julian Crane and Eve Russell—on the daytime soap opera Passions from December 2006 to the series finale in 2008.

== Filmography ==
=== Film ===
- Never Land (2000) - Lost Boy #1
- Slip (2006) - Parnell
- For the Best (2006) - G.D - Son
- For Reel (2008)
- One Missed Call (2008)
- (Un)Still Life (2008)

=== Television ===
- CSI: Crime Scene Investigation (2000) - Valet
- Power Rangers Wild Force (2002) - Max Cooper / Blue Shark Wild Force Ranger
- ER (2003) - Patient
- Clubhouse (2004) - Chuck
- Commander in Chief (2005) - Student at Debate
- Everwood (2005) - Pete Boroni
- Cold Case (2005) - Cedric Bubley
- Passions (December 2006 – July 2008) - Vincent Clarkson
- Crossing Jordan (2007) - Darryl Bellamy
- Workshop (Web series, Summer 2009-2011) - Adam Saltair

=== Video games ===
- Grand Theft Auto: San Andreas (2004) - Pedestrian (voice)
