= Russell family (Passions) =

Fictional family from an American soap opera

From left, Eve, Simone, Whitney, and T. C. Russell

The Russell family is a fictional family depicted on the American soap opera Passions, which aired on NBC (1999–2007) and later on DirecTV (2007–2008). The family was created by the soap's founder and head writer James E. Reilly; it originally consisted of four characters—the married couple Eve and T. C. Russell, and their children Whitney and Simone. The Russells are one of the four core families in the fictional town of Harmony, and are characterized by their friendship with the Bennetts and Lopez-Fitzgeralds and their feud with the Cranes.

As the series progressed, four more characters were added to the family: Eve's vengeful, adoptive sister Liz Sanbourne; Eve's child with Julian Crane, Vincent Clarkson; Whitney's husband and Liz's son, Chad Harris-Crane; and Eve's aunt Irma Johnson. Most of the characters left during the show's transition from NBC to DirecTV, leaving Eve and Vincent as the only representatives of the Russell family in the series finale.

The characters initially received negative feedback for their representation of an African-American family. They were praised by cast members, but Rodney Van Johnson, who played T. C., felt they were not used to their full potential. Despite the criticism, the cast was frequently nominated for NAACP Image Awards and featured prominently in a series of public service announcements for Black History Month in 2003. The Russell family also drew media and critical attention for storylines involving various LGBTQ topics: Chad Harris-Crane's affair with Vincent and subsequent confusion about his sexual orientation, Simone's coming out as lesbian to her family, and the revelation that Vincent was intersex. While the show's treatment of sexual and gender identity has received mixed feedback from critics, Passions won the award for Outstanding Daily Drama at the 17th GLAAD Media Awards.

== Creation and development ==
Character	Actor(s)
Core family members
Eve Russell	Tracey Ross
T. C. Russell	Rodney Van Johnson
Simone Russell	Lena Cardwell; Chrystee Pharris; Cathy Jenéen Doe
Whitney Russell	Brook Kerr
Vincent Clarkson	Phillip Jeanmarie; Daphnée Duplaix
Extended family
Chad Harris-Crane	Donn Swaby; Charles Divins
Liz Sanbourne	Amelia Marshall
Irma Johnson	Marla Gibbs

Along with the Bennetts, the Cranes, and the Lopez-Fitzgeralds, the Russells are one of four core families conceived by series creator James E. Reilly. They have featured prominently on the soap opera since its premiere on July 5, 1999. Sheraton Kalouria, senior vice president of NBC's daytime programming, said the decision to create and cast two minority families—the African-American Russells and the Hispanic Lopez-Fitzgeralds—was a conscious effort to simulate the diversity of the United States, and that the cast reflected the show's "truly color-blind storytelling". Rodney Van Johnson, who played T. C. Russell, expressed an appreciation for the show's representation of "a full African-American family" that was involved in serious stories on daytime television rather than "just a flash in the pan", and also said that the Russell family received a considerable response from African-American viewers. An article in Jet described each member of the Russell family as having an "integral part [in] the show" rather than appearing as token characters.

Other Passions' cast members agreed that the Russells were not portrayed as racial stereotypes; Tracey Ross said her character Eve is "just a person" and is not purely defined by her race, and Charles Divins, who played Chad Harris-Crane, said the show's treatment of the Russells as "a strong African American family" was "refreshing". Amelia Marshall, who portrayed Liz Sanbourne, felt that the creation of seven African-American roles allowed each character to be unique:

It's an awful lot of fun to be going to all these dark and extreme places. I finally realized that there are seven African-Americans on this show and I don't have to be the flag-bearer for African-Americans. I can just be an actress given a crazy bitch to play and play it to the best of my ability. I don't have to say, 'I don't want to represent my people like that.' We'll let the Eve character be upstanding, even though she's got shades. It's so much fun to just deal with acting the part and not deal with the politics of it.

During the soap opera's final years, Johnson expressed disappointment when the show began "taking out the people of color", such as Amelia Marshall, Brook Kerr (who played Whitney Russell), and himself; he also said it was an obvious sign that "this thing is going down." Johnson identified racial diversity as one of the show's biggest draws, but added that the African-American actors were not used to their full potential. Following the departures of Johnson, Kerr, and Cathy Jenéen Doe (Simone) in 2007 the Russells' only representatives in the series finale were Tracey Ross (Eve) and Phillip Jeanmarie (Vincent).

== Core family members ==
=== Eve Russell ===
Eve Russell is the matriarch of the Russell family and a respected doctor at Harmony Hospital. Her early storylines focus on her attempts to keep her past alcohol and drug abuse, and her relationship and child with Julian Crane, secret from her family and the rest of Harmony. Following the revelation of her past, she was characterized mainly through the rekindling of her romance with Julian and her tense relationship with their son Vincent Clarkson. Ross described Eve as "a contradiction inside an enigma". She based her performance on Catherine Halsey from Ayn Rand's 1943 novel The Fountainhead, and Eve White from the 1957 film The Three Faces of Eve.

Eve was played by Tracey Ross for the entire run of the series. Actresses Amanda Maiden and Kimberly Kevon Williams portrayed Eve in 2003 during flashbacks. A writer from Jet praised Ross's depiction of Eve for broadening the representation of African-American characters on television. Ross's portrayal of the character was warmly received by viewers, who frequently rated her their favorite Passions actress in Soap Opera Digest polls. Eve and Julian's relationship was also seen positively by fans, who referred to the couple as "Evian". TV Guide listed Eve and Julian as one of the best soap-opera supercouples, praising the chemistry between Ross and co-star Ben Masters, Soap Opera Weekly referred to the pairing as "the Odd Couple of Passions".

=== T. C. Russell ===
T. C. Russell is the patriarch of the Russell family. He is characterized by his violent temper and hatred of Julian Crane for supposedly injuring him in a hit-and-run attack, and destroying his chances of becoming a professional tennis player. T. C. is initially portrayed as a harsh and unforgiving parent; he pushes Whitney to train to be a tennis champion, as he once wanted to be, and disapproves of her relationship with Chad Harris-Crane, feeling it is a distraction. He is also violent with Simone when she reveals she is a lesbian. After learning about Eve's past relationship with Julian and her responsibility for the car crash that ended his tennis career, T. C. files for divorce and has a brief romance and engagement to her adoptive sister Liz Sanbourne. The show humanizes T. C. and softens his temper during his recovery from a stroke; his final storylines focus on his attempts to rebuild his relationship with his ex-wife and children. In 2007, he moves to New Orleans to help Whitney with her pregnancy and reconnect with Simone. T. C. does not appear in the show after its transition to DirecTV, and he is neither seen nor mentioned in the series finale.

T. C. was portrayed by Rodney Van Johnson from July 5, 1999, to June 19, 2007; Johnson was dropped to recurring status in December 2006 before his last appearance in June 2007. On March 19, 2001, Jerry Gaona played the character in flashbacks. Once T. C. was developed beyond the role of "the angry black man" and it became clear that the contents of his secret shed were not important to the plot, Johnson felt that his presence in the show was dramatically reduced. After being reduced to the status of a recurring cast member, he expressed doubt that he would return to the show in its final episodes. T. C.'s relationship with Eve, and Johnson's chemistry with Ross, did not receive much attention from the fans or the media. Other Passions cast members and representatives commented on the preference for Julian over T. C.; Masters said his character Julian should "just kick T. C. out of his house" and beat him with a 4x4, and a spokesperson from the show pushed Julian and Eve's romance to the forefront as "a new supercouple in Harmony" without any mention of T. C. Internationally, T. C. received a more positive response. African newspaper Mmegi said Johnson was invited to the 2005 Miss Culture and Heritage contest in Botswana due to his performance of T. C. as a "husband and father in the soap that warms the hearts of many in different countries".

=== Simone Russell ===
Simone Russell is the youngest daughter of Eve and T. C. Russell, and is initially always seen in her older sister's shadow. She is first introduced as a part of a love triangle with Whitney and Chad, and an accomplice in Kay Bennett's schemes to seduce Miguel Lopez-Fitzgerald. Simone receives more prominence after she announces she is a lesbian and begins a relationship with Rae Thomas. T. C. beats her after hearing about her relationship with Rae, but after much resistance, her family eventually supports her sexual identity. After learning Vincent killed Rae, Simone decides to leave Harmony with her sister to help her with her pregnancy, and to settle in New Orleans. Simone does not physically appear on screen after the show moved from NBC to DirecTV, but she is referenced through her letter to Kay before Kay's marriage to Miguel.

Over the course of the show, Simone was played by three actresses: Lena Cardwell (July 5, 1999, to April 16, 2001), Chrystee Pharris (April 17, 2001, to April 2004), and Cathy Jenéen Doe (July 23, 2004, to September 4, 2007). The program made history as the first daytime serial to show two women having sex in bed. She is also the first African-American lesbian character to appear in a daytime serial. When discussing the decision to portray Simone as a lesbian, Kalouria emphasized "sexual identity isn't a passing fancy" and "this is where [Simone] is [...] I can assure you we're not going to make light of this particular topic." The storyline about Simone's lesbianism, and the representation of her sexuality, received mixed feedback from critics and media outlets, as did Cathy Jenéen Doe's performance. Sarah Warn, former editor of entertainment website AfterEllen.com, criticized the lesbian reveal as having "reduced Simone to a one-dimensional character who happened to sleep with a girl".

=== Whitney Russell ===
Whitney Russell is the eldest daughter of Eve and T. C. Russell. She is introduced as a close friend of Theresa Lopez-Fitzgerald Crane, but she became prominent on the show as the love interest of Chad Harris-Crane. When Chad is incorrectly identified as Eve and Julian's son, his relationship with Whitney is judged to be incestuous. Whitney's confusion about her relationship with Chad, and her shame at possibly committing incest, escalates after she becomes pregnant and gives birth to their son, Miles Harris-Crane. Whitney briefly becomes estranged from Chad and Harmony, and becomes a nun to absolve herself of the sin of incest. The discovery of Chad's birth certificate proves the couple are not blood relatives; they resume their relationship and eventually marry. Whitney leaves Chad after discovering his affair with Vincent Clarkson. Their later reconciliation is cut short when he is murdered by Alistair Crane. Following Chad's death, Whitney moves to New Orleans to raise Miles, and her unborn child, with the help of Simone. Whitney does not appear on screen after the show moved from NBC to DirecTV, but she is referenced in a telephone call to police chief Sam Bennett and Simone's letter to her best friend Kay Bennett.

Whitney was portrayed by Brook Kerr from the series' debut on July 5, 1999, to September 7, 2007. In 2005, Sidne Siobhan Phillips portrayed the character in flashbacks. Passions' casting director Jacklynn Briskey originally rejected 26-year-old Brook Kerr for the role of Whitney, believing she would look too mature to play a teenager. Despite this decision, Kerr's husband Christopher Warren submitted his wife's head shots to the network and she was hired to play the character. Kerr later described the week of auditioning and two screen tests to be formally cast in the role as an extremely quick process. While discussing her portrayal of the character, Kerr said, "I was always the sensible one, the friend everyone could count on, always doing what I should." Over the course of the series, media outlets frequently speculated on the exact nature of Whitney's relationship with Chad. The incest storyline led media outlets to sensationalize Harmony as the place where "half-siblings sleep with one another". Soap Opera Digest listed the 2006 revelation that Whitney and Chad were not related by blood as one of Passions' most shocking secrets.

=== Vincent Clarkson ===
Vincent Clarkson, also known as Valerie Davis, is Eve and Julian's child; he is later revealed to be the blackmailer and serial rapist of the show's 2007 summertime extravaganza. In the show's final episode on NBC, Vincent is revealed to be intersex and Valerie Davis is shown to be his alter ego. After the program moved to DirecTV, Vincent's storylines focused on his plan to torment Eve out of revenge for failing to prevent his abduction at birth, his sexual relationship with Julian, and his pregnancy with his father's child. Vincent teams up with Viki Chatsworth to kill the main characters at the rehearsal dinner for a mass marriage of four of the show's couples. Vincent and Viki are arrested after Tabitha Lenox sacrifices her magic to revive everyone.

Vincent was portrayed by Phillip Jeanmarie from December 26, 2006, to July 18, 2008; Valerie Davis was played by Daphnée Duplaix from December 16, 2004, to May 28, 2008, and temporarily by Siena Goines from January 30 to April 3, 2007. The character received mixed reactions from the show's cast and television critics. Jeanmarie described Vincent as representing the way in which Passions "pushed the boundaries and limits of what other soap operas didn't dare to do". On the other hand, Tracey Ross said the storyline of Vincent giving birth to his father's child made her "physically nauseous" and she could complete the delivery scenes only after the show's acting coach Maria O'Brien convinced her of "the comedic possibilities". Jamey Giddens of Daytime Confidential felt that Jeanmarie deserved an Emmy for making Vincent's outlandish situations believable. Josh Robertson of Complex called Duplaix, who had been a Playboy Playmate, one of the most successful soap actresses for her performances as Valerie in 34 episodes of Passions, along with her portrayal of Rachel Gannon in 95 episodes of One Life to Live. Herndon L. Davis of Windy City Times criticized the show's representation of Vincent's sexual relationship with Chad as "a down-low storyline which involved an African-American man but eventually turned it into an outrageous intersex serial killer storyline."

== Extended family ==
=== Chad Harris-Crane ===
Chad Harris-Crane is the main love interest and later husband of Whitney Russell; he is also the father of Miles Davis Harris-Crane and another child. Chad's early appearances focus on his search for his biological parents, and his love triangle with sisters Whitney and Simone. Chad is initially believed to be Eve and Julian's child, which would make his relationship with Whitney incestuous. Chad's birth certificate later proves he was conceived when Alistair Crane raped Eve's adoptive sister Liz Sanbourne. He reunites with Whitney without the stigma of incest. During his separation from Whitney, Chad initiates a sexual relationship with Vincent Clarkson and continues it after his marriage. He is unaware he is committing incest because he is Vincent's half-uncle, adoptive half-cousin, and half-brother-in-law. After catching Chad having sex with Vincent, Whitney files for divorce; they later begin to reconcile through helping Theresa Lopez-Fitzgerald and Ethan Winthrop reunite as a couple. Their potential reconciliation is cut short when Chad is murdered by Alistair.

Chad was portrayed by two actors over the course of the show: Donn Swaby (1999 to 2002) and Charles Divins (2002 to 2007). Despite the controversy, and negative reception of Chad's sexual encounters with Vincent, Divins noted "the characters and their relationship [are] important aspects of the show." To prepare for the storyline, Divins consulted with his gay friends, and watched Oprah Winfrey's discussion of the down-low on her talk show The Oprah Winfrey Show. Divins praised the show for its inclusion of a black, gay character on daytime television, while Swaby was disappointed by the direction Chad's storyline took. The character was a subject of parody on E!'s weekly television series The Soup, in which host Joel McHale turned a scene in which Chad insisted he was "not gay" despite his affair with Vincent into a running gag by referring to the character as "Not Gay Chad". Divins—the principal actor to play Chad during the storylines focusing on the character's sexuality—made a cameo appearance on The Soup's season five premiere.

=== Liz Sanbourne ===
Marla Gibbs (left) and Amelia Marshall

Liz Sanbourne is the antagonist and foil to her adoptive sister Eve Russell. Initially identified only by her first name, Liz is first seen as the owner of a resort on the fictional St. Lisa's Island, located near Bermuda and the Bermuda Triangle. Liz is still in love with her former boyfriend Brian O'Leary. Her early appearances center on her attempts to reunite amnesiac Sheridan Crane with Luis Lopez-Fitzgerald, despite Brian's interest in her. When Liz arrives in Harmony, it is revealed that she is Eve's half-sister, and is later retconned to become her adoptive sister. Liz exposes Eve's past relationship with Julian Crane, inadvertently leading them to reunite and proving Chad Harris-Crane and Whitney Russell were not committing incest by her identification as Chad's mother. Liz harbors a deep desire for revenge against Eve for unknowingly abandoning her in an abusive household. Liz also seeks vengeance against the Crane family after she was raped by Alistair, and later forced to undergo surgery that made her barren. Liz leaves the show in February 2006, abandoning her vengeance against Eve, Julian, and Alistair to find a new life for herself.

Liz was portrayed by actress Amelia Marshall from October 3, 2001, to February 17, 2006. In 2003, Arreale Davis and Taquel Graves played the character in flashbacks. Amelia Marshall was hired for the role because of her past work with James E. Reilly on Guiding Light. Marshall described her opinion of Passions prior to being approached with the role: "... there were always these strange things happening on the show. It really pulls you in." She has commented that her decision to take on the role of Liz came from wanting to play characters that were different from her past appearances as Belinda Keffers in All My Children, and Gilly Grant Speakes in Guiding Light. In an interview with Soap Talk, Marshall said, "I just love the fact that he saw me and realized that I could be such a witch." An article on Metacritic noted that Marshall was removed due to changes in the show's budget.

=== Irma Johnson ===
Irma Johnson is the sister of the late Warren Johnson and Eve Russell's aunt. When she was young, Eve had a close relationship with her aunt because of their love of gospel music. Irma is proud of Eve's singing in the church's choir; she discouraged Eve from singing jazz and blues music, calling them sinful. Their relationship became strained when Irma saw a drugged and intoxicated Eve singing in a seedy Boston jazz club and cavorting with several men. Irma disowns Eve when she discovers her relationship with Julian, who is white, and her pregnancy with his child. Eve and Irma did not speak for nearly 20 years. Eve paid for Irma to live in a retirement home, but told everyone she had no living relatives in an attempt to keep her past secret.

In 2004, Eve's vengeful, adoptive sister, Liz Sanbourne, discovers Irma's existence, and brings her to Harmony to destroy Eve's life by revealing her past to her family. Irma tells them Eve was once a prostitute and drug addict while living in Boston, and was involved in a relationship with Julian, who is T. C.'s sworn enemy. The revelations destroy Eve and T. C.'s marriage. Despite her Christian upbringing, Irma is often foul-mouthed; she frequently calls Eve a whore or a slut. When Eve's daughter Simone tells Irma she is a lesbian, Irma, who has previously been kind to her, tells Simone homosexuality is vile and disgusting, and orders her to leave and never return. Irma was portrayed by actress Marla Gibbs on a recurring basis in 2004 and 2005. Gibbs viewed Irma as a malicious character, and was surprised at fans' positive feedback.

== Usage in other media ==
The Russell family received further attention when the actors participated in public service announcements (PSAs) to celebrate the achievements of African-Americans in commemoration of Black History Month. The PSAs ran on NBC stations throughout February 2003. Tracey Ross and Rodney Van Johnson made cameo appearances as Eve and T. C. Russell in the series finale of the NBC primetime drama Providence, marking one of the first crossovers between daytime and primetime television.

Members of the Russell family were featured in Hidden Passions, a 2001 tie-in novel promoted as Tabitha Lenox's journal exposing the town's secrets sent into HarperCollins by her magical doll Timmy Lenox. The book documents Eve's past drug abuse, relationship with Julian Crane, and the kidnapping of her son Vincent Clarkson. It also covers T. C.'s accident and his first meeting and courtship with Eve.

Following DirecTV's decision to not renew the show, Passions partnered with Premiere Props to hold a public two-day estate sale of props and costumes from the show. Stacey Ward, a director of NBCUniversal, pitched the auction as "an opportunity to own a piece of their favorite show". Several items related to the Russell family were offered for sale, including Vincent's disguise as the "Blackmailer" (without the mask) and Eve's medical coat splattered with blood from her botched surgery on Julian.

== Reception ==
=== Critical reception ===
The show initially received mostly negative reviews for its lack of focus on the Russells in comparison to the other three core families. Reviewing the soap opera's first weeks, television critic Hal Boedeker of the Orlando Sentinel criticized the show for relegating the Russell family to "spend[ing] most of their time listening to the problems of the white Bennetts" and questioned its attempt at "racial progress". The Russells were described as having received less screen time than other characters by The Baltimore Sun's Tamara Ikenberg, who commented that the series appeared to revolve around three families as opposed to four. Ken Tucker of Entertainment Weekly felt the Russells only served to represent the fact that "Harmony also seems to contain exactly one black family." In contrast, David Alexander Nahmod of the Bay Area Reporter praised the show for "present[ing] an almost utopian picture of racial harmony in the town of Harmony" by not showing racial inequality or strife. Despite the focus on an African-American family, Lynette Rice of Entertainment Weekly said the show failed to attract the "hard-to-reach audience [of] African-American women"; Sheraton Kalouria said, "quite frankly, many of them aren't aware Passions is even on."

=== Accolades ===
Passions received two Daytime Drama awards at the American Scene Awards. These awards were given to recognize the diversity in the show's cast, which was praised for "ensuring diversity in casting and storylines from the very beginning" and "exemplifi[ng] the richness of the American scene on daytime television". Passions was the only soap opera to win the award twice in a row. Kerr was nominated for Outstanding Younger Lead Actress, and, along with co-stars Lindsay Hartley and Justin Hartley, was nominated for Favorite Triangle at the 2005 Soap Opera Digest Awards. Doe was listed as a pre-nominee for the Daytime Emmy Award for Outstanding Supporting Actress in a Drama Series for the 34th Daytime Emmy Awards alongside co-star Emily Harper, but was not chosen as one of the final nominees. Passions won the award for Outstanding Daily Drama at the 17th GLAAD Media Awards, with Doe accepting the award on the show's behalf.

The actors were also frequently nominated for NAACP Image Awards. Ross received eight nominations for the NAACP Image Award for Outstanding Actress in a Daytime Drama Series and won the award at the 38th NAACP Image Awards for her portrayal of Eve. Ross has cited Eve as expanding the TV representation of African-Americans and interracial relationships. For her performance as Whitney, Kerr was nominated for the NAACP Image Award for Outstanding Actress in a Daytime Drama Series at the 39th NAACP Image Awards. Gibbs received positive feedback for her performance as Irma; she earned a nomination for the NAACP Image Award for Outstanding Actress in a Daytime Drama Series at the 37th NAACP Image Awards.

== See also ==
- List of Passions characters
- List of soap operas with LGBT characters
