= Liz Sanbourne =

Fictional character in Passions

- Passions character
- Amelia Marshall as Liz Sanbourne
- Portrayed by: Amelia Marshall; Arreale Davis (2003 flashback); Taquel Graves (2003 flashback)
- Duration: 2001–06
- First appearance: October 3, 2001
- Last appearance: February 17, 2006
- Created by: James E. Reilly
In-universe information
- Other names: Elizabeth Sanbourne
- Occupation: Blue Note owner (former); Hotel resort owner (former)
- Adoptive mother: Ruby Lincoln
- Half-sisters: Eve Russell (adoptive)
- Sons: Chad Harris-Crane
- Grandchildren: Miles Harris-Crane; Diana Harris-Crane
- Aunts: Irma Johnson (adoptive)
- Nieces and nephews: Vincent Clarkson (adoptive); Whitney Russell (adoptive); Simone Russell (adoptive)

Liz Sanbourne is a fictional character from the American soap opera Passions, which aired on National Broadcasting Company (NBC) from 1999 to 2007 and on DirecTV from 2007 to 2008. Created by the soap's head writer, James E. Reilly, Liz was portrayed by Amelia Marshall from October 3, 2001, to February 17, 2006. Arreale Davis and Taquel Graves also played the character in flashbacks in 2003. Reilly approached Marshall about the role after they worked together on Guiding Light; Marshall was attracted to the series due to the opportunity to play a darker and more complex character than her previous experiences. Her casting was part of NBC's attempt to include a racially diverse ensemble on daytime television.

Liz, part of Passions' Russell family, is introduced as a resort owner involved in the love triangle between Sheridan Crane and Antonio Lopez-Fitzgerald and his brother Luis Lopez-Fitzgerald. She gains more prominence on the series as the antagonist and foil to her adoptive sister Eve Russell. Liz's desperation to expose her sister's past relationship—and child—with Julian Crane leads to the breakup of the latter's marriage and family. Later storylines focus on her relationship with Eve's husband T. C. Russell and attempts to murder Alistair Crane for raping her as a teenager. Liz eventually abandons her vendetta against Eve and Alistair in order to find love in the future. Following her exit from the series, Liz is identified as the biological mother of Chad Harris-Crane, which proves his relationship with Whitney Russell is not incestuous.

Liz has been widely praised by television critics, specifically for her role as a villain. Marshall received a nomination for Soap Opera Digest Award for Outstanding Villainess in a Drama Series – Daytime in the 2005 Soap Opera Digest Awards, but lost to Jane Elliot for her portrayal of General Hospital's Tracy Quartermaine. Co-stars Tracey Ross and Rodney Van Johnson praised Marshall's performance on the series, but they were disappointed at her removal. Marshall's departure was the result of significant cuts in the soap opera's budget.

== Background ==
=== Creation and casting ===
Passions' creator and head writer James E. Reilly had approached Amelia Marshall about the role of Liz Sanbourne after they worked together on Guiding Light. Marshall said that she was attracted to the character since it was different from her previous performances as Belinda Keffers in All My Children, and Gilly Grant Speakes in Guiding Light. While discussiong her professional relationship with Reilly in an interview with Soap Talk, she had commented: "I just love the fact that he saw me and realized that I could be such a witch." Prior to receiving the role, Marshall was already aware of the soap opera's supernatural elements, and said the following about Passions: "... there were always these strange things happening on the show. It really pulls you in." Marshall portrayed Liz from October 3, 2001, until February 17, 2006. In 2003, Arreale Davis and Taquel Graves had played the character in flashbacks.

Sheraton Kalouria, senior vice president of National Broadcasting Company (NBC)'s daytime programming, described the show's use of color-blind casting as part of an effort to build a diverse pool of characters that best reflected ethnic and racial groups in the United States. Kalouria believed the show was set apart from other soap operas, by including "the African American Russells and the Hispanic Lopez-Fitzgeralds". In an interview with Soap Opera Digest, Marshall said Kalouria has led the effort: "to making sure the African-American community knows they are telling tales with African-American actors."

=== Characterization and relationships ===
"It's an awful lot of fun to be going to all these dark and extreme places. I finally realized that there are seven African-Americans on this show and I don't have to be the flag-bearer for African-Americans. I can just be an actress given a crazy bitch to play and play it to the best of my ability. I don't have to say, 'I don't want to represent my people like that.' We'll let the Eve character be upstanding, even though she's got shades. It's so much fun to just deal with acting the part and not deal with the politics of it."

— Marhsall discussing the show's racial diversity and its impact on her character

Marshall attributed her background as a dancer as giving her the discipline and direction to prepare for her character. She described the show as "so on the edge all the time", explaining that the storylines "ground[ed] [her] and the freedom from the dance world [...] g[ave] [her] the freedom to just soar with it." For the character's early appearances on Passions, Marshall characterized Liz as "milquetoast" and lacking any edge. She viewed Liz as a "very strong, centered woman who has had some hard knocks and challenge", and felt she was "wise beyond her years" and terrified of being left alone.

Early in the show, Marshall commented that Liz's relationship with former lover Antonio Lopez-Fitzgerald was not defined by the differences in the characters' races. She viewed the soap opera as a "breath of fresh air" due to this approach rather than handling it differently in regards to its interracial aspect. Echoing Marshall's sentiment, Tracey Ross, who portrays Liz's adoptive sister Eve Russell, identified social class as the biggest obstacle for relationships on Passions rather than race.

Over the course of the series, Marshall attempted to reconcile Liz's psychotic behavior with her approach to playing the character. Due to the lack of concrete information on her character's past at the outset, Marshall formulated different storylines for Liz that "allow[ed] [her] the freedom to go for what [she] s[aw] as Liz's level of anger and betrayal." Describing the role as an improvement over the girl next door characters she had previously played, she interpreted Liz's "unhealed pain and anger", primarily her inability to reconcile with her adoptive sister, as interesting acting challenges. She attributed Liz's behavior in the 2005 episodes to the character "operat[ing] even crazier than she normally does", describing her mental unraveling as a fun story arc to perform.

Marshall based her understanding of Liz on the character's relationship with Eve, which served as the primary focus for her character development and story arcs. Liz was initially not included in the show's descriptions of Eve's past. In the 2001 tie-in novel Hidden Passions: Secrets from the Diaries of Tabitha Lenox, Eve is characterized as the only child of "too-busy Harvard history Professor Warren Johnson and journalist Tanya Lincoln Johnson". Marshall felt Liz was irredeemable for her actions against Eve and her love interest Julian Crane. Interpreting the character as having a form of mental illness due to her repeated sexual abuse, Marshall said that "[e]very emotion she has it twisted". Ross added to Marshall's commentary by recommending that Liz should get "some serious electroshock therapy". Marshall found Liz's rivalry with Eve to be absurd, particularly a scene in which they fight in the Crane mansion. She went on to praise her working relationship with Ross, saying: "[i]t's a gift as an actor to have a good relationship with your scene partner when you're always the aggressor because you can go where you need to go and not be afraid."

=== Removal ===
Following Liz's exit in 2006, media outlets began to question the exact nature of Marshall's departure from the show. Commentators believed that the decision to remove several of the series' main characters was influenced by the slashing of the budget by "a reported $4-to-$5 million" to secure its renewal. Even though Passions representatives clarified the budget cuts were limited to a reduction in the production team, sets, and extras, television critics connected the departures of certain actors to the show's financial restraints. According to Metacritic, Marshall was fired due to the cuts in budget. TV Guide's soap opera columnist, Daniel R. Coleridge was critical of Liz's exit, writing that it prevented fans from "enjoy[ing] the pleasure of watching [her] digest all of that explosive info and act upon it."

== Storylines ==
=== Backstory ===
Liz Sanbourne is the adopted daughter of Mr. Sanbourne and Ruby Lincoln and the adoptive sister of Eve Russell, who is Ruby's daughter from a previous marriage. Eve and Liz are both unaware of the adoption, believing that they were half-sisters. Mr. Sanbourne repeatedly molested Liz after Eve left home and became a nightclub singer and a prostitute and started a relationship with businessman Julian Crane. Liz blamed Eve for abandoning her to her father's sexual abuse. When she was fourteen, Liz went to Boston in search of Eve. She tracked down Julian at a jazz club to talk to him about her sister and their relationship. Later that night, Alistair Crane, Julian's father, raped Liz in his son's apartment; Julian was passed out in a drunken stupor in the same room and was unaware of what happened. The rape resulted in Liz's pregnancy with Chad Harris-Crane, who was later believed to be Eve and Julian's son; Liz gave up her baby for adoption at birth, and was forced to undergo surgery that left her barren.

=== 2001–2006: Passions ===
Liz first appears in the episode airing on October 3, 2001, as the owner of the unnamed resort on the fictional island of St. Lisa's, located near Bermuda and the Bermuda Triangle. She helps her former boyfriend Brian O'Leary rescue Sheridan Crane following the explosion of her boat. Along with Brian, and their friend Doc, Liz becomes close with the amnesiac Sheridan while trying to help her to remember her past. Sheridan believes her name is Diana due to confusing memories of her friendship with Diana, Princess of Wales with her own; she begins a romantic relationship with Brian. Liz grows increasingly jealous of the attention Brian pays to Diana and suspicious of Brian's true identity. Liz forms a close friendship with Luis Lopez-Fitzgerald after he comes to the island to pick up a boat for his then girlfriend Beth Wallace. She thinks Luis is Diana's fiancée, but fails to reunite them, despite several attempts, before he returns home. Liz joins Diana and Brian to sail the ship back to the fictional town of Harmony. Upon returning to Harmony on Christmas Eve, Brian reveals his identity as Antonio Lopez-Fitzgerald, the long lost brother of Luis, and Liz and Diana convince him to reunite with his family. Liz again attempts to reunite Diana with Luis, but fails to do so before they return to St. Lisa's Island.

In 2002, Liz returns to Harmony in response to a telephone call from Diana; she tells Liz about her true identity as Sheridan, her engagement to Luis, and Antonio's terminal illness. While visiting Antonio in the hospital, Liz is startled and angry to find Eve in Harmony. She plots to reveal Eve's past to her husband T. C. Russell and her children Whitney and Simone Russell in order to replace her sister as the head of her family. Between 2002 and 2004, Liz makes bolder moves to expose Eve and coerce T. C. to have sex with her. In 2003, Liz buys the Blue Note, a jazz club Julian constructed as a copy of the place where he first met Eve, as a cover to stay in Harmony longer without raising suspicion. The storyline culminates in July 2004 when Liz brings Eve's aunt Irma Johnson to tell T. C. the truth about Eve's past relationship with Julian and their child. The characters also find out that Eve, not Julian, was responsible for the car accident ending T. C.'s tennis career. In retaliation, Eve tells everyone in Harmony about Liz's true identity as her sister. T. C. later divorces Eve after finding himself unable to forgive her for lying about her past. Following the signing of the divorce papers, he openly begins a romantic relationship with Liz.

In 2005, Liz drinks poisoned punch which Julian's ex-wife Rebecca Hotchkiss had intended for Eve. Liz accuses Eve of deliberately giving her the punch, and Eve is arrested for attempted murder. T. C. proposes to Liz, but she becomes increasingly paranoid over his romantic feelings for Eve. Liz attempts to force Julian to have sex with her in the middle of an earthquake and tsunami, and stabs him in the back when he does not comply. At this point, Liz lies to Julian by saying that he had raped her in the past. T. C. later breaks off his engagement with Liz after reconciling with his ex-wife's past and rebukes all of her efforts to seduce her way back into his life. On the eve of Eve's trial, Liz offers her adoptive sister a deal: she will rescind her accusation and not testify if Eve promises to leave Harmony forever. Eve considers the deal before ultimately refusing it. Near the end of Eve's trial, Julian agrees to give Rebecca anything she wants in exchange for her testimony that she saw Liz with the vial of poison. Tabitha Lenox's daughter Endora Lenox magically casts the jury into a fake flashback, matching Rebecca's testimony, and the judge declares a mistrial.

Liz's desperation to destroy Eve, Julian, and Alistair drives her to act more violent and erratic, such as threatening to kill Julian with a letter opener. At the New Year's Eve party, titled "A Murder is Announced", Liz stabs Alistair in the neck, which puts him into a coma. Before attempting to disconnect Alistair's life support, Liz confesses to Julian that she was the one who shot him in 2002. She tells Julian that he did not rape her, and that it was actually Alistair. Julian stops Liz from killing Alistair by encouraging her to let go of her hatred in order to find love in the future. She agrees to abandon her plans for revenge against Eve and Alistair in order to find a new direction for her life and leaves Harmony. In his comatose state, Alistair swears revenge against Liz. While in Rome, Italy, Chad discovers that Liz is his mother through his birth certificate provided by tabloid editor J. T. Cornell. The birth certificate also reveals that Liz was not Eve's half-sister, and Chad's relationship with Whitney was not incestuous.

== Reception ==
=== Critical response ===
Liz Sanbourne has been widely praised by television critics. The reveal that "the hard-working, kind-hearted hotel owner" Liz was Eve's sister was cited as one of Passions' biggest twists by a writer from Soap Opera Digest, who described the moment as "a slap-filled reunion". Liz's constant attempts to seek revenge against her adoptive sister was included as a highlight on Soap.com's Lori Wilson's overview of the high points of Eve's story arcs. Prior to the reveal of her true identity, Candace Havens of The Free Lance-Star felt that Liz would be a fan favorite character. Havens praised Liz as a woman with "well-rounded views and good sense of humor", pointing to her attempts to reunite the then supercouple Sheridan Crane and Luis Lopez-Fitzgerald as one of her appealing characteristics.

Critical response to Liz's characterization as a villain was largely positive. The character was praised as "deliciously devious" by Linda Marshall-Smith of Soapdom.com, and described as a "naughty diva" by Sister 2 Sister's Jamie Foster Brown. Marshall received a nomination for Soap Opera Digest Award for Outstanding Villainess in a Drama Series – Daytime in the 2005 Soap Opera Digest Awards, but lost to Jane Elliot for her portrayal of General Hospital's Tracy Quartermaine.

=== Cast response ===
Marshall's performance received a positive response from Passions' cast members. Ross felt that Marshall had the most demanding role on the soap opera, and commended her ability to make "Liz want[ing] to have sex in the middle of the tsunami" look believable. During the filming of the show, she said that she watched Marshall to take notes on how to improve her own acting.

Marshall's exit was the subject of criticism. In an interview with Soap Opera Digest, Ross criticized the decision to remove Marshall, and said, "When you're an actress of her caliber and kind to everyone and plan Christmas parties and celebrate everyone's birthday and know your lines and are the most darling girl that ever breathed, of course you're going to be fired!" Rodney Van Johnson, who portrayed T. C. Russell, said that he was disappointed when the show began removing its racially diverse actors, feeling that it was a sign of its imminent cancellation.
