= Eve Russell =

Character on the soap opera Passions

- Passions character
- Tracey Ross as Eve Russell
- Portrayed by: Tracey Ross; Amanda Maiden (2003 flashback); Kimberly Kevon Williams (2003 flashback)
- Duration: 1999–2008
- First appearance: July 5, 1999
- Last appearance: August 7, 2008
- Created by: James E. Reilly
- Introduced by: Lisa de Cazotte
- Book appearances: Hidden Passions: Secrets from the Diaries of Tabitha Lenox
- Crossover appearances: Providence
In-universe information
- Other names: Eve Johnson
- Occupation: Doctor; Medical examiner; Coroner; Hypnotherapist; Singer; Call girl
- Half-sisters: Liz Sanbourne (adoptive)
- Spouse: T.C. Russell (until 2004)
- Children: Vincent Clarkson; Whitney Russell; Simone Russell
- Grandchildren: JJ Crane; Miles Harris-Crane; Diana Harris-Crane
- Aunts: Irma Johnson
- Nephews: Chad Harris-Crane (adoptive)

Eve Russell is a fictional character on the American soap opera Passions, which aired on NBC from 1999 to 2007 and on DirecTV from 2007 to 2008. Created by the soap's head writer, James E. Reilly, Eve was played by Tracey Ross for the series' entire run. In 2003, actresses Amanda Maiden and Kimberly Kevon Williams played the character in flashbacks to her childhood and her time as a nightclub singer. Ross was initially hesitant to audition for the role following her negative experience on Ryan's Hope, but was attracted to the show after learning about its supernatural and fantasy elements. Her casting was part of NBC's attempt to include a racially diverse ensemble on daytime television. She based her performance on Joanne Woodward's role in the 1957 film The Three Faces of Eve and Catherine Halsey from Ayn Rand's 1943 novel, The Fountainhead.

Eve, part of Passions' Russell family, is introduced as the perfect wife of T. C. Russell and mother of Whitney and Simone. Eve's desperation to conceal all evidence of her past relationship—and child—with Julian Crane leads to the breakup of her marriage and family, especially when her adoptive sister Liz Sanbourne arrives in the fictional Northeastern town of Harmony and ruins Eve's life for abandoning her first family. Later storylines focus on Eve's on-again, off-again relationship with Julian, and her search for their son, who is revealed as Vincent Clarkson despite long-running speculation by the show's characters and media outlets that he was Chad Harris-Crane. Ross and Johnson made cameo appearances as Eve and T. C. in the series finale of the NBC primetime drama Providence. At the end of the show, several props and costumes related to Eve were sold in an auction, along with other items from the show.

Critics and fans praised Ross' performance, although the character's later storylines were criticized by the cast. Eve and Julian, known by fans as "Evian", were dubbed "the Odd Couple of Passions" by Soap Opera Weekly, and critics reacted positively to the actors' chemistry. Ross felt that Eve's relationship with Julian showcased an authentic representation of an interracial couple. She received eight nominations for the NAACP Image Award for Outstanding Actress in a Daytime Drama Series, winning at the 38th NAACP Image Awards.

== Development ==
=== Casting and creation ===
Tracey Ross was originally hesitant to audition for another soap opera after her stint as Diana Douglas on Ryan's Hope from 1985 to 1987, which she compared to "working in a morgue" because the show was constantly threatened with cancellation. She initially rejected the offer to play Eve Russell, but she was repeatedly contacted by NBC about the role over several months before her agent convinced her to audition for Passions' casting director Jackie Briskey. Ross said later that she did not realize that Passions was supposed to be "wacky" until the character Grace Bennett floated out of her bedroom window. Based on the first week's scripts, she described Passions as "my kind of show" owing to the supernatural and fantasy elements. Ross played the role from the series debut on July 5, 1999, to its finale on August 7, 2008. In 2003, actresses Amanda Maiden and Kimberly Kevon Williams played the character in flashbacks to her childhood and her time as a nightclub singer. Ross described Passions as the opposite of Ryan's Hope; Passions, she felt, was "the spring of a soap opera" because of the cast and crew's excitement about future storylines, while Ryan's Hope was "the winter of one" due to the fear of cancellation.

Sheraton Kalouria, senior vice president of NBC's daytime programming, said that the show's racially diverse ensemble, as represented by the African American Russells and the Hispanic Lopez-Fitzgeralds, exemplified "truly color-blind storytelling". Ross believed that Eve was not defined by identity as an African American: "If they wanted to make my character any other ethnicity they wouldn't have to change a thing about her... She's just a person." The actress cited the show's racial diversity as a primary reason for her attraction to the role. She stated that she felt "tremendous support from NBC and Passions that the black characters and/or Hispanic characters are all essential parts of the story". She has cited Eve as helping to expand the TV representation of African Americans and interracial relationships.

=== Characterization and influences ===
The soap opera's official website stated that Eve was the "beautiful and compassionate town doctor" who was enjoying a successful career; she was described as an altruist by John Berlau of The Atlas Society. Ross initially saw the character as easy to play, calling her "everyone's best friend, and the town doctor, and a great mother". The actress had a more difficult time when Eve began behaving in morally questionable ways to protect secrets about her past. She felt that the change in Eve's character made the role challenging on an emotional level, comparing the experience to "getting a jail sentence and you're expected to go along with it without any explanation" or "the gods messing with somebody with no reason but to mess with them". When asked to describe Eve in three words, Ross responded that she was a "contradiction inside an enigma". Playing Eve, she said, was "as if somebody came and told you that your closest friend is doing abominable things". Ross appreciated Eve's characterization as a human being who was not portrayed as completely good or bad and had admirable qualities as well as faults. She later connected Eve's shame of her past life with Julian and inability to tell her family to Lavinia Kingsley's regrets about her youth in the 2002 comedy film The Banger Sisters.

In an interview with The Atlas Society, Ross related that her approach to Eve was inspired by Ayn Rand's objectivist philosophy. She said that Eve was "always willing to make sacrifices, and there's always somebody willing, as Ayn Rand said, to take any sacrifices you might be willing to make." She compared Eve to Catherine Halsey in Rand's 1943 novel, The Fountainhead, particularly around the middle of the novel, before Catherine "was completely destroyed". Ross described Eve as "a self-sacrificing animal", and emphasized that her character was distinct from her own self-identification as an individualist. Ross said that her portrayal of Eve was also influenced by Eve White, a character with dissociative identity disorder played by Joanne Woodward in the 1957 film The Three Faces of Eve. The actress researched books on sociopaths and psychopaths to help her approach Eve's desire to hide her past at any cost. During the filming process, she kept a diary to help her better understand how to approach future scenes. Ross also used the 2001 novel Hidden Passions: Secrets from the Diaries of Tabitha Lenox to inform her interpretation of Eve's past. She was surprised Eve's relationship with Julian was a "real short courtship" that turned her character from "the innocent girl to the woman on the Studio 54 dance floor having sex". After adjusting her perception of Eve's past, Ross chose to play the character's descent into drugs and prostitution as "more immediate, wild[,] and impulsive" and "very untamed and unrestrained".

=== Relationships ===
Early in the show, the actress based her understanding of Eve on the character's relationships with Grace and Ivy Winthrop. Ross described Eve's love for Grace as "my rock in the sea" when Eve took extreme, illegal measures to hide her past. Kim Johnston Ulrich, who portrayed Ivy, felt that her character viewed Eve as her only friend. Ross added that Eve respected Ivy's "ability to take charge" instead of "always tiptoeing around and walking on eggshells". She understood Ivy's schemes to blackmail Eve as an attempt at a deeper connection; as "the closest thing to a friend that Ivy had", Eve interpreted their relationship as a desire for friendship.

Ross described Eve's relationship with Julian Crane as an authentic representation of an interracial couple. She felt Eve was written as a fully realized person with her own story, rather than as a "walking, living philosophical statement" about race relations. Ross praised "the people who laid the groundwork for [her]" and allowed characters to be played other than "in a minstrel-like way", similar to Ellen DeGeneres paving the way for Will & Grace. Ross and Amelia Marshall, who played Eve's adoptive sister Liz Sanbourne, believed that the relationship emphasized a difference in social classes rather than races. Initially, Ross felt intimidated by playing a part of a supercouple, saying "[i]t means so much to me that I want to do it justice", but following the show's cancelation, she identified it as her favorite storyline. She went on to equate the Julian and Eve's love story to that of Romeo and Juliet. "My Baby's Gone", a song that Eve frequently performs on the show during flashbacks, was used to symbolize Eve's relationship with Julian. Ross recorded the vocals for it, as well as four other songs, without the aid of Auto-Tune. Passions was Ross' first singing role. When asked by a fan about her experiences singing on the show, Ross said she worked with a vocal coach, and described her sound as "sincere, soft, [and] non-grating".

== Appearances ==
=== 2001: Hidden Passions: Secrets from the Diaries of Tabitha Lenox ===
Hidden Passions: Secrets from the Diaries of Tabitha Lenox identifies Eve Russell as the only child of "too-busy Harvard history Professor Warren Johnson and journalist Tanya Lincoln Johnson". The series changed Eve's family, identifying her parents as Warren Johnson and Ruby Lincoln (a poor couple from the American South) and introducing Mr. Sanbourne as her stepfather and Liz Sanbourne as her adoptive sister. As a teenager, Eve runs away to Boston to pursue a career as a jazz singer; there, she meets Julian Crane and becomes involved with alcohol, drugs and prostitution. She also becomes close friends with fellow jazz singer Crystal Harris. During this period, she accidentally hits her future husband T. C. Russell while driving under the influence, ruining his tennis career. T. C., unaware that Eve is responsible for the accident, believes that Julian was driving. Eve and Julian separate after she learns that she is pregnant; Julian's marriage to the daughter of former Governor Harrison Winthrop, Ivy, is arranged by his father Alistair. Crystal, the only person Eve tells about her pregnancy, helps deliver her son.

Although Eve initially believes that her baby died, she learns that he survived when she discovers Vincent Clarkson in 2007. Hidden Passions identifies Vincent as born on Christmas Day. The book states that Alistair arranged for Vincent's death, but the hitman Jack placed the baby into social services without Alistair's knowledge. The series changed Alistair's involvement in Vincent's life; instead, Alistair abuses and manipulates Vincent as a tool for his plans to maintain power over Harmony. For most of the series, Eve and Julian's child is believed to be Chad Harris-Crane, who is later shown to be Liz's child from her rape by Alistair. After the apparent death of her child, Eve leaves Boston and gives up music to attend medical school. Alistair sends her money (which she uses to pay her tuition) to keep quiet about her relationship—and child—with Julian. Eve eventually moves to Harmony and becomes a respected physician at Harmony Hospital. She marries T. C. and has two children, Whitney and Simone.

=== 1999–2008: Passions ===
Eve's early storylines focus on her attempt to keep her past hidden from her family and her neighbors in Harmony. Ivy Winthrop unearths proof of Eve's relationship with Julian, and blackmails her into breaking up Grace Bennett's marriage with Sam Bennett. In 2002, Liz arrives in Harmony to seek revenge on her sister, who left her in an abusive household, but Eve keeps Liz's identity as her adoptive sister a secret from her family and the town. In a 2002–2004 storyline, Eve relies more on Julian as Liz attempts to expose her and seduce her husband. Eve works with Julian to find their child. Overwhelmed by Liz's desire for vengeance and the search for her child, Eve is unaware of Whitney's relationship with Chad. The storyline culminates in July 2004, when Liz brings Eve's aunt Irma Johnson to tell T. C. the truth about her relationship with Julian and their child. Whitney turns against her mother, incorrectly assuming that her child with Julian is Chad (making her relationship with him incestuous). T. C. divorces Eve, unable to forgive her lies about her past with Julian and her pregnancy, and begins a romantic relationship with Liz. Eve and Julian renew their relationship, despite his wife Rebecca Hotchkiss' refusal to grant him a divorce.

In 2005, Liz drinks poisoned punch which Rebecca had intended for Eve. Liz accuses Eve of deliberately giving her the punch, and Eve is arrested for attempted murder. During the arrest and trial, Eve and Julian grow closer together and T. C. ends his relationship with Liz to reconcile with his ex-wife. Julian makes a deal with Rebecca that he would give her anything she wants in exchange for her testimony that she saw Liz with the vial of poison; the judge declares a mistrial. The plot then focuses on Eve's love triangle with T. C. and Julian as she is torn between taking care of T. C. after his stroke and accepting Julian's proposal of marriage. Eve discovers Julian's affair with Valerie Davis, an employee of Crane Industries, leading to her decision to nurse T. C. back to health and renew their relationship to reunite their family. Julian later explains to Eve that he was paying Valerie to search for their son; Eve forgives Valerie, and she and Julian continue their search. In 2007, Eve and Julian discover that Vincent Clarkson (a blackmailer who raped and murdered several people) is their son, and try to support him despite his criminal past. However, Eve cannot accept her son's criminality and incestuous, adulterous affair with Chad Harris-Crane (Vincent's uncle, adoptive cousin and brother-in-law) and begins abusing drugs and alcohol. Her career and reputation suffer, and she has a breakdown after Vincent's apparent death on August 30, 2007. In the show's final NBC episode on September 7, 2007, Vincent is revealed as intersex; he separates his identity into Vincent and Valerie, an indication of dissociative identity disorder.

After the show's transition from NBC to DirecTV, Eve's storylines emphasize her romance with Julian and difficult relationship with Vincent. Believed dead, Vincent reveals himself, his gender identity and his pregnancy to Eve after seducing Julian (his father) and threatens to kill her if she tells anyone. In late 2007, he begins tormenting Eve out of revenge for her failure to prevent his abduction when he was born. Julian checks Eve into rehab after she relapses, abusing drugs and alcohol to cope with Vincent's frequent appearances. Vincent arranges for Eve's release from rehab to help him prepare for the impending birth. Vincent's psychopathic accomplice, Viki Chatsworth, later repeatedly stabs Julian in the groin and severs his penis. Vincent plies Eve with drugs and alcohol so she botches her attempt to surgically reattach Julian's penis; she reattaches it upside-down, and an erection might kill him. In May 2008, Eve and Julian assist Vincent with the birth of his son on the Russells' kitchen table, when Eve explains everything about Vincent and Valerie to Julian. Eve plans to form a relationship again with Vincent (believing that motherhood has mellowed him), and convinces Julian not to turn him in to the police. During the rehearsal for the joint weddings of Luis Lopez-Fitzgerald and Fancy Crane, Noah Bennett and Paloma Lopez-Fitzgerald, Miguel Lopez-Fitzgerald and Kay Bennett, and Edna Wallace and Norma Bates, Eve assures Julian that they love each other emotionally and intellectually; Julian vows that the Crane family will take more responsibility for their actions now that Alistair is dead. At the rehearsal dinner, Eve and the other dinner guests eat Vincent and Viki's poisoned mushroom sauce. She dies, but is resurrected when witch Tabitha Lenox renounces magic and becomes a born-again Christian. In the series finale, Kay uses her magic to heal Julian's penis. Since T. C., Whitney, and Simone moved to New Orleans in 2007, Eve and Vincent are the only two Russells in the final episode.

=== Other appearances and merchandise ===
Tracey Ross and Rodney Van Johnson made cameo appearances as Eve and T. C. Russell in the series finale of the NBC primetime drama, Providence, one of the first daytime-primetime crossovers. After DirecTV's decision to cancel the show, Passions joined Premiere Props in a public, two-day estate sale of props and costumes from the series. The auction gave fans "an opportunity to own a piece of their favorite show". Several Eve-related items were offered for sale, including a medical coat splattered with blood from her botched surgery on Julian and a framed copy of her medical degree.

== Reception ==
=== Cast response ===
Eve's character and storylines initially elicited a positive response from Passions' cast members. Johnson praised the show for its use of its African American characters like Eve. He appreciated the show's representation of "a full African American family" on daytime television with serious storylines, not "just a flash in the pan". According to Johnson, the Russell family was also well received by African American viewers. He said the chance to work with Tracey Ross, who he called the it girl for the African American community following her appearance on Star Search, influenced his acceptance of the role. Marshall commented on the absurdity of her character's rivalry with Eve, particularly their fight in the Crane mansion. She went on to praise Ross' acting, and said: "[i]t's a gift as an actor to have a good relationship with your scene partner when you're always the aggressor because you can go where you need to go and not be afraid."

Cast members were more critical of Eve's later appearances on the show. Ross reacted negatively to Eve's involvement in Vincent's storylines. She said that Vincent giving birth to his father's child made her "physically nauseous" and she could only complete the birth scenes after the show's acting coach, Maria O'Brien, convinced her of "[their] comedic possibilities". Eve's incorrect reattachment of Julian's penis was criticized by co-star McKenzie Westmore. Westmore cited it as a reason for the show's cancellation, saying, "This has got to be the worst storyline ever done, what are they doing?".

=== Critical reception ===
Eve Russell has been widely praised by television critics and viewers. Ross was frequently rated as fans' favorite Passions actress in Soap Opera Digest polls for her portrayal of the character. She was listed as number eight of the top-ten most beautiful soap actresses by TV Guide, who called her the show's most talented actress. At the time of his 2006 interview with Ross, Berlau identified Eve as one of the most popular characters on daytime television. Published in The Free Lance–Star's section requesting fans' story ideas for Passions, a viewer called the rivalry between Eve and Ivy the "best I've seen on daytime TV".

Critical response to Eve and Julian's relationship was largely positive. Eve and Julian were included in TV Guide's list of best soap opera supercouples due to the chemistry between Ross and Masters, and they were referenced as "the Odd Couple of Passions" by Soap Opera Weekly. Fans reacted positively to the characters' relationship, and dubbed the couple the portmanteau "Evian". According to Ross, the soap opera did not receive any negative criticism from its focus on an interracial couple. In an earlier interview with Soap Opera Weekly, Ross believed that neither the show's emphasis on Eve and Julian as a couple, nor a hypothetical situation in which she initiated a real-life relationship with Julian's actor, Ben Masters, would attract racist criticism. Despite the positive reception of the couple, Soapdom.com's Lesleyann Coker felt that the romance led to a regression in Julian's character. Coker argued that Eve turned Julian into a "harmless, gentle, lost soul", and preferred the times when Julian was a "drinking, cheating louse" instead.

The role of Eve earned Ross several award nominations, and she was praised for her representation of an African American character on daytime television. Ross received eight nominations for the NAACP Image Award for Outstanding Actress in a Daytime Drama Series and won at the 38th NAACP Image Awards. A writer from Jet described each member of the Russell family (including Eve) as being an "integral part of the show" rather than token characters.

== See also ==
- List of fictional doctors in television
