= Simone Russell =

Fictional character on Passions

- Passions character
- Cathy Jenéen Doe as Simone Russell
- Portrayed by: Lena Cardwell (1999–2001); Chrystee Pharris (2001–2004); Cathy Jenéen Doe (2004–2007)
- Duration: 1999–2007
- First appearance: July 5, 1999
- Last appearance: September 4, 2007
- Created by: James E. Reilly
- Introduced by: Lisa de Cazotte
In-universe information
- Occupation: Mark cosmetics employee; High school student
- Family: Russell
- Parents: TC Russell; Eve Russell
- Siblings: Whitney Russell; Vincent Clarkson
- Grandparents: Reggie Russell (deceased); Warren Johnson (deceased); Ruby Lincoln (deceased)
- Aunts and uncles: Liz Sanbourne (adoptive)
- Nieces and nephews: Miles Harris-Crane; Diana Harris-Crane; JJ Crane
- First cousins: Chad Harris-Crane (adoptive; deceased)
- Other relatives: Eve Johnson (great-grandmother; deceased); Irma Johnson (great-aunt)

Simone Russell is a fictional character on the American soap opera Passions, which aired on NBC from 1999 to 2007 and on DirecTV in 2007–08. A member of Passions' Russell family, Simone is introduced as the youngest daughter of Eve Russell and T. C. Russell, and the younger sister of Whitney Russell. Her early appearances center on her love triangle with Chad Harris-Crane and her sister Whitney; the character later gains more prominence on the show through her experience coming out as a lesbian to her family, and her relationship with Rae Thomas. The network defended the show's treatment of Simone's sexuality as a serious commentary on the topic.

Simone was created as a part of the show's effort to represent a complete African-American family and fully realized African-American characters on television. Conceived by the soap's founder and head writer James E. Reilly, the role was portrayed by three actresses over the course of the show: Lena Cardwell (1999–2001), Chrystee Pharris (2001–2004), and Cathy Jenéen Doe (2004–2007). The exact reasons behind Cardwell's departure remain unknown; Pharris chose to leave to pursue other acting opportunities. Doe was the third and final actress to play Simone before the character was written off the show shortly before its transition to DirecTV.

Simone's storyline made daytime television history when Passions became the first soap opera to show two women having sex. The character was also daytime television's first African-American lesbian. At the 17th GLAAD Media Awards, the show won Outstanding Daily Drama, and Doe accepted the award on the show's behalf. The show's representation of lesbian, gay, bisexual, and transgender (LGBT) topics, and Doe's performance as Simone, received a mixed response from critics; she was the principal actress during the storylines focusing on the character's sexuality.

== Development ==
=== Casting and creation ===
Sheraton Kalouria, senior vice president of NBC's daytime programming, described the show's color-blind casting as part of an effort to build a diverse pool of characters that best reflected the various ethnic and racial groups living in the United States. Kalouria believed the show stood apart from other soap operas by including the African-American Russell family and the Hispanic Lopez-Fitzgerald family.

Over the course of the show, Simone was played by three actresses: Lena Cardwell (July 5, 1999 to April 16, 2001), Chrystee Pharris (April 17, 2001 to April 2004), and Cathy Jenéen Doe (July 23, 2004 to September 4, 2007). After watching Cardwell's audition for the role, producers Reilly and Lisa de Cazotte considered Cardwell the ideal choice for Simone. NBC fired Cardwell in the winter of 2001, in a move described as "abrupt" in an article from Soapcentral. Cast members expressed disappointment at Cardwell's departure and the character's re-casting. Tracey Ross, who portrays Eve Russell, described Cardwell as being "very sincere, completely authentic and without malice" in her performance. Rodney Van Johnson, who plays T. C. Russell, viewed himself as "a father figure to her" and felt that their close relationship helped make the Russell family more authentic and relatable to viewers. After leaving the show, Cardwell said she received a great deal of fan mail and that the experience "made [her] feel loved and appreciated."

Pharris assumed the role in 2001, but later decided to not renew her contract in order to pursue other projects. During an interview with The Christian Post, she said that her time on Passions helped her to realize that her occupation as an actress could be used as a platform to advocate for Christianity. Doe was hired for the third and final re-casting after moving to Los Angeles from New York, where she was primarily offered the role of "a runaway teenager, a prostitute, a drug dealer". Initially hesitant to assume a character already established by other actors, she became friendly with Pharris, who answered all of her questions about the character.

=== Characterization ===
Simone was initially characterized by the show's official website through her "major crush on street-kid Chad Harris since he came to town". Daniel R. Coleridge of TV Guide described Simone's early behavior as "bitchy to her older sister, who was nothing but kind to her", while Variety's Josef referred to the character as a "daredevil teen." When assuming the role in 2001, Pharris said that her preparation consisted of consulting with her friends about Simone, Whitney, and Chad, and incorporating her own life experiences into her interpretation of the character. She commented that working closely with the producers allowed her to draw on her family background for her performance. While discussing the connection to her family, she stated that she used her father's temper as inspiration for playing Simone.

Simone was initially portrayed as one of the series' supporting characters, but gained more prominence during a storyline in which she comes out as a lesbian. Kalouria defended the show's treatment of the character's sexuality as a serious commentary on the topic. During an interview about the storyline, he highlighted "sexual identity isn't a passing fancy" and "this is where [Simone] is...I can assure you we're not going to make light of this particular topic." During the story arc involving her girlfriend Rae Thomas, Simone was noted for her naivety when approaching relationships and sex. Simone's sexuality is initially regarded as "a badge of shame" by the series' characters.

== Storylines ==
Introduced in the series premiere on July 5, 1999, Simone Russell is the youngest daughter of T. C. and Eve Russell, and the younger sister of Whitney Russell. The family lives in the fictional town of Harmony. Simone's early storylines concentrate on her reluctant participation in her friend Kay Bennett's schemes to separate Miguel Lopez-Fitzgerald from Charity Standish and her attraction to Chad-Harris Crane. Chad and Whitney hide their relationship from Simone to the point where Chad pretends to be Simone's boyfriend to keep her happy. After catching Chad and Whitney having sex, she ends the relationship with him and tells everyone in Harmony about his relationship with her sister. Disconnected from her sister, Simone becomes close friends with Kay's younger sister Jessica Bennett and Miguel's younger sister Paloma Lopez-Fitzgerald, and turns to them for support. Simone acts primarily in a supporting role for these two characters' storylines, for instance advising Jessica to divorce her abusive husband Spike Lester and seek professional help for her drug addiction. She briefly dates John Hastings, the son of David Hastings. At the time, John was mistakenly believed to be Grace Standish's son and the half-brother of Kay and Jessica. Simone's relationship with John ends in 2004 when he moves to Italy with David and Grace.

In mid-2005, Simone comes out as a lesbian by revealing to her family her relationship with Rae Thomas. The family reacts negatively to her sexual orientation. T. C. beats her and says he is ashamed to be her father. Eve panics and is concerned that her daughter's reputation will suffer if the rest of Harmony learns of her sexuality. Simone's great-aunt, Irma Johnson, describes homosexuality as a sin and calls her "vile" and "disgusting". Simone turns to her mother for emotional support after Rae rejects her declarations of love by revealing that she has no interest in a committed relationship. In December 2005, Eve, Julian, Liz, and T. C. find a video from Alistair Crane in which he claims to have hired Rae to seduce Simone and "turn" her into a lesbian. Rae later explains that the money is intended to start a lesbian club and that she was never hired to "turn" Simone gay. As she reconciles with Rae, Simone reconnects with her family. Her father, who recently suffered from a stroke following a car accident, apologizes for his homophobic behavior toward her. Her mother also becomes more supportive of her relationship.

Rae finds out Vincent Clarkson was framing Luis Lopez-Fitzgerald for his girlfriend Fancy Crane's rape. On February 12, 2007, Vincent stabs Rae to death before she can reveal his identity to Luis. Simone attempts to cope with Rae's death by helping Jessica through her pregnancy. She invites Jessica to live in Rae's old apartment so they can protect the baby from Spike. Eve, who was previously being blackmailed by Vincent, tells Simone the truth about Rae's murder. Simone leaves Harmony with her sister Whitney to start a new life in New Orleans. She does not appear during the show's run on DirecTV or in the series finale. In July 2008, Simone sends a letter to Kay congratulating her on her wedding to Miguel and includes a pair of earrings as the "something new".

== Reception and impact ==
"These stories have the ability to reach the many different generations of viewers who watch daytime and share with them stories of our lives. What viewers are seeing is that more and more of their own neighbors and friends are dealing with these issues, and the soaps are merely reflecting the reality of the world we live in."

— Damon Romine on the response to Simone's sexuality

Simone's storyline about coming out as a lesbian received mixed feedback. She was identified as "a character who broke down some barriers for the depiction of lesbians on daytime TV and earned the show awards and accolades from civil rights groups" by a writer from Soaps.com. The Atlantic's Aaron Foley saw the show's inclusion of a black, lesbian character as a sign of "America bec[oming] more comfortable with seeing blacks on screen" and viewers "bec[oming] more comfortable with risky, sometimes hilarious storylines". Damon Romine, media entertainment director of GLAAD (2005–2009), emphasized the show's ability to normalize lesbian, gay, bisexual, and transgender (LGBT) topics for a wider audience, and opined that the introduction of gay characters made soap operas worth watching. Simone's homosexuality was described as "the most real and moving story on the show" by Soapcentral's Brandi Pine, who found T. C.'s negative reaction to be a realistic portrayal of a parent's difficult in accepting his or her child's sexual orientation. Sarah Warn, former editor of entertainment website AfterEllen.com, considered the storyline an improvement over a similar one used in All My Children. Following the character's departure in 2007, Soaps.com identified Simone as a "charming and strong willed" character who would be remembered for "br[eaking] down some barriers for the depiction of lesbians on daytime TV".

Several television critics had a more negative response to Simone's storyline as a lesbian and to Doe's performance. Warn criticized Simone's relationship with Rae as poorly developed, believing her to be limited to "a one-dimensional character who happened to sleep with a girl", and argued that viewers never had the opportunity to "see this woman through her eyes" since the character's sexuality and past relationships with men, and her possible bisexuality, were never addressed on screen. Warn also derided the lack of chemistry between Doe and Jossara Jinaro, who plays Rae. Herndon L. Davis of Windy City Times felt the representation of Simone as daytime's first African-American lesbian was overshadowed by the show's poor portrayal of Vincent Clarkson. Davis discussed Simone's story arc in his wider criticism of race in daytime television. Rae's death following the reveal of Chad's affair with Vincent was heavily criticized by Mike Perigard of the Boston Herald, who believed that her removal was only written to maintain a low quota of gay characters on the show.

Simone was the first African-American lesbian to be featured on daytime television. Passions also made history by becoming the first daytime television series to show two women having sex. The soap opera won the award for Outstanding Daily Drama at the 17th GLAAD Media Awards, with Doe accepting the award on the show's behalf. Doe was also listed as a pre-nominee for the Daytime Emmy Award for Outstanding Supporting Actress in a Drama Series for the 34th Daytime Emmy Awards alongside co-star Emily Harper, but was not chosen as one of the final nominees.

== See also ==
- List of soap operas with LGBT characters
