= NAACP Image Award for Outstanding Actress in a Daytime Drama Series =

Former American television award

This article lists the winners and nominees for the NAACP Image Award for Outstanding Actress in a Daytime Drama Series. The award was given every year since the 1993 ceremony and later retired in 2015. Victoria Rowell holds the record for most wins in this category with 12.

== Winners and nominees ==
Winners are listed first and highlighted in bold.

=== 1990s ===
Year	Actress	Series	Network	Ref
1993
1993	**Victoria Rowell**	**The Young and the Restless**	**CBS**	
1994
1994	**Victoria Rowell**	**The Young and the Restless**	**CBS**	
1995
1995	**Victoria Rowell**	**The Young and the Restless**	**CBS**	
1996
1996	**Victoria Rowell**	**The Young and the Restless**	**CBS**	
1996	Rosalind Cash	General Hospital	ABC	
1996	Debbi Morgan	The City	ABC	
1996	Kelli Taylor	All My Children	ABC	
1996	Tonya Williams	The Young and the Restless	CBS	
1997
1997	**Victoria Rowell**	**The Young and the Restless**	**CBS**	
1997	Renée Jones	Days of Our Lives	NBC	
1997	Lynne Thigpen	All My Children	ABC	
1997	Leslie Uggams	All My Children	ABC	
1997	Tonya Williams	The Young and the Restless	CBS	
1998
1998	**Victoria Rowell**	**The Young and the Restless**	**CBS**	
1998	Senait Ashenafi	General Hospital	ABC	
1998	Renée Jones	Days of Our Lives	NBC	
1998	Amelia Marshall	All My Children	ABC	
1998	Tonya Williams	The Young and the Restless	CBS	
1999
1999	**Victoria Rowell**	**The Young and the Restless**	**CBS**	
1999	Amelia Marshall	All My Children	ABC	
1999	Lonette McKee	As the World Turns	CBS	
1999	Michelle Thomas	The Young and the Restless	CBS	
1999	Tonya Williams	The Young and the Restless	CBS	

=== 2000s ===
Year	Actress	Series	Network	Ref
2000
2000	**Tonya Williams**	**The Young and the Restless**	**CBS**	
2000	Siena Goines	The Young and the Restless	CBS	
2000	Renée Jones	Days of Our Lives	NBC	
2000	Amelia Marshall	All My Children	ABC	
2000	Tracey Ross	Passions	NBC	
2001
2001	**Victoria Rowell**	**The Young and the Restless**	**CBS**	
2001	Renée Jones	Days of Our Lives	NBC	
2001	Lynne Moody	General Hospital	ABC	
2001	Tracey Ross	Passions	NBC	
2001	Tonya Williams	The Young and the Restless	CBS	
2002
2002	**Tonya Williams**	**The Young and the Restless**	**CBS**	
2002	Renée Jones	Days of Our Lives	NBC	
2002	Marisa Ramirez	General Hospital	ABC	
2002	Alexia Robinson	The Young and the Restless	CBS	
2002	Tracey Ross	Passions	NBC	
2003
2003	**Victoria Rowell**	**The Young and the Restless**	**CBS**	
2003	Eva LaRue	All My Children	ABC	
2003	Tracey Ross	Passions	NBC	
2003	Tamara Tunie	As the World Turns	CBS	
2003	Tonya Williams	The Young and the Restless	CBS	
2004
2004	**Victoria Rowell**	**The Young and the Restless**	**CBS**	
2004	Renée Elise Goldsberry	One Life to Live	ABC	
2004	Tracey Ross	Passions	NBC	
2004	Tamara Tunie	As the World Turns	CBS	
2004	Tonya Williams	The Young and the Restless	CBS	
2005
2005	**Victoria Rowell**	**The Young and the Restless**	**CBS**	
2005	Marla Gibbs	Passions	NBC	
2005	Christel Khalil	The Young and the Restless	CBS	
2005	Tracey Ross	Passions	NBC	
2005	Tonya Williams	The Young and the Restless	CBS	
2006
2006	**Victoria Rowell**	**The Young and the Restless**	**CBS**	
2006	Marla Gibbs	Passions	NBC	
2006	Christel Khalil	The Young and the Restless	CBS	
2006	Tracey Ross	Passions	NBC	
2006	Tonya Williams	The Young and the Restless	CBS	
2007
2007	**Tracey Ross**	**Passions**	**NBC**	
2007	Renée Elise Goldsberry	One Life to Live	ABC	
2007	Christel Khalil	The Young and the Restless	CBS	
2007	Davetta Sherwood	The Young and the Restless	CBS	
2007	Yvonne Kopacz Wright	Guiding Light	CBS	
2008
2008	**Christel Khalil**	**The Young and the Restless**	**CBS**	
2008	Nazanin Boniadi	General Hospital	ABC	
2008	Brook Kerr	Passions	NBC	
2008	Tracey Ross	Passions	NBC	
2008	Tika Sumpter	One Life to Live	ABC	
2009
2009	**Debbi Morgan**	**All My Children**	**ABC**	
2009	Christel Khalil	The Young and the Restless	CBS	
2009	Eva Marcille	The Young and the Restless	CBS	
2009	Nia Peeples	The Young and the Restless	CBS	
2009	Tonya Williams	The Young and the Restless	CBS	

=== 2010s ===
Year	Actress	Series	Network	Ref
2010
2010	**Debbi Morgan**	**All My Children**	**ABC**	
2010	Tatyana Ali	The Young and the Restless	CBS	
2010	Daphnée Duplaix	One Life to Live	ABC	
2010	Eva Marcille	The Young and the Restless	CBS	
2010	Tonya Williams	The Young and the Restless	CBS	
2011
2011	**Tatyana Ali**	**The Young and the Restless**	**CBS**	
2011	Yvette Freeman	The Bold and the Beautiful	CBS	
2011	Julia Pace Mitchell	The Young and the Restless	CBS	
2011	Debbi Morgan	All My Children	ABC	
2011	Tonya Williams	The Young and the Restless	CBS	
2012
2012	**Tatyana Ali**	**The Young and the Restless**	**CBS**	
2012	Yvette Freeman	The Bold and the Beautiful	CBS	
2012	Christel Khalil	The Young and the Restless	CBS	
2012	Julia Pace Mitchell	The Young and the Restless	CBS	
2012	Tonya Williams	The Young and the Restless	CBS	
2013
2013	**Tatyana Ali**	**The Young and the Restless**	**CBS**	
2013	Angell Conwell	The Young and the Restless	CBS	
2013	Shenell Edmonds	One Life to Live	ABC	
2013	Kristolyn Lloyd	The Bold and the Beautiful	CBS	
2013	Julia Pace Mitchell	The Young and the Restless	CBS	
2014
2014	**Tatyana Ali**	**The Young and the Restless**	**CBS**	
2014	Angell Conwell	The Young and the Restless	CBS	
2014	Christel Khalil	The Young and the Restless	CBS	
2014	Kristolyn Lloyd	The Bold and the Beautiful	CBS	
2014	Karla Mosley	The Bold and the Beautiful	CBS	

== Multiple wins and nominations ==
=== Wins ===
12 wins

- Victoria Rowell

4 wins

- Tatyana Ali

2 wins

- Debbi Morgan
- Tonya Williams

=== Nominations ===
15 nominations

- Tonya Williams

12 nominations

- Victoria Rowell

9 nominations

- Tracey Ross

7 nominations

- Christel Khalil

5 nominations

- Tatyana Ali
- Renée Jones

4 nominations

- Debbi Morgan

3 nominations

- Julia Pace Mitchell
- Amelia Marshall

2 nominations

- Angell Conwell
- Yvette Freeman
- Marla Gibbs
- Kristolyn Lloyd
- Eva Marcille
- Tamara Tunie
- Renee Elise Goldsberry
