= Steppin: The Movie =

- Directed by: Michael Taliferro
- Written by: Sean Alexander Jefferson; Bryan Anthony Pierre
- Produced by: Michael Taliferro
- Starring: Wesley Jonathan; Chrystee Pharris
- Cinematography: Keith L. Smith
- Edited by: Craig McMahon; C. Bruno Olivieri
- Distributed by: Genius Products; The Weinstein Company
- Release date: August 11, 2009
- Running time: 138 min
- Country: United States
- Language: English
- Budget: $1 million

Steppin: The Movie is a 2009 American musical comedy film. The film stars Wesley Jonathan and Chrystee Pharris, and was the last film directed by Michael Taliferro.

== Premise ==
A college campus springs to life when the local radio station announces the official opening of the step competition season. As the fraternities and sororities work to recruit the best talent, the heat is on to win big prize money and campus bragging rights.

== Cast ==
- Wesley Jonathan as Terrence Lawerson
- Chrystee Pharris as Jennifer
- Monica Allgeier as Vicki
- Anthony Anderson as Uncle Trevor
- James Avery as The Chancellor
- Chico Benymon as Bryan
- Lil' Fizz as Jay
- J-Boog as Greg
- Mo'Nique as Aunt Carla
- Darius McCrary as Sinis
- Reginald VelJohnson as Mr. Shavers
- Dorien Wilson as James Brooks
- Kellie Shanygne Williams as CeCe
- Sticky Fingaz as Cedric
- Shar Jackson as Uwamma Layne
- Miguel A. Núñez Jr. as James
- Clifton Powell as Detective Lewis
- Roz Ryan as Roz
- Big Tigger as himself
- Slim Thug as himself
- Ronnie Jackson as himself
- Ryan Acevedo as "Ry-Ry"

== Production notes ==
Steppin: The Movie was filmed in Los Angeles, California and at Prairie View A&M University in Texas.
