= Tonya Williams =

Canadian actress and director (born 1958)

Tonya Williams OC
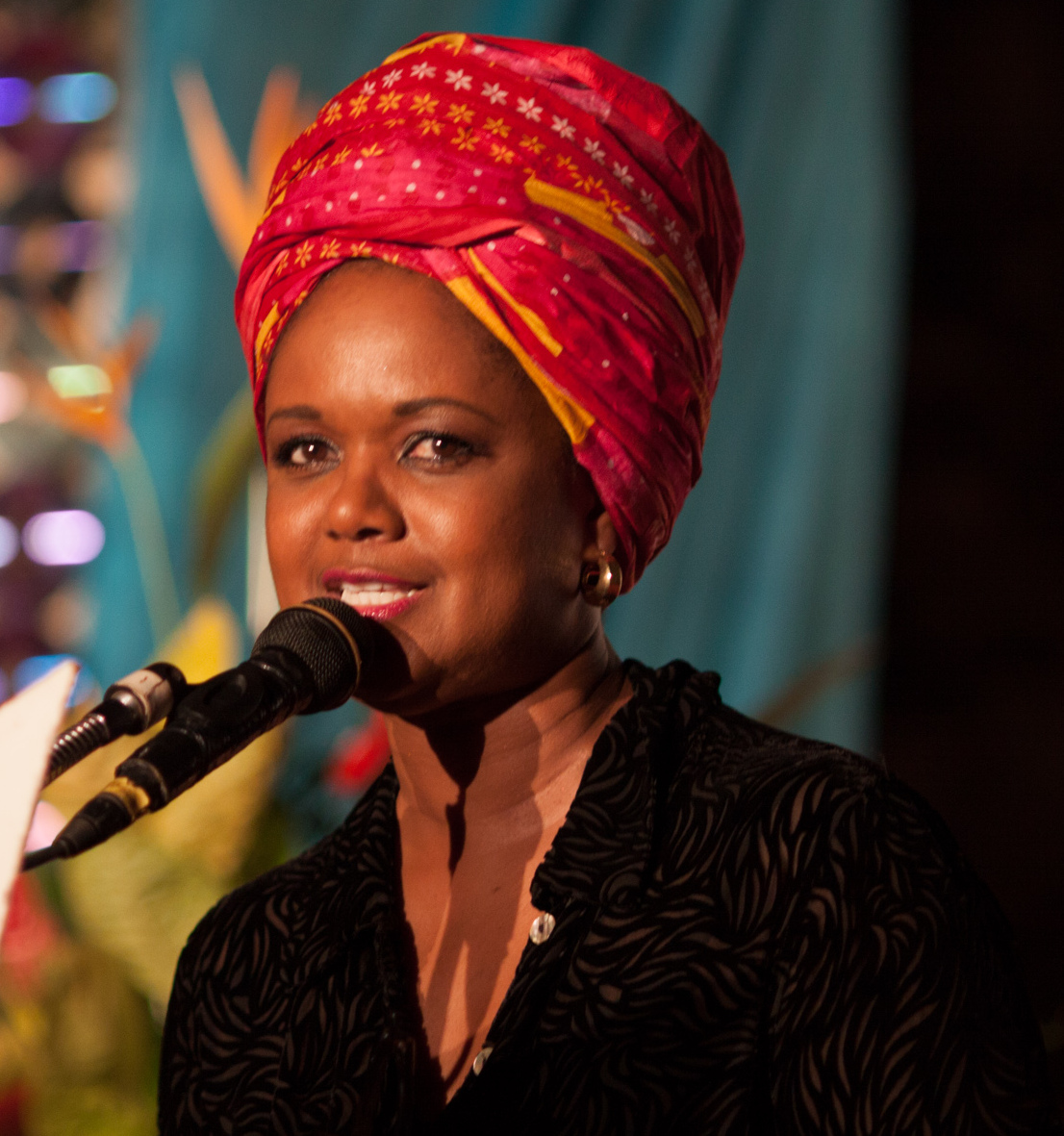
- Williams at the 2013 Zanzibar Film Festival
- Born: Tonya Maxine Williams; July 12, 1958 (age 68); London, England
- Other name: Tonya Lee Williams
- Education: Ryerson University
- Occupations: Actress, producer, director, activist
- Years active: 1977–present
- Spouse: Robert Simpson (m. 1983; div. 1991)
- Awards: Daytime Emmy Award; NAACP Image Award; ACTRA; Martin Luther King Jr. Achievement Award
- Honours: Order of Canada

Tonya Williams OC (born July 12, 1958) is a Canadian actress, producer, and activist. Sometimes credited as Tonya Lee Williams, she is best known for her role as Dr. Olivia Barber Winters on the American daytime drama The Young and the Restless from 1990 to 2005 and 2007 to 2012. She is the founder and executive director of Reelworld Film Festival.

== Early life ==
Williams was born in London, England to Jamaican parents. She lived in London and Kingston, Jamaica as a young child. At age five, she contracted rheumatic fever; she and her mother then moved to Birmingham. In 1969 she and her family settled in Oshawa, Ontario, Canada. As a teenager she modeled in Eaton's catalogues and danced on a television series called Boogie! which ran on Citytv. In 1977 Williams was crowned Miss Black Ontario. She was a student in 1977 and wanted to be a lawyer.

Williams was married to Robert Simpson from 1983 to 1991.

== Career ==
Williams' television debut was as a host of the Canadian children's show Polka Dot Door, from 1980 to 1983, after graduating from Ryerson Polytechnical Institute in 1979. Appearances on the television series Check it Out! and Generations followed. Her involvement on Generations snagged her a role on The Young and the Restless, and has become her most lucrative role. Williams won the NAACP Image Award for Outstanding Actress in a Daytime Drama Series in 2000 and 2002.

Williams appeared on A Very Brady Christmas as Cindy's roommate.

In March 2004, Williams hosted the special event program Tonya Lee Williams: Gospel Jubilee on CBC Television. She is a member of Sigma Gamma Rho sorority.

Williams is the founder, executive and artistic director of the Reelworld Film Festival, an annual film festival in Toronto that features talent from ethnically diverse communities. In 2024, she was named as the recipient of the Academy of Canadian Cinema and Television's Changemaker Award at the 12th Canadian Screen Awards, for her work with Reelworld.

In January 2025, Williams was named as the recipient of the Toronto Film Critics Association's Company 3 TFCA Luminary Award, in honour of her work with Reelworld and her other efforts to advocate on behalf of people of colour in the Canadian film industry. She selected film and television producer Leena Minifie as the recipient of the award's "pay it forward" grant.

In 2026 she was named a recipient of the Governor General's Performing Arts Award.

== Filmography ==
=== Actor ===
Tonya Williams film and television acting credits
Year	Title	Role	Notes
1980–1983	Polka Dot Door	Host	
1984	Seeing Things		Episode: "Second Sight"
1985	Check it Out!	Jennifer Woods	22 episodes
1986	As Is	TV Commentator	TV movie
1987	What's Happening Now!!	Michelle	Episode: "The New Employee"
1987	The Liberators	Jenny	On Walt Disney's Wonderful World of Color
1987	Street Legal	Belinda / Reporter	2 episodes
1987	Gimme a Break!	Judy Mitchell	Episode: "Parents' Week: Part 1"
1987	Hill Street Blues	Shirley	Episode: "It Ain't Over Till It's Over"
1987	Falcon Crest	Chase's Secretary / Lois	3 episodes
1987	Captain Power and the Soldiers of the Future	Chelsea Chandler	Episode: "And Study War No More"
1988	A Very Brady Christmas	Belinda	TV movie
1989–1990	Generations	Linda Dukes	unknown episodes
1989	Matlock	Dana Williams	Episode: "The Starlet"
1989	Nasty Boys	unknown	Nasty Boys (pilot)
1989	A Peaceable Kingdom	Colleen	3 episodes
1990–2005	The Young and the Restless	Olivia Winters	May 1990–September 7, 2005
1990	Spaced Invaders	Ernestine	
1990	Piece of Cake	Tanya	TV movie
1991	The Borrower	Desk Nurse	
1993	Counterstrike	Denise	Episode: "The Contender"
1993	Getting By	Janet	Episode: "Shop till You Drop"
1994	Silk Stalkings	Loretta Cole	Episode: "The Last Campaign"
1998	PSI Factor: Chronicles of the Paranormal	Carole Sanderson	Episode: "Bad Dreams"
2000	Seventeen Again	Monique Donovan	
2004	Tonya Lee Williams: Gospel Jubilee	Host	TV special
2005	A Perfect Note	Jasmine	TV movie
2007	Poor Boy's Game	Ruth Carvery	
2007	Finding Father's Toe	Carole	Short film
2007–2012	The Young and the Restless	Olivia Winters	April 12–13, 2007, and October 23, 2008 – February 15, 2012
2009–2010	The Border	Octavia Jones	5 episodes
2010	My Name is Khan	News Anchor	
2011	She's the Mayor	Maxine Williams	13 episodes
2011	The Bold and the Beautiful	Olivia Winters	Guest: 2 episodes (February 1–2, 2011)
2012	Cybergeddon	Donna Berg	2 episodes

=== Producer, writer and director ===
Tonya Williams producer, writer and director credits
Year	Title	Executive Producer	Writer	Director	Notes	Ref.
2001	Maple	Yes	No	No	TV movie	
2004	Tonya Lee Williams: Gospel Jubilee	Yes	Yes	No	TV special (Contributing writer)	
2004	Da Kink in My Hair	Yes	No	Yes	TV movie	

== Honours, awards and nominations ==
In 2025, Williams was conferred the honour of an Officer of the Order of Canada.

In addition, she has had the following awards and nominations.

Tonya Williams awards and nominations
Year	Award	Category	Result	Ref.
1996	Daytime Emmy Award	Outstanding Supporting Actress in a Drama Series	Nominated	
1996	NAACP Image Award	Outstanding Actress in a Daytime Drama Series	Nominated	
1997	NAACP Image Award	Outstanding Actress in a Daytime Drama Series	Nominated	
1998	NAACP Image Award	Outstanding Actress in a Daytime Drama Series	Nominated	
1999	NAACP Image Award	Outstanding Actress in a Daytime Drama Series	Nominated	
2000	Daytime Emmy Award	Outstanding Supporting Actress in a Drama Series	Nominated	
2000	NAACP Image Award	Outstanding Actress in a Daytime Drama Series	Won	
2001	NAACP Image Award	Outstanding Actress in a Daytime Drama Series	Nominated	
2002	NAACP Image Award	Outstanding Actress in a Daytime Drama Series	Won	
2003	NAACP Image Award	Outstanding Actress in a Daytime Drama Series	Nominated	
2004	NAACP Image Award	Outstanding Actress in a Daytime Drama Series	Nominated	
2005	NAACP Image Award	Outstanding Actress in a Daytime Drama Series	Nominated	
2005	ACTRA	National Award of Excellence	Won	
2006	NAACP Image Award	Outstanding Actress in a Daytime Drama Series	Nominated	
2009	NAACP Image Award	Outstanding Actress in a Daytime Drama Series	Nominated	
2010	NAACP Image Award	Outstanding Actress in a Daytime Drama Series	Nominated	
2011	NAACP Image Award	Outstanding Actress in a Daytime Drama Series	Nominated	
2012	NAACP Image Award	Outstanding Actress in a Daytime Drama Series	Nominated	
2012	Martin Luther King Jr. Achievement Award	Film and television artistic contributions.	Won	
2012	Canadian Immigrant Award	Top 25	Won	
2024	12th Canadian Screen Awards	Changemaker Award	Won	
