= Brook Kerr =

American actress

- Born: Indianapolis, Indiana, U.S.
- Occupation: Actress
- Years active: 1996–present
- Spouse(s): Christopher Warren (1992–2012)
- Children: Chris Warren

Brook Kerr is an American actress, best known for her role as Whitney Russell on the NBC daytime soap opera Passions, which she portrayed from 1999 to 2007. Since 2020, she has portrayed Dr. Portia Robinson on the ABC daytime soap opera General Hospital.

== Life and career ==
Kerr was born in Indianapolis, Indiana. Kerr moved to Los Angeles after graduating high school to pursue a career in acting. She made her television debut in 1996, appearing in an episode of UPN sitcom Moesha. She later guest-starred on The Wayans Bros., Saved by the Bell: The New Class, The Steve Harvey Show, Hang Time, Smart Guy and City Guys.

In 1999, Kerr was cast in a new soap opera Passions on NBC, where she starred as Whitney Russell Harris from the show's debut in 1999 until 2007. For her performance she received two Soap Opera Digest Awards nomination and one NAACP Image Award for Outstanding Actress in a Daytime Drama Series nomination. She is featured in Kenny Chesney's video for his 2008 single "Everybody Wants to Go to Heaven". She was also in 3T's music video "Why" feat. Michael Jackson in 1995. And she was in the Beenie Man Girls Dem Sugar Music Video Featuring American R&B Singer Mýa in 2000.

After Passions, Kerr starred opposite John Larroquette in the Hallmark Channel film McBride: Dogged and had a recurring role on the CBS prime time soap opera, Cane. In 2008, she starred as Tara Thornton in the unaired first pilot of the HBO horror series, True Blood, and was subsequently replaced by Rutina Wesley for that role. She guest-starred on CSI: Miami, NCIS: Los Angeles, Hawaii Five-O and Westworld. She also appeared in a made-for-television movies Flower Girl (2009), This Magic Moment (2013) and Mommy Is a Murderer (2020). In 2020, Kerr joined the cast of ABC soap opera, General Hospital as Dr. Portia Robinson. In 2023, she received Daytime Emmy Award for Outstanding Supporting Actress in a Drama Series nomination.

== Filmography ==
| Year | Title | Role | Notes |
|---|---|---|---|
| 1996 | Moesha | Montell Jordan's Date | Episode: "A Concerted Effort: Part 2" |
| 1996 | The Wayans Bros. | Hostess | Episode: "Goin' to the Net" |
| 1997 | Saved by the Bell: The New Class | Shauna | Episode: "It's Not About Winning" |
| 1998 | The Steve Harvey Show | Holly | Episode: "Papa's Got a Brand New Bag" |
| 1998 | Talent | Kelly | |
| 1998 | Hang Time | Gina | Episode: "Easy Credit" |
| 1998 | Smart Guy | Shakira | Episode: "Achy Breaky Heart" |
| 1998 | City Guys | Samantha | Episode: "Party of Three" |
| 1999—2007 | Passions | Whitney Russell Harris | Series regular Nominated — NAACP Image Award for Outstanding Actress in a Daytime Drama Series (2008); Nominated — Soap Opera Digest Award for Outstanding Younger Lead Actress (2005); Nominated — Soap Opera Digest Award for Favorite Triangle (2005) |
| 2000 | Shoe Shine Boys | Fan | |
| 2001 | Special Unit 2 | | Episode: "The Brothers" |
| 2007 | McBride: Dogged | Debbie | Television film |
| 2007 | Cane | Denise | Episodes: "Time Away" and "The Perfect Son" |
| 2008 | CSI: Miami | Lexa Knowles | Episode: "You May Now Kill the Bride" |
| 2008 | True Blood | Tara Thornton | Original pilot |
| 2009 | Flower Girl | Brooke Harper | Television film |
| 2010 | NCIS: Los Angeles | Sapphire | Episode: "Fame" |
| 2013 | This Magic Moment | Gina Verano | Television film |
| 2016 | The Grinder | Heather | Episode: "Delusions of Grinder" |
| 2016 | Westworld | Woman on Train | Episode: "The Original" |
| 2019 | Hawaii Five-0 | Carol | Episode: "Kuipeia E Ka Makani Apaa" |
| 2020 | Mommy Is a Murderer | Cameron | Television film |
| 2020—present | General Hospital | Dr. Portia Robinson | Series regular Nominated — Daytime Emmy Award for Outstanding Supporting Actress in a Drama Series (2023) |
