= Jane French =

American singer/songwriter

Jane French is an American singer/songwriter. French is best known for her song "Breathe", which was the theme song for the NBC & DirecTV soap opera Passions.

As a child, French grew up in Montgomery, Ohio, a suburb of Cincinnati. French learned piano at a young age as well as performed in musicals around Cincinnati, studied dance, and sang in commercials mainly for Kenner Toys. She was the voice of such products as Play-Doh and Sit 'n Spin. She attended Sycamore High School and she was the lead singer for two bands, Avatar and Frame of Mind. She went on to study Fashion Design and Communications at the University of Cincinnati.

After college, she began to pursue singing again and met with music producer, John Henry Kreitler, who was appointed composer by NBC for their new show, Passions. French and Kreitler penned the song "Breathe", which went on to be chosen as the theme song by NBC. The success of Passions led to the song being nominated at the Daytime Emmys for Best Original Song.

NBC was interested in French following the success of the song. At the time they were forming NBC Records, where French was signed as their first artist. A video was made and the single was released soon after. French also sang "The First Noel" on the NBC Celebrity Christmas CD which benefited the Children's Miracle Network.

French went on to release a full-length independent album titled Euphoria.

Most recently, her success has traveled to feature films. Two of Jane's songs, "Sixth Sense" and "Planet Love" were featured in the 2006 MGM Hilary Duff movie Material Girls. She released the album Heavenly April 24 2008.
