= Hidden Passions =

2001 novel by Tabitha Lenox

- First edition cover
- Author: Tabitha Lenox (fictional character) (actual authors are listed under the copyright as Alice Alfonsi and James E. Reilly)
- Language: English
- Subject: Novel
- Published: 2001 (HarperEntertainment)
- Publication place: United States
- Media type: Print (Hardback/Softcover)
- Pages: 338
- ISBN: 0-06-107605-8

Hidden Passions: Secrets from the Diaries of Tabitha Lenox is a tie-in novelization released by HarperEntertainment in 2001, loosely based on the NBC soap opera, Passions. It delved into the backstories of several prominent characters on the show, and was purportedly written by town witch Tabitha Lenox.

Much of the information in Hidden Passions has never been confirmed on-screen, and the book is not considered to be canon because the show has since contradicted it several times.

== Selected information unique to the novel ==
Hidden Passions provides "facts" never referenced in the series, like the names of the parents and ancestors of several of the older generation of characters. It is established that Sam Bennett is one of at least four male siblings (the show has only mentioned his younger brother Hank) with parents named Benjamin Bennett and Margaret Joyce, Gwen Hotchkiss's father Jonathan was the nephew of an English earl, and that Tabitha was responsible for a fire that killed Grace and Faith Standish's father Zachary Sutter (their mother was named Mercy Standish).

Hidden Passions also explores storylines never mentioned on the show and which do not fit within established continuity. According to the book, Julian Crane and his friend Tommy Biddles had a contest in college to see who could sleep with the most women; it was during this contest that Julian met and fell in love with Eve Johnson. (According to the show, Julian was the same age as Ivy, Sam and T.C., and wed Ivy immediately following high school.) T.C. Russell developed an addiction to pain killers after being accidentally run over by a car, whose passengers were (unbeknownst to TC) Julian and T.C.'s future wife Eve. When Pilar Lopez was fourteen, she left her family in Mexico and moved in with her uncle Carlos and aunt Marta (who lived in New Mexico) so she could get a better education and was only a couple of years older than Ivy, whereas in the show she had worked for the Winthrop family since Ivy was a small child.

== Information contradicted by the show ==
In Hidden Passions, Alistair Crane hired a man named Wilkes to kill Julian's newborn son with Eve. Wilkes in turn hired a man named Jack to carry out the deed. Jack was uncomfortable with the idea and chose to switch the boy with the body of a deceased crackbaby. Julian and Eve's son went into foster care. The Cranes, including Alistair, were unaware of this. On the series it has been implied that Alistair knew full well about the fate of his missing grandson and that he masterminded the whole thing.

In the book, Katherine Barrett Crane died of kidney failure a few years after her daughter Sheridan was born. On the series it was revealed that she and Martin Fitzgerald had faked their deaths and were living under assumed names in Puerto Arena, Mexico.

The book established that Eve was the only child of Warren Johnson and Tanya Lincoln, a wealthy couple in Boston. In the series Eve's parents were a poor couple from the south named Warren Johnson and Ruby Lincoln; after Warren's death Ruby married a man with the surname Sanbourne and the two adopted a daughter named Liz.

Rebecca Hotchkiss's maiden name in the book is Osburn while on the show it said she is descended from a long line of Osborn women. Rebecca's maiden name has never been stated on-air.
