= Cathy Jenéen Doe =

American actress

- Born: November 13, 1970 (age 55); Tallahassee, Florida, U.S.
- Other name: Cathy Doe
- Occupation: Actress
- Years active: 2001–present

Cathy Jenéen Doe (born November 13, 1970), also credited as Cathy Doe, is an American actress. She is best known for her recurring role as Simone Russell on NBC's Passions. She appeared in the hit TV show Glee. She also appeared in several small feature films and many national television commercials.

== Film and television roles ==
=== Film ===
- Expecting Love (2008) as Chloe
- Buds For Life (2004) as Reese Foster
- Five Years (2003) as Renaye Upchurch

=== Television ===
- Passions (2004–2007) as Simone Russell
- Ed (2002) as singing girl
- Go Fish (2001) as Lori
