= Chrystee Pharris =

American actress

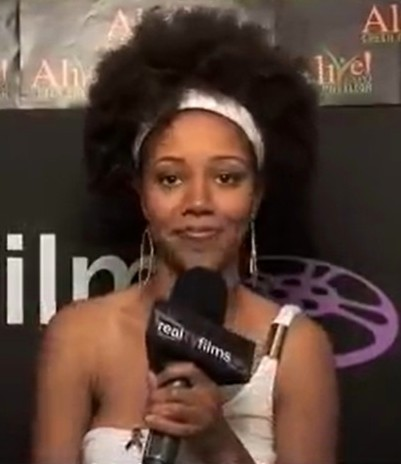
- Pharris in 2008
- Occupation: Actress
- Years active: 1996–present

Chrystee Pharris is an American actress, best known for her role as Simone Russell on the NBC daytime soap opera Passions.

== Life and career ==
Chrystee Pharris first became known as Simone Russell, a recurring character from 2001 to 2006 on the NBC-TV daytime soap opera Passions. In addition to guest appearances in single episodes of numerous prime time series, she had recurring roles on the fourth season of the series Scrubs and the third season of Goliath. She had a starring role in the three seasons of Craig Ross Jr.'s Monogamy.

In 2015, Pharris starred in the single season of the POP series, Queens of Drama.

== Filmography ==
=== Film ===
Year	Film	Role	Notes
1996	Understanding Me	Mandisa	Short film
1999	Guilty or Not	Dina Brown	Short film
2000	Leprechaun in the Hood	Girl	Direct-to-video
2004	Buds for Life	Monica Harris	
2006	Only in Your Dreams	Candi/Alicia	Short film
2006	Paved with Good Intentions	Nina Balden	
2007	Lord Help Us	Lucky's Wife	Direct-to-video
2009	Sideline Confessions	Candy	Short film
2009	Steppin: The Movie	Jennifer	
2010	My Girlfriend's Back	Trisha	
2012	Chronicle	Samantha	Voice role
2012	Faded	Jasmine	Short film
2013	The Takeover	Tisha Boyd	Short film
2014	Steps of Faith	Faith Houston	
2015	A Walk in the Woods	Ticket Agent	
2015	Fingerprints	Aphra Andrews	
2016	Fame Dogs	Skill	
2016	Bad Dad Rehab	Anitra	TV movie
2016	Diva Diaries	Robin	
2016	Bad Girl	Melinda Robinson	
2017	Media	Crystal Jones	TV movie
2018	Pierre Jackson	Phenix Summers	
2018	Spider-Man: Into the Spider-Verse	Additional voices	Voice role
2019	Loved To Death	Courtney	
2019	Spies in Disguise	Additional voices	Voice role
2021	Angel from Montgomery	June	Short film

=== Television ===
Year	Film	Role	Notes
1998	The Steve Harvey Show	Angel	Episode: "Baby You Can Drive My Car"
1998	Sister, Sister	CeeCee	Episode: "The Domino Effect"
1998	City Guys	Darice	Episode: "Big Brothers"
1998–99	Moesha	Crystal/Girl #1	Episodes: "Teacher" & "The Rite Stuff"
1999	Kenan & Kel	Rudy	Episode: "Clothes Encounters"
2000	Grown Ups	Bridgette	Episode: "Instant Karma"
2000	7th Heaven	Girl #2	Episode: "Words"
2000	General Hospital	Katie	Regular Cast
2001–06	Passions	Simone Russell	Regular Cast
2004	Eve	Courtney	Episode: "Above Average Joe"
2005	Scrubs	Kylie	Recurring role (season 4)
2005	Cuts	Miller	Episode: "Babe Magnet"
2006	Teachers.	Paula	Episode: "Field Trip"
2006	All of Us	Eva	Episode: "Pretty Woman"
2007	Lincoln Heights	Dr. Kathy McGhee	Episode: "Tricks and Treats"
2008	Players at the Poker Palace	Sandy	Episode: "I'm Outa Here"
2012	Castle	Nicky Jay	Episode: "The Limey"
2014	Satisfaction	Renee	Episode: "...Through Terms and Conditions"
2015	Nashville	Tracey Jensen	Episode: "That's the Way Love Goes"
2015	TMI Hollywood	Various/Special Guest	Episode: "The Soap Opera Show"
2015	Born Again Virgin	Angel	Episode: "No New Friends"
2015	Devious Maids	Megan	Episode: "Anatomy of a Murder"
2015	Quantico	N/A	Recurring role (season 1)
2017	Greenleaf	Simone	Episode: "Point of No Return"
2018	The Resident	Nurse Allie Palmer	Episode: "Identity Crisis" & "Run, Doctor, Run"
2018–21	Monogamy	Diandra	Main cast
2019	American Soul	Jean Jones	Episode: "Fault Lines"
2019	Goliath	Gloria	Recurring role (season 3)
2019	9-1-1	Leo's Mother	Episode: "Christmas Spirit"
2020	The Virtual End	Bridget	Episode: "Testing"
2021	The Myth of Control	Anya	Recurring role
2026	“Spider-Noir”	Secretary	Episode: “Nobody’s Hero”
