= Passions (TV series) =

American television soap opera (1999–2008)

- Genre: Soap opera; Comedy-drama; Fantasy
- Created by: James E. Reilly
- Written by: James E. Reilly (Head writer)
- Starring: Passions cast list
- Theme music composer: John Henry Kreitler
- Opening theme: "Breathe" by Jane French
- Ending theme: "Breathe" (instrumental) by Jane French
- Country of origin: United States
- Original language: English
- No. of seasons: 9
- No. of episodes: 2,231

Production
- Executive producer: Lisa de Cazotte
- Running time: 60 minutes
- Production companies: Outpost Farm Productions; NBC Studios (1999–2004); NBC Universal Television Studio (2004–2008); Universal Media Studios (2007–2008); DirecTV Original Entertainment (2007–2008)

Original release
- Network: NBC
- Release: July 5, 1999 – September 7, 2007
- Network: The 101 Network
- Release: September 17, 2007 – August 7, 2008

Passions is an American television soap opera that originally aired on NBC from July 5, 1999, to September 7, 2007, and on DirecTV's The 101 Network from September 17, 2007, to August 7, 2008. Created by screenwriter James E. Reilly and produced by NBC Studios, Passions follows the lives, loves and various romantic and paranormal adventures of the residents of Harmony, a small town in New England with many secrets.

Storylines center on the interactions among members of its multi-racial core families: the African American Russells, the white Cranes and Bennetts, and half-Mexican half-Irish Lopez-Fitzgeralds. The series also features supernatural elements, which focus mainly on town witch Tabitha Lenox (Juliet Mills) and her doll-come-to-life, Timmy (Josh Ryan Evans).

NBC cancelled Passions on January 16, 2007. The series was subsequently picked up by DirecTV. The series aired its final episode on NBC on September 7, 2007, with new episodes continuing on DirecTV's 101 Network starting on September 17. In December 2007, just months after picking up the series, DirecTV decided not to renew its contract for Passions, and the studio was subsequently unable to sell the series elsewhere. The final episode was broadcast in August 2008. Passions was the last daytime television soap opera created for American network television until Beyond the Gates premiered on CBS in February 2025.

== Series history ==
Original cast of Passions

In the early days of the show, Passions heroine Sheridan Crane is identified as a close friend of Diana, Princess of Wales; soon Sheridan recalls speaking to Diana on the phone immediately before the 1997 car crash in which Diana was killed. Sheridan also has a similar accident in the same Paris tunnel, and speaks to a "guardian Angel Diana" who urges her to fight to survive, which drew considerable controversy. Sheridan later adopts the name Diana after a boating accident that results in amnesia.

For much of the first three to four years of the series, supernatural elements such as witches, warlocks, and closet doors leading to Hell were major plot points, many surrounding the machinations of the centuries-old witch Tabitha Lenox and her doll-brought-to-life sidekick, Timmy—named by Entertainment Weekly as one of their "17 Great Soap Supercouples" in 2008. Tabitha's enemy, and Timmy's adoring puppy love was Charity Standish (Molly Stanton), a saccharine young woman who would regularly become possessed by the "forces of evil."In 2001, HarperEntertainment released Hidden Passions, a tie-in novelization presented as Tabitha's diary, exposing the secrets and pasts of the town's residents. Passions featured a story-line involving Tabitha and Timmy promoting the book, which reached No. 4 on the real-life New York Times Best Seller list and garnered the series two alternative covers of TV Guide in July 2001.

In 2003, Passions submitted an orangutan named BamBam, who had been portraying the recurring role of Precious, for a Daytime Emmy Award. Precious was the non-speaking live-in nurse and caregiver for elderly Edna Wallace, and held an unrequited love for Luis Lopez-Fitzgerald, which was depicted in elaborate fantasy sequences. In early 2004, the National Academy of Television Arts and Sciences, which administers the awards, disallowed the entry with the following statement:

Our ruling is based on the belief that the Academy must draw a line of distinction between animal characters that aren't capable of speaking parts and human actors whose personal interpretation in character portrayal creates nuance and audience engagement that uniquely qualifies those performers for consideration of television's highest honor.

By 2004, the character's Antonio Lopez-Fitzgerald, Charity Standish, David Hastings, Hank Bennett, John Hastings, Miguel Lopez-Fitzgerald, and Reese Durkee either were written out, or recurring. Introduced were Katherine Crane and Martin Fitzgerald, Valerie Davis—who was later revealed to be Vincent—and the long-awaited on-screen appearance of Alistair Crane. Charity's departure also diminished Tabitha Lenox's prominence, reducing her role largely to observing Harmony's residents through her enchanted bowl. As a result, the show's remaining supernatural elements no longer carried the same weight alongside the more conventional storytelling that had previously defined Passions. In response, the series shifted its focus toward increasingly sensational and outlandish plots. In summer 2005, the prominent character Simone Russell came out as gay; Passions made daytime history by being the first serial to show two women—Simone and love interest Rae Thomas—in bed making love. In 2007, it was revealed that longtime hero Chad Harris-Crane was cheating on his wife with another man. This was also a daytime first, with the men portrayed in bed together, committing—albeit unknowingly—incest. Passions also portrayed Vincent as an intersex person who became pregnant with his own father's son.

Nearly seven years after the debut of Passions on July 5, 1999, the NBC-owned Sci Fi Channel began airing the series from its first episode starting February 13, 2006. Due to low ratings, the reruns were taken off the air as of May 25, 2006. On August 15, 2006, Passions became the first daytime drama to make full episodes available for download and purchase from the digital music store iTunes. On November 6, 2006, the show also became the first daytime drama to make full episodes available for free viewing via streaming on NBC.com.

Though plagued since its inception by low overall Nielsen ratings, Passions was historically top-rated in key demographics, namely the female 12-to-17 demographic; Passions and Days of Our Lives usually occupied the top two positions among all soaps in this age group.

=== Move to DirecTV ===
On January 17, 2007, NBC announced that it would not renew Passions for a ninth season, in order to accommodate a planned expansion of its morning news and talk show Today to a fourth hour. NBC reclaimed the program's hour-long slot in order to extend Today into the 10:00 am ET hour, rather than acquiring an extra hour of programming time already allocated to its stations for syndicated or local programs. NBC soon began shopping the series to other networks. In April 2007, satellite television provider DirecTV reached an agreement with NBCUniversal Television Studio to acquire the exclusive broadcast rights to Passions, with most of the serial's principal cast members staying on.

Ahead of the move from NBC to DirecTV, the call-in aftershow Passions Live, hosted by Eric Martsolf (who succeeded original cast member Travis Schuldt as Ethan Winthrop in 2002), premiered on DirecTV's general entertainment network The 101 in August 2007, making Passions the first (and only) American soap opera to ever have a live talk show. Airing weekly on Thursday nights until October 2007 and streamed simultaneously on NBC.com's official Passions website, the show gave fans the chance to call into the program and interact live with cast members from the soap. Passions ended its NBC run after eight seasons on September 7, 2007, leaving Days of Our Lives as the network's lone remaining soap opera and conventional daytime program (until it was moved to the co-owned Peacock streaming service in September 2022 to accommodate the afternoon newscast NBC News Daily); new episodes subsequently began airing on The 101 ten days later on September 17, becoming the first (and as of 2024, only) American daytime network soap opera to move their first-run episodes to a linear subscription television service.

With the move to The 101, episodes were reduced to four days a week, airing Monday–Thursday at 2:00 pm ET/11 am PT (retaining the timeslot it had held since its NBC debut), with repeats airing later in the day and on weekends. NBC.com continued to maintain Passions' official website after the series moved over to DirecTV; however, first-run episodes were no longer made available to stream for free on NBC's website or for purchase at iTunes. Initially, new episodes were supposed to air exclusively on DirecTV after the soap concluded its run on NBC; however, on September 27, 2007, DirecTV announced it would provide viewers who were not already DirecTV subscribers an "All Access Pass to Passions" to stream all newer episodes on NBC.com after their initial airing on The 101 for a monthly fee. This subscription offering launched on October 1, 2007, originally priced at $19.99 per month (later reduced to $14.99 when Passions cut its weekly schedule from four episodes to three). In another first for the soap opera genre, episodes airing on The 101 included an interactive feature allowing viewers to answer a special Passions trivia question that appeared on-screen as a pop-up using their remote control.

On December 10, 2007, Variety magazine and various cast members confirmed that DirecTV had decided not to renew Passions for a tenth season, but extended its existing order to include 52 additional episodes to be taped through March 2008. In January 2008, DirecTV reduced the show's schedule to three episodes per week, airing Monday through Wednesday. Universal Media Studios wrapped up production of Passions on March 28, 2008. As confirmed by original cast member McKenzie Westmore (Sheridan Crane), the cast and crew were told at the wrap party that efforts to find a new outlet had failed and that the show's cancellation was final. New episodes continued to air on The 101 until August 7, 2008, when Passions ended its nine-season run. Though Passions had been the highest-rated original program on DirecTV's The 101, it was reported that the network had failed to meet the projected number of new subscribers they had hoped to attract with the series.

The show presented a number of plots and mysteries that were never fully solved during its nine seasons. The fates of Charity Standish, David Hastings, Liz Sanbourne, Spike Lester, John Hastings, Hank Bennett, Martin Fitzgerald, Katherine Crane, and Rachel Barrett were among the main plot points that remained unresolved in the series finale. It was believed that Beth Wallace Crane, her father Alistair Crane, and her abducted nephew Marty Crane Lopez-Fitzgerald perished in a 2006 train explosion. But when Alistair and Marty were later found to be alive, Beth's fate remained unclear and it was suggested that she might have also survived. Theresa's brief romantic interest, Jared Casey, was hinted to have a secretive or enigmatic past, but it was never made clear what that past was, and the character of Chris Booth was revealed as a spy for Alaistair Crane, but his past misdeeds were never revealed to Sheridan or Luis. 2006 saw the revelation of Ivy Crane's blackmail schemes involving David and John Hastings. But Ivy never revealed what the secret was that she had been using to coerce Hastings. For years, Kay mistreated Miguel and even used witchcraft to disguise herself as Charity in order to rape him, and conceive his child. This act was always portrayed as evil rather than as a desperate move by a beloved heroine, but was never revealed to anyone despite Kay's guilty conscience and supposed love for Miguel.

The way "Passions" handled its main romantic pairings was the most persistent source of contention and criticism among the series' various fans. Luis Lopez-Fitzgerald and Sheridan Crane's star-crossed romance served as the show's emotional center from the beginning. Classified as "Soulmates" Luis and Sheridan are continually kept apart by circumstance — mirrored by their past lives as Mark Antony and Cleopatra and passengers on the RMS Titanic, among others — as well as other love interests; Sheridan's marriages to Luis's brother, Antonio Lopez-Fitzgerald, and photographer Chris Boothe eventually lead Luis to find happiness with Sheridan's niece, Fancy Crane, much to Sheridan's chagrin. After years of surviving kidnappings, the torture of their son Marty by Luis jealous ex-fiancee Beth who happened to be Sheridan's half-sister, and numerous fictitious deaths, the writers chose to permanently split the couple apart rather than give them a happy ending, as several backstage incidents including the elongated 2007–08 Writers Guild of America strike, and the strain of the health of creator and head writer James E. Reilly- who would pass away two months after the series end- boggled the serial as it moved to its hasty conclusion. Strikebreaker writers had to jam multiple years' worth of planned, long-term storylines into a few months, the onscreen product becoming frenzied in such an allotted amount of time. Had the series continued, Reilly would have handed head writing duties to Marlene Clark Poulter, and Shawn Morrison.

The final batch of episodes required writers to rapidly tie up nearly a decade of loose ends, resulting in a finale that included a double wedding, the literal baptism of the 300-year-old town witch Tabitha, and characters actively preventing a local volcano from destroying Harmony. In the end, Luis wed Fancy Crane, Sheridan's niece, while a severely traumatized Sheridan was both by choice and forced to face what had become of her character, and to resume her relationship with the newly resurrected character of Antonio. Theresa Lopez-Fitzgerald, the main character, did eventually tie the knot with Ethan Winthrop, but only after Gwen and Rebecca Hotchkiss's nefarious plans were revealed by a timely audio recording. Due to the rapid pace of events, Gwen and Rebecca were thrust into redemption arcs that felt wholly undeserved. Theresa turned straight to the camera, broke the fourth wall, : "So, after all these years, I know one thing for sure. Always follow your passion. Because that, and that alone, will lead you to your happy ending.”. Adding to the heavy emotional atmosphere of the final weeks of production, the cast was still deeply affected by the legacy of Josh Ryan Evans (who played Timmy the living doll). In the final frames of the series finale that aired in August 2008, actress Juliet Mills (Tabitha) broke character alongside the rest of the cast to wave goodbye to the audience while holding up a framed photograph of Evans, serving as a poignant, tearful real-world goodbye to their late co-star.

== Theme song and opening sequence ==
The theme song for Passions is titled "Breathe"; it was performed by Jane French and written by French and John Henry Kreitler. A long version of this theme was also released but was never used on the show.

The opening title sequence used since the show's premiere in 1999 features shots of the city of Harmony and its landmarks (actually the real-life town of Camden, Maine). The sequence opens and closes with the show's logo in an italic typeface and in an Arial Black typeface in generic caps posted in front of the cursive form of the title. The opening theme is sometimes shortened to the last two verses to fit in extra scene time.

== Ratings and broadcasting history ==
=== United States ===
A replacement for the serial Another World (which ended on June 25, 1999 after a 35-year run) on NBC's daytime schedule, Passions debuted in tenth place among the eleven soaps airing on American network television at the time, ahead of only fellow NBC soap Sunset Beach, with a 2.1 rating (1.9 million viewers) and remained there until Sunset Beach ended its run in December 1999 following its cancellation three months earlier. From January 2000 until early May, the show came in last place in the ratings among the ten soaps on the air then. During the May 2000 sweeps period, Passions gained in popularity and pulled ahead of ABC's Port Charles. Passions remained ahead of Port Charles until the latter show's cancellation in October 2003. From then on, Passions once again was last in the American daytime ratings, where it would stay for virtually the rest of its run. It did top Guiding Light on occasion, but never for more than one week at a time. From 2001 to 2003, when Passions was at the peak of its popularity, it averaged a weekly 2.1–2.3 rating (roughly 2.4 million viewers). However, the ratings slowly declined each year afterwards; by the 2006–07 season, the show averaged a 1.5 weekly rating (about 1.9 million viewers). The final episode on NBC had a household rating of 1.3/4 (1.68 million viewers). No ratings information was ever released for the show's run on DirecTV.

While Passions was never a big hit in household ratings, the show was a powerhouse in the younger-skewing demographics. For its entire NBC run, it ranked as the No. 1 soap among girls aged 12 to 17 and women aged 18 to 24. The show also ranked at No. 2 among women aged 18 to 34, and even overtook fellow NBC soap Days of Our Lives for a short period during the 2004–05 season. In the crucial 18-to-49 demographic, Passions usually ranked No. 7, ahead of CBS soaps As the World Turns and Guiding Light. The highest ranking Passions ever achieved in the 18-to-49 demographic was fourth place in November 2002 and once again in January 2007.

During its NBC run, Passions ran for 60 minutes every weekday (excluding some holidays). For its final season on NBC (2006–07), episodes were available online at NBC.com for free viewing and for purchase on iTunes. After the move to DirecTV, the schedule was shortened to four days a week (Monday through Thursday) plus weekend marathon encores, then later three days a week (Monday through Wednesday) starting in January 2008 until the finale. Initially, DirecTV episodes were only available on its own exclusive channel; later they were made available for a paid subscription fee at NBC.com.

=== Canada ===
Passions aired in Canada for its entire NBC run, first on CTV in 1999 and then on Global TV in 2000. The series lasted there until its final airdate on NBC in September 2007, at which time it was then succeeded by Guiding Light in the same time slot. NTV in Newfoundland and Labrador also aired Passions for almost its entire NBC run and was replaced by As the World Turns just before the series ended on NBC. On July 3, 2007 it was reported that new Canadian premium television service Super Channel would air the DirecTV episodes of Passions in Canada when the channel launched in October 2007. Those episodes premiered on Super Channel on October 8, 2007 (airing two new episodes at a time only until it caught up to the DirecTV episodes) and ran until the series finale on August 7, 2008. On August 11, 2008, Super Channel began to air Passions from the premiere episode. Season 2 re-ran on Super Channel starting August 2009 and season 3 in 2010. Season 4 premiered on July 14, 2011. Passions run on Super Channel ended on July 3, 2012. Super Channel chose not to renew their contract due to technical issues.

=== Australia ===
Passions was broadcast nationally in Australia on the Seven Network each weekday at 3:00 pm, beginning on 29 January 2001 with the series' 1999 episodes. In 2005, the series was moved to an earlier 9:30 am time slot, before the show's international licensing was cancelled due to the music copyright fees. Passions then went into re-runs in a 2 am weekday-morning time slot, before ultimately ending with a "series finale."

=== Croatia ===
In Croatia, private televizor Nova TV aired the first two seasons of the show (520 episodes). The show was well received by the public, but badly by the critics.

== Awards and nominations ==
Passions has been honored with numerous awards and nominations during its run, including Daytime Emmy Awards, Imagen Foundation Awards, and a GLAAD Media Award.

== Critical reception ==
At its debut, reviews for the series were mixed. The Orlando Sentinel gave Passions a "bleak prognosis" regarding the Diana, Princess of Wales controversy. Their critic wrote: "A show's dearth of creativity is evident when it shamelessly keeps picking over the bones of the dead. Passions seems to have a death wish." Time magazine wrote that apart from the show's supernatural elements, "Passions would appear indistinguishable from almost any other soap opera." Unlike the Orlando Sentinel, Time approved of the Diana, Princess of Wales link, stating that it showed that Passions was not "devoid of promise" and that the storyline showed "flashes of a certain kind of genius."

By 2001, Michael Logan of TV Guide remarked of Passions, "There hasn't been this sort of buzz about a soap since the Luke and Laura days on General Hospital...It's unlike anything else out there. There's a real sense of hipness to it."

Craig Tomashoff of The New York Times praised the campy storylines by calling Passions the "Twin Peaks of daytime": "It's a staggeringly psychotic blend of supernatural thriller, melodramatic soap opera and situation comedy, featuring acting that would make a pro wrestler blush. I'm never quite sure whether this is a laughing at or a laughing with kind of show; either way, I'm still laughing."

== Cast ==
Juliet Mills and Josh Ryan Evans as Tabitha and Timmy

=== Main ===
Actor	Character	Duration
Juliet Mills (Note: Jane Carr temporarily played Tabitha twice while Mills was on vacation.)	Tabitha Lenox	1999–2008
Josh Ryan Evans	Timmy Lenox	1999–2002
Eva Tamargo	Pilar Lopez-Fitzgerald	1999–2008
Silvana Arias	Paloma Lopez-Fitzgerald (#1)	2004–2007
Hannia Guillen	Paloma Lopez-Fitzgerald (#2)	2007–2008
Galen Gering	Luis Lopez-Fitzgerald	1999–2008
Lindsay Hartley (Note: Priscilla Garita temporarily played Theresa from August to October 2004 while Hartley was on maternity leave.)	Theresa Lopez-Fitzgerald	1999–2008
Jesse Metcalfe (Note: Jaylen Moore temporarily played Miguel in December 2005.)	Miguel Lopez-Fitzgerald (#1)	1999–2004
Adrian Bellani	Miguel Lopez-Fitzgerald (#2)	2006–2007
Blair Redford	Miguel Lopez-Fitzgerald (#3)	2007–2008
Christopher Douglas (Note: Joseph Tuccio temporarily played Antonio in a vision in 2007.)	Antonio Lopez-Fitzgerald (#1)	2001–2004 (recurring thereafter), 2008
Richard Steinmetz (Note: William Bumiller temporarily played Martin in a recurring capacity from November of 1999 until March 2000.)	Martin Fitzgerald (#2)	2004–2006
Ben Masters	Julian Crane	1999–2008
Alan Oppenheimer (Note: Bill Dempsey and later Michael McNabb served as Alastairs' body double until September 2004.)	Voice of Alistair Crane (#1)	1999–2004
David Bailey	Alistair Crane (#2)	2004–2005
John Reilly	Alistair Crane (#3)	2005–2006 (recurring thereafter)
Melinda Sward	Pretty Crane	2007–2008 (recurring previously)
McKenzie Westmore (Note: Shannon Sturges and Kam Heskin temporarily played Sheridan from 2005, 2006, and 2008 while Westmore was either ill or on maternity leave.)	Sheridan Crane	1999–2008
Kim Johnston Ulrich	Ivy Winthrop Crane	1999–2008
Emily Harper (Note: Krissy Carlson temporarily played Fancy in March 2008.)	Fancy Lopez-Fitzgerald	2005–2008
Justin Hartley	Nicholas Foxworth Crane (#1)	2002–2006
Mark Cameron Wystrach (Note: Nick Stabile and Eric Melander temporarily played Fox from August to October 2004 while Justin Hartley was on paternity leave, and after September 2007 when Wystrach decided not to continue with the series when it moved to DIRECTV.)	Nicholas Foxworth Crane (#2)	2006–2007
Andrea Evans (Note: Maureen McCormick originated the role but did not want to continue after the characters initial first ten episodes. Evans extended it to recurring capacity.)	Rebecca Hotchkiss	2000–2008
Liza Huber	Gwen Hotchkiss (#1)	1999–2000, 2002–2008
Natalie Zea	Gwen Hotchkiss (#2)	2000–2002
Sharon Wyatt (Note: Susan Ferguson played Rachel before Wyatt was cast, and served as a body double as well..)	Rachel Barrett	2005–2006
Travis Schuldt	Ethan Winthrop (#1)	1999–2002
Eric Martsolf (Note: Rib Hillis filled in for Martsolf in 2006 while he was on paternity leave.)	Ethan Winthrop (#2)	2002–2008
Leigh Taylor-Young (Note: Elizabeth Storm originated the role intermittently from December 2000 until September 2003.)	Katherine Barrett Crane	2004–2006
Dana Sparks (Note: Jennifer Doubleday acted as a stand in for both sisters.')	Faith Standish; Grace Bennett	1999, 2004; 1999–2004 (recurring thereafter)
Molly Stanton (Note: Lisa Hoyle acted as The Zombies true form while also serving as Stanton's stand in and stunt double. Kristina Sisco was a recurring version of Charity in 2006, who was later deemed an imposter. Sisco guest starred as the real Charity in a cameo in 2007, the final appearance of the character before leaving for a convent in the Bahamas.')	Charity Standish (#1); Zombie Charity	1999–2004; 2001–2002
James Hyde	Sam Bennett	1999–2008
Dalton James	Hank Bennett (#1)	1999–2001
Ryan McPartlin	Hank Bennett (#2)	2001–2004 (recurring thereafter)
Dylan Fergus	Noah Bennett	2005–2008
Taylor Anne Mountz (Note: Gina Marie May served as a temporary replacement after Mountz decided to vacate the role to attend college, and another actress could assume the role on a permanent capacity.')	Kay Bennett (#1)	1999–2000
Deanna Wright	Kay Bennett (#2)	2000–2003
Heidi Mueller	Kay Lopez-Fitzgerald (#3)	2003–2008
Mary Elizabeth Winstead	Jessica Bennett (#1)	1999–2000
Jade Harlow (Note: Michelle Holgate substituted for Harlow for a day in July 2002.)	Jessica Bennett (#2)	2000–2002
Danica Stewart	Jessica Bennett Lester (#3)	2003–2007
Jason Olive	Frank Lomax	1999
Rodney Van Johnson	T.C. Russell	1999–2007
Tracey Ross	Eve Russell	1999–2008
Brook Kerr (Note: Vocalist Jania Foxworth dubbed the singing voice of Whitney Russell throughout the character's arc.)	Whitney Harris-Crane	1999–2007
Lena Cardwell	Simone Russell (#1)	1999–2001
Chrystee Pharris	Simone Russell (#2)	2001–2004
Cathy Jeneen Doe	Simone Russell (#3)	2004–2007
Donn Swaby	Chad Harris (#1)	1999–2002
Charles Divins	Chad Harris-Crane (#2)	2002–2007
Kacie Borrowman	Cracked Connie	2002
Brandi Burkhardt	Siren	2006
Erin Cardillo	Esme Vanderheusen	2007–2008 (recurring previously)
Justin Carroll (Note: Julian Stone stood in for Carroll on a few episodes in 2003.)	David Hastings (#1)	2001–2004 (recurring thereafter)
Jack Krizmanich	John Hastings	2001–2004
Bruce Michael Hall (Note: Seth Hall, Bruce's twin brother took over the role in 2003.)	Reese Durkee (#1)	2000–2002 (recurring previously and thereafter)
Kyrie Maezumi	Maya Chinn	2006 (recurring previously and thereafter)
Amelia Marshall	Liz Sanbourne	2001–2006 (recurring previously and thereafter)
Kelli McCarty	Beth Wallace	2002–2004 (recurring previously and thereafter)
Kathleen Noone	Edna Wallace	2003–2004 (recurring previously and thereafter)
Victor McCay	Doc	2001–2002 (recurring thereafter)
Alisa Reyes	Syd Valentine	2003
Daphnee Duplaix Samuel (Note: Siena Goines filled in the role during Duplaixs' maternity leave.)	Valerie Davis (#1)	2004–2007 (recurring thereafter)
James Stevenson	Jared Casey	2006–2007
Adrian Wilson (Note: Marsh Mokhtari played the part in July 2006.)	Chris Boothe	2005–2007

=== Noted guest stars ===
In a nod to Bewitched, Bernard Fox appeared as that series' "Dr. Bombay" on Passions in 1999 and 2000.Alice Ghostley, who portrayed bumbling witch Esmeralda on Bewitched, also appeared on Passions in 2000 as the ghost of Matilda Matthews, a friend and rival witch from Tabitha's past in colonial New England. Comedian Ruth Buzzi portrayed Nurse Kravitz, an eccentric nurse who discovers that the character Endora has a demon tail, in 2003.Marla Gibbs appeared in 2004 and 2005 as Irma Johnson, the cantankerous aunt of Eve Russell and Liz Sanbourne. Gibbs was nominated for an NAACP Image Award for Outstanding Actress in a Daytime Drama Series for the role. From 2005 to 2006, Julia Duffy portrayed the Mother Superior at the convent to which Whitney Russell flees, and Georgia Engel played Esmeralda, Tabitha's childhood rival, in a 2007 Wicked-themed storyline.

Professional basketball player Robert Horry appeared as himself in 1999, as did singer Mýa in 2003 and the band Scissor Sisters in 2007. Judge Mablean Ephriam also portrayed herself in a 2003 fantasy sequence in which the character T. C. and Eve Russell go on the Divorce Court television program.

The band Scissor Sisters appeared on two February 2007 episodes and performed two songs from their Ta-Dah album: "Land of a Thousand Words" on February 8 and "I Don't Feel Like Dancin'" on February 9.

Juliet Mills' daughter Melissa Caulfield appeared in 1999 and 2005 as Nanny Phoebe Figalilly, a role played by Mills in the sitcom Nanny and the Professor. Gabby Tamargo, daughter of Eva Tamargo, portrayed a young version of the elder Tamargo's character, Pilar Lopez-Fitzgerald, in 2008.

== Hidden Passions ==
1st edition cover of Hidden Passions

In 2001, HarperEntertainment released Hidden Passions: Secrets from the Diaries of Tabitha Lenox, a tie-in novelization presented as Tabitha's diary, exposing the secrets and pasts of the town's residents. Passions featured a storyline involving Tabitha and Timmy promoting the book, which reached No. 4 on the real-life New York Times Best Seller list and garnered the series two alternative covers of TV Guide in July 2001. While the novel was billed as being canonical, by the show's final episode, the televised canon had diverged significantly from the novel since its publication.

== See also ==
- List of Passions awards
- List of Passions crew
- List of American daytime soap opera ratings
