= 38th NAACP Image Awards =

American entertainment awards for 2006 works

- Date: March 2, 2007
- Venue: Shrine Auditorium
- Hosted by: LL Cool J

The 38th NAACP Image Awards ceremony, presented by the National Association for the Advancement of Colored People (NAACP), honored the best in film, television, music of 2006 and took place on March 2, 2007, at the Shrine Auditorium. The show was televised live on Fox at 8 p.m. EST and hosted by LL Cool J. The nominees were announced on January 7, 2007, at a press conference in at the Peninsula Hotel in Beverly Hills, California. The winners and nominees are shown below. The winners are indicated in bold.

== List of nominees and winners ==
=== Television ===
==== Comedy ====
===== Outstanding Comedy Series =====
- All of Us
- The Bernie Mac Show
- Everybody Hates Chris
- Girlfriends
- **Ugly Betty**

===== Outstanding Actor in a Comedy Series =====
- Bernie Mac - The Bernie Mac Show
- Donald Faison – Scrubs
- Duane Martin – All of Us
- George Lopez – The George Lopez Show
- **Tyler James Williams – Everybody Hates Chris**

===== Outstanding Actress in a Comedy Series =====
- America Ferrera – Ugly Betty
- Maya Rudolph – Saturday Night Live
- Raven-Symoné – That's So Raven
- Tichina Arnold – Everybody Hates Chris
- **Tracee Ellis Ross – Girlfriends**

===== Outstanding Supporting Actor in a Comedy Series =====
- Antonio Fargas – Everybody Hates Chris
- **Reggie Hayes – Girlfriends**
- Romany Malco – Weeds
- Terry Crews – Everybody Hates Chris
- Victor Williams – The King of Queens

===== Outstanding Supporting Actress in a Comedy Series =====
- Dee Dee Davis – The Bernie Mac Show
- LisaRaye McCoy – All of Us
- Telma Hopkins – Half & Half
- **Vanessa L. Williams – Ugly Betty**
- Whoopi Goldberg– Everybody Hates Chris

==== Drama ====
===== Outstanding Drama Series =====
- 24
- **Grey's Anatomy**
- Heroes
- The Unit
- The Wire

===== Outstanding Actor Drama Series =====
- Dennis Haysbert – The Unit
- Hill Harper – CSI: NY
- **Isaiah Washington – Grey's Anatomy**
- Jesse L. Martin – Law & Order
- Michael K. Williams – The Wire

===== Outstanding Actress Drama Series =====
- CCH Pounder – The Shield
- Jennifer Beals – The L Word
- **Kimberly Elise – Close to Home**
- Regina Taylor – The Unit
- Roselyn Sánchez – Without a Trace

===== Outstanding Supporting Actor Drama Series =====
- Gary Dourdan – CSI: Crime Scene Investigation
- Glynn Turman – The Wire
- James Pickens Jr. – Grey's Anatomy
- **Omar Epps – House**
- Wendell Pierce – The Wire

===== Outstanding Supporting Actress Drama Series =====
- **Chandra Wilson – Grey's Anatomy**
- Khandi Alexander – CSI: Miami
- Marianne Jean-Baptiste – Without a Trace
- S. Epatha Merkerson – Law & Order
- Sanaa Lathan– Nip/Tuck

==== Movie, Mini-Series, or Dramatic Special ====
===== Outstanding Television Movie, Mini-Series or Dramatic Special =====
- Life is Not a Fairytale: The Fantasia Barrino Story
- Sleeper Cell: American Terror
- Tsunami: The Aftermath
- The Untold Story of Emmett Louis Till
- **When the Levees Broke: A Requiem in Four Acts**

===== Outstanding Actor in a Television Movie, Mini-Series or Dramatic Special =====
- Andre Braugher – Thief (TV series)
- Chiwetel Ejiofor – Tsunami, the Aftermath
- Clarence Williams III – Mystery Woman
- **Kadeem Hardison – Life Is Not a Fairytale: The Fantasia Barrino Story**
- Michael Ealy – Sleeper Cell: American Terror

===== Outstanding Actress in a Television Movie, Mini-Series or Dramatic Special =====
- Aisha Tyler – For One Night
- Fantasia Barrino – Life is Not a Fairytale: The Fantasia Barrino Story
- Loretta Devine – Life is Not a Fairytale: The Fantasia Barrino Story
- Patti LaBelle – Why I Wore Lipstick to My Mastectomy
- **Sophie Okonedo – Tsunami, the Aftermath**

==== Daytime Drama ====
===== Outstanding Actor in a Daytime Drama Series =====
- Antonio Sabato Jr. – The Bold and the Beautiful
- Bryton McClure – The Young and the Restless
- James Reynolds – Days of Our Lives
- **Kristoff St. John – The Young and the Restless**
- Michael B. Jordan – All My Children

===== Outstanding Actress in a Daytime Drama Series =====
- Christel Khalil – The Young and the Restless
- Davetta Sherwood – The Young and the Restless
- Renée Elise Goldsberry – One Life to Live
- **Tracey Ross – Passions**
- Yvonna Wright – Guiding Light

==== Variety Programming ====
===== Outstanding Reality Series =====
- **American Idol**
- America's Next Top Model
- Black. White.
- Dancing with the Stars
- Run's House

===== Outstanding Variety - Series or Special =====
- 2006 Black Movie Awards – A Celebration of Black Cinema: Past, Present, and Future
- BET Awards 2006
- Cedric the Entertainer: Taking You Higher
- **An Evening of Stars: Tribute to Stevie Wonder**
- Jamie Foxx: Unpredictable

===== Outstanding Children’s Program =====
- The Backyardigans
- Dora the Explorer
- High School Musical
- Romeo!
- **That's So Raven**

===== Outstanding Performance in a Youth/Children's Program - Series or Special =====
- Corbin Bleu – High School Musical
- Kathleen Herles – Dora the Explorer
- Kyle Massey – That's So Raven
- **Raven-Symoné – That's So Raven**
- Romeo – Romeo!

=== Music Categories ===
==== Outstanding New Artist ====
- Cherish
- **Corinne Bailey Rae**
- LeToya
- Lupe Fiasco
- Mario Vazquez

==== Outstanding Male Artist ====
- Chris Brown
- Jay-Z
- John Legend
- Lionel Richie
- **Prince**

==== Outstanding Female Artist ====
- Beyoncé
- Corinne Bailey Rae
- Fantasia
- India.Arie
- **Mary J. Blige**

==== Outstanding Duo or Group ====
- The Cheetah Girls
- Dave Matthews Band
- Gnarls Barkley
- Outkast
- **The Roots**

==== Outstanding Jazz Artist ====
- George Duke
- Gerald Albright
- **Gladys Knight**
- Regina Carter
- Take 6

==== Outstanding Gospel Artist -- Traditional or Contemporary ====
- Andraé Crouch – Mighty Wind
- The Cast of Inspired By...The Bible Experience– Inspired...The Bible Experience: New Testament
- Fred Hammond – Free To Worship
- **Kirk Franklin – Imagine Me**
- Patti LaBelle – The Gospel According To Patti

==== Outstanding Music Video ====
- Beyoncé – Irreplaceable
- India.Arie – I Am Not My Hair
- Jay-Z – Show Me What You Got
- **Mary J. Blige – Be Without You**
- Prince – Black Sweat

==== Outstanding Song ====
- "Be Without You"– Mary J. Blige
- "Crazy" – Gnarls Barkley
- **"I Am Not My Hair" – India.Arie**
- "Irreplaceable" – Beyoncé
- "Save Room" – John Legend

==== Outstanding Album ====
- B'Day – Beyoncé
- Corinne Bailey Rae – Corinne Bailey Rae
- **Dreamgirls (Soundtrack) – Various**
- Once Again – John Legend
- Reflections: A Retrospective – Mary J. Blige

=== Literary Categories ===
==== Outstanding Literary Work – Fiction ====
- After – Marita Golden
- All Aunt Hager’s Children – Edward P. Jones
- **Baby Brother's Blues – Pearl Cleage**
- Fortunate Son: A Novel – Walter Mosley
- Wizard of the Crow – Ngũgĩ wa Thiong'o

==== Outstanding Literary Work – Non-Fiction ====
- **The Audacity of Hope: Thoughts on Reclaiming the American Dream – Barack Obama**
- Come Hell or High Water: Hurricane Katrina and the Color of Disaster – Michael Eric Dyson
- The Covenant With Black America – Tavis Smiley
- Forty Million Dollar Slaves: The Rise, Fall, and Redemption of the Black Athlete – William C. Rhoden
- Not In My Family: AIDS in the African American Community – Gil Robertson IV

==== Outstanding Literary Work – Debut Author ====
- A Dead Man Speaks – Lisa Jones Johnson
- Boldfaced Lies – Charlene A. Porter
- The Legend of Quito Road – Dwight Fryer
- Letters to a Young Brother – Hill Harper
- Uncloudy Days: The Gospel Music Encyclopedia – Bil Carpenter

==== Outstanding Literary Work – Biography/Auto-Biography ====
- Before the Legend: The Rise of Bob Marley – Christopher John Farley
- Jim Brown: The Fierce Life of an American Hero – Mike Freeman
- Jokes My Father Never Taught Me – Rain Pryor
- **The Pursuit of Happyness – Chris Gardner**
- Unbowed – Wangari Maathai

==== Outstanding Literary Work – Instructional ====
- **Mama Made The Difference – T. D. Jakes**
- The Mocha Manual To a Fabulous Pregnancy – Kimberly Allers
- Shine – Star Jones Reynolds
- Skinny Cooks Can’t Be Trusted – Mo'Nique Imes Jackson
- Southern Homecoming Traditions: Recipes And Remembrances – Carolyn Quick Tillery

==== Outstanding Literary Work – Poetry ====
- **Celebrations: Rituals of Peace and Prayer – Maya Angelou**
- Check the Rhyme: An Anthology of Female Poets & Emcees – DuEwa M. Frazier
- Hoops – Major Jackson
- Jazz – Walter Dean Myers
- We Speak Your Names – Pearl Cleag

==== Outstanding Literary Work – Children ====
- Dear Mr. Rosenwald – Carole Boston Weatherford
- I Like You But I Love Me – Lonnie Lynn
- **Moses: When Harriet Tubman Led Her People to Freedom – Carole Boston Weatherford**
- Nobody Gonna Turn Me’Round – Doreen Rappaport
- Whoopi’s Big Book of Manners – Whoopi Goldberg

==== Outstanding Literary Work – Youth/Teens ====
- Copper Sun – Sharon M. Draper
- Freedom Walkers: The Story of the Montgomery Bus Boycott – Russell Freedman
- **Letters to a Young Brother – Hill Harper**
- Maya Angelou – Donna Brown Agins
- Superwoman's Child – J. L. Woodson

=== Motion Pictures ===
==== Outstanding Motion Picture ====
- **Akeelah and the Bee**
- Blood Diamond
- Catch a Fire
- Dreamgirls
- The Pursuit of Happyness

==== Outstanding Independent or Foreign Film ====
- Curse of the Golden Flower
- Days of Glory (Indigènes)
- **An Inconvenient Truth**
- Tsotsi
- Volver

==== Outstanding Actor in a Motion Picture ====
- Denzel Washington – Inside Man
- **Forest Whitaker – The Last King of Scotland**
- Jamie Foxx – Dreamgirls
- Laurence Fishburne – Akeelah and the Bee
- Will Smith – The Pursuit of Happyness

==== Outstanding Actress in a Motion Picture ====
- Beyoncé Knowles – Dreamgirls
- **Keke Palmer – Akeelah and the Bee**
- Penélope Cruz – Volver
- Queen Latifah – Last Holiday
- Sanaa Lathan – Something New

==== Outstanding Supporting Actor in a Motion Picture ====
- Danny Glover – Dreamgirls
- **Djimon Hounsou – Blood Diamond**
- Eddie Murphy – Dreamgirls
- Harry Belafonte – Bobby
- Jaden Christopher Syre Smith – The Pursuit of Happyness

==== Outstanding Supporting Actress in a Motion Picture ====
- Angela Bassett – Akeelah and the Bee
- Anika Noni Rose – Dreamgirls
- **Jennifer Hudson – Dreamgirls**
- Kerry Washington - The Last King of Scotland
- Thandie Newton – The Pursuit of Happyness

=== Directing ===
==== Outstanding Directing in a Comedy Series ====
- Ali LeRoi – Everybody Hates Chris ("Everybody Hates Elections")
- **Ken Whittingham – The Office ("Michael's Birthday")**
- Lauren Breiting – According to Jim ("The Stick")
- Millicent Shelton – Everybody Hates Chris ("Everybody Hates Valentine's Day")
- Salim Akil – Girlfriends ("The Game")

==== Outstanding Directing in a Dramatic Series ====
- Anthony Hemingway – Close to Home ("Prodigal Son")
- Craig Ross Jr. – Bones ("Aliens in a Spaceship"
- **Karen Gaviola – Lost ("The Whole Truth")**
- Paris Barclay – Cold Case ("Saving Sammy")
- Seith Mann – The Wire ("Homerooms")

==== Outstanding Directing in a Feature Film/Television Movie - Comedy or Drama ====
- Alejandro González Iñárritu – Babel
- Chris Robinson – ATL
- Sanaa Hamri – Something New
- **Spike Lee – Inside Man**
- Tyler Perry – Madea's Family Reunion

=== Writing ===
==== Outstanding Writing in a Comedy Series ====
- Kenny Smith – The Game ("The Trey Wiggs Episode")
- Mara Brock Akil – Girlfriends ("After the Storm")
- Regina Y. Hicks – Girlfriends ("I’ll Have a Blueline Christmas")
- Royale Watkins – All Of Us ("The -N- Word")
- **Silvio Horta – Ugly Betty ("Pilot")**

==== Outstanding Writing in a Dramatic Series ====
- Aaron Rahsaan Thomas – Friday Night Lights ("Full Hearts")
- Janine Sherman-Barrois – ER ("Darfur")
- Naren Chankar – CSI: Crime Scene Investigation ("Killer")
- **Shonda Rhimes – Grey’s Anatomy ("It's the End of the World")**
- Steven Maeda – Day Break ("What if He Lets Her Go")

==== Outstanding Writing in a Feature Film/Television Movie - Comedy or Drama ====
- Dianne Houston – Take the Lead
- **Doug Atchison – Akeelah and the Bee**
- Keith Glover – Life is Not a Fairytale: The Fantasia Barrino Story
- Reggie Gaskins – Restraining Order
- Tyler Perry – Madea's Family Reunion

== Special awards ==
The following recipients received distinguished awards by the NAACP for their contributions to arts, civil rights, news, and humanitarian efforts.

=== Hall of Fame Award ===
- Bill Cosby

=== Chairman's Award ===
- Bono

=== President's Award ===
- Soledad O'Brien
