= Rodney Van Johnson =

American actor

- Born: February 20, 1961 (age 65); Cincinnati, Ohio, U.S.
- Occupation: Actor
- Years active: 1994–present

Rodney Van Johnson (born February 20, 1961, in Cincinnati, Ohio) is an American actor known for portraying the role of T.C. Russell on the daytime soap opera Passions.

== Career ==
Prior to joining Passions, Johnson played Sebastian Dupree on the now-defunct ABC soap opera Port Charles in 1999. He also portrayed Trey Stark on the CBS soap opera The Young and the Restless from 1998 to 1999. He also starred as First Lieutenant Wendell McCray on the syndicated series Pensacola: Wings of Gold from 1997–1998.

== Filmography ==
=== Film ===
Year	Title	Role	Notes
1994	Dominic's Castle	Dominic	
1996	Making the Rules	Rod	
2021	The Magic	Paul Abbott	
2022	Holiday Hideaway	Martin	
TBA	Black Girl Erupted	Donald Cole Esq.	

=== Television ===
Year	Title	Role	Notes
1996	Grace Under Fire	Traffic Cop	Episode: "Road to Nowhere"
1997	The Jamie Foxx Show	Adam	Episode: "I Do, I Didn't"
1997–1998	Pensacola: Wings of Gold	Cipher	22 episodes
1998	Mad About You	Park Ranger	Episode: "There's a Puma in the Kitchen"
1998–2000	The Young and the Restless	Trey Stark	23 episodes
1999	Port Charles	Sebastian Dupre	32 episodes
1999–2007	Passions	T.C. Russell	89 episodes
2000	Girlfriends	Marcus Stokes	2 episodes
2002	Providence	T.C. Russell	Episode: "The Eleventh Hour"
2008	Without a Trace	Duffy	Episode: "Rewind"
2019	One Fine Christmas	Bob	Television film
2021	Lace	Barrington McCullough	2 episodes
2022	Kym	Mike / The Comedian	2 episodes
2023	The Bold and the Beautiful	Attorney Russell	3 episodes
