= Amelia Marshall =

American actress (born 1958)

- Born: April 2, 1958 (age 68); Albany, Georgia, U.S.
- Education: The University of Texas at Austin
- Occupation: Actress
- Years active: 1983–present
- Known for: Liz Sanbourne on Passions; Gillian "Gilly" Grant Speakes on Guiding Light
- Children: 1

Amelia Marshall (born April 2, 1958) is an American actress. She is best known for playing the roles of Gilly Grant Speakes on the CBS soap opera Guiding Light (1989 to 1996), Belinda Keefer on the ABC soap opera All My Children, (1996 to 1999), and Liz Sanbourne on the NBC soap opera Passions (2001 to 2007).

== Early life ==
Marshall was born in Albany, Georgia and lived in Atlanta, Georgia and Amityville, New York before her family settled in Houston, Texas. Her mother was a math teacher and her father was an executive for a large insurance company. She has an older sister and a younger brother. She was named after her great-aunt.

A friend talked Marshall into trying out for the vocal department at the Kinder High School for the Performing and Visual Arts in Houston. Even though she had little training, she auditioned at age thirteen by singing "Ave Maria." She was accepted and decided to take Survey of Dance as an elective. She studied with the Houston Ballet and was a member of the Houston Jazz Ballet Company. She enrolled at The University of Texas at Austin, earning a bachelor's degree in business administration. Marshall was a cheerleader in college. After graduation, she worked as a telephone repair supervisor for Southwestern Bell for two years. She learned how to repair telephones and climb telephone poles.

== Career ==
While working for Southwestern Bell, Marshall danced with a regional company at night. She auditioned for a professional theater company in Fort Worth and won a role. For the next seven years, she made a living in theater. Her early credits include roles on Broadway in Porgy and Bess (1983), Harrigan 'n Hart (1985), and Big Deal (1986).

Marshall appeared as a dancer in Robert Klein on Broadway, a 1986 special. She performed at the Kennedy Center in Duke Ellington's Queenie Pie, and at the Houston Grand Opera in Scott Joplin's Treemonisha. She also performed in national tours of Cats and West Side Story.

Marshall played Miranda on the ABC soap opera One Life to Live in 1984. The role was supposed to be long term, but the show experienced backstage turnover when Paul Rauch was hired as executive producer. Marshall was written out after two weeks.

She was cast as Gillian "Gilly" Grant Speakes on the CBS soap opera Guiding Light in 1989. Marshall worked as a day player on the show for more than a year before she was put on contract. She was the second African American actor to receive a contract role on Guiding Light (her co-star, Vince Williams, was the first). Marshall was dismissed from the series, last airing in July 1996. She said she was let go because of changes in the show's writing staff and a lack of interest in writing for Gilly.

She was cast on All My Children as Belinda Keefer in September 1996, replacing Kim Hawthorne. She was released from the show in July 1999. Fans were outraged by her dismissal.

In 1997, she starred Off-Broadway, playing Diane Gardner in Minor Demons at the Century Center for the Performing Arts.

On September 27, 2001, Marshall made her first appearance on Passions in the role of the villainess Liz Sanbourne, sister of Dr. Eve Russell. Marshall was on contract for four and a half years, until she was dismissed from the soap in July 2007 as a result of budget cuts.

In 2001 and 2002, she appeared in the films Stuart Little 2 and According to Spencer. On television, she guest-starred on Lizzie McGuire and The District.

== Personal life ==
She married Daryl Waters on November 28, 1992, at St. Paul's Chapel on the campus of Columbia University. They dated for five years prior to getting married. They divorced in 1995.

Marshall married Kent Schaffer in 1997 and they divorced in 2001. They have a son, who was born in January 1998.

== Filmography ==
=== Film ===
Year	Title	Role	Notes
2001	According to Spencer	Gloria	
2002	Stuart Little 2	Will's Mom	
2015	Babysitter	Vice Principal	

=== Television ===
Year	Title	Role	Notes
1984	One Life to Live	Miranda	
1989-1996	Guiding Light	Gilly Grant Speakes	Contract role
1996-1999	All My Children	Belinda Keefer	Contract role
2001	Lizzie McGuire	Mrs. Miller	Episode: "Between a Rock and a Bra Place"
2001	The District	Dr. Janis Jeffers	Episode: "Fools Russian: Part 1"
2001	Strong Medicine	Olivia Butler	Episode: "Zol Zein Gezint"
2001-2007	Passions	Liz Sanbourne	Contract role
