= Tracey Ross =

American television actress

- Born: Linda Tracey Ross; February 27, 1959 (age 67); Brooklyn, New York, U.S.
- Education: Dwight Morrow High School
- Alma mater: Douglass College
- Occupation: Actress
- Years active: 1981–present
- Known for: Eve Russell on Passions; Diana Douglas on Ryan's Hope
- Spouse(s): Kashif (m. 1988; div. 1988)
- Partner: Brad Johnson (c. 1986 – 1988)
- Children: Bryce Vine

Linda Tracey Ross (born February 27, 1959) is an American television actress, known for her role as Eve Russell on the NBC daytime soap opera, Passions (1999–2008).

== Early life and education ==
Ross was born in Brooklyn, New York, and attended Dwight Morrow High School in Englewood, New Jersey and then Douglass College.

== Career ==
In 1974, Ross's victory in the Miss Black Teen-Ager of New Jersey contest helped launch her modeling career, which received a further boost from her 1978 win in L'Oreal's Look of Radiance contest. In 1984, she became the first winner in the Spokesmodel category on the television series Star Search, and the National Association of Theatre Owners named her "Star of the Future". She later joined the cast of ABC daytime soap opera Ryan's Hope as Diana Douglas, appearing in show from 1985 to 1987. She later had a number of guest starring roles on prime time shows, such as The Cosby Show, Roc, Baywatch Nights, and Providence.

From 1999 to 2008, Ross starred as Eve Russell on the NBC daytime soap opera, Passions. Ross was nominated for the NAACP Image Award for Outstanding Actress in a Daytime Drama Series for nine consecutive years, for her performance as Eve Russell. Ross won the award on March 2, 2007.

== Personal life ==
During the mid-1980s Ross was in a relationship with Manhattan restaurateur Brad Johnson, with whom she had her only child, a son, rapper and singer Bryce Vine, born Bryce Christian Ross-Johnson in June 1988. That same month, Ross was one of four African-American “celebrity singles"—the others being Patti Austin, Kashif, and Freddie Jackson—featured in Ebony magazine, where they "shar[ed] their secrets for living happily alone." Six months later, two of the four, namely Kashif and Ross (who had briefly dated in 1984), became husband and wife, reportedly on or very near the former's 42nd birthday, December 26.

== Filmography ==
Year	Title	Role	Notes
1981	Jacqueline Susann's Valley of the Dolls		Television film
1984	Best Defense	Arab Girl	
1984	The Cotton Club	Dancer	
1985	Finder of Lost Loves	Secretary	Episode: "Deadly Silence"
1985	Braker	Janice	Television film
1985–1987	Ryan's Hope	Diana Douglas	Series regular
1987	Mayflower Madam	Annabelle	Television film
1989	The Cosby Show	Fran	Episode: "Getting to Know You"
1991	Doctor Doctor	Rachel Patton	Episode: "Butterfield's Complaint"
1991	Lies of the Twins	Lillian Roth	Television film
1991	Roc	Wife	Episode: "A Home, a Loan"
1994	On Our Own	Mrs. Kisling	Episode: "Parents' Night"
1996	Baywatch Nights	Celia	Episode: "Curse of the Mirrored Box"
1996	Small Time	Verneile	
1997	Cold Around the Heart	Nurse	
1999–2008	Passions	Eve Russell	Series regular
1999	Unconditional Love	Patrice Sommers	
2002	Providence	Dr. Eve Johnson Russell	Episode: "The Eleventh Hour"
2008	House of Payne	Mrs. Carter	Episode: "Payne and Prejudice"
2009	Brothers	Chris	Episode: "Mom at Bar/Train Buddy"
2014	Steps of Faith	Stephanie Houston	
