= List of fictional doctors =

This is a list of fictional doctors (characters that use the appellation "doctor", medical and otherwise), from literature, films, television, and other media.

Shakespeare created a doctor in his play Macbeth (c 1603) with a "great many good doctors" having appeared in literature by the 1890s and, in the early 1900s, the "rage for novel characters" included a number of "lady doctors". Solomon Posen had collected a list of books with "a doctors as a principal figure" which he says resulted in a list of over 10,000 works as of 2005.

Early cinematic and television representations of doctors typically characterized the practice of medicine as being "in safe (male) hands," with 90% of doctors on television through 1989 being male.

== Literature ==
Novel or literary work	Fictional doctor(s)	Author
And Then There Were None	Dr. Edward George Armstrong	Agatha Christie
The Andromeda Strain	Dr. Charles Burton; Dr. Mark Hall; Dr. Peter Leavitt; Dr. Jeremy Stone	Michael Crichton
Arrowsmith	Dr. Martin Arrowsmith	Sinclair Lewis
Aubrey–Maturin series	Dr. Stephen Maturin	Patrick O'Brian
Bert Diaries	Emilia Ridderfjell's parents	Anders Jacobsson and Sören Olsson
Breakheart Pass	Dr. Molyneaux	Alistair MacLean
A Burnt-Out Case	Dr. Colin	Graham Greene
Candide	Dr. Pangloss	Voltaire
Catch-22	Dr. "Doc" Daneeka	Joseph Heller
Chromosome 6	Dr. Jack Stapleton	Robin Cook
The Circus of Dr. Lao	Dr. Lao	Charles G. Finney
The Citadel	Dr. Andrew Manson	A. J. Cronin
Contagion	Dr. Jack Stapleton	Robin Cook
Crisis	Dr. Jack Stapleton	Robin Cook
Critical	Dr. Jack Stapleton	Robin Cook
The Dead Zone	Dr. Sam Weizak	Stephen King
Discworld	Dr. John "Mossy" Lawn	Terry Pratchett
Dr. Futurity	Dr. Jim Parsons	Philip K. Dick
The Doctor's Dilemma	Doctor Blenkinsop	George Bernard Shaw
Doctor Glas	Dr. Glas	Hjalmar Söderberg
Dr. Heidegger's Experiment	Dr. Heidegger	Nathaniel Hawthorne
The Doctor is Sick	Dr. Edwin Spindrift	Anthony Burgess
Dr. Mabuse, der Spieler	Dr. Mabuse	Norbert Jacques
Doctor Syn: A Tale of the Romney Marsh and other Dr. Syn novels	Dr. Christopher Syn	Russell Thorndike
Doctor Zhivago	Dr. Yuri Zhivago	Boris Pasternak
Dracula	Dr. Abraham Van Helsing; Dr. John Seward	Bram Stoker
Dune	Dr. Wellington Yueh	Frank Herbert
Fear and Loathing in Las Vegas	Dr. Gonzo (honorary)	Hunter S. Thompson
Frankenstein; or, The Modern Prometheus	Dr. Victor Frankenstein	Mary Shelley
The Great Gatsby	Dr. T.J. Eckleburg	F. Scott Fitzgerald
Herbert West–Reanimator	Dr. Herbert West	H. P. Lovecraft
The House of Dr. Edwardes	Dr. Anthony Edwardes; Dr. Constance Peterson	Hilary A. Saunders
The Insidious Dr Fu Manchu	Dr. Fu Manchu; Dr Petrie	Sax Rohmer
The Island of Dr. Moreau	Dr. Moreau	H. G. Wells
Journey to the End of the Night	Dr. Ferdinand Bardamu	Louis-Ferdinand Céline
Jurassic Park	Dr. Henry Wu	Michael Crichton
Looking Backward, 2000-1887	Dr. Leete	Edward Bellamy
Macbeth	Doctor	William Shakespeare
Madame Bovary	Charles Bovary	Gustave Flaubert
Marker	Dr. Jack Stapleton	Robin Cook
Middlemarch	Dr. Tertius Lydgate	George Eliot
Murder on the Orient Express	Dr. Constantine	Agatha Christie
Naked Lunch	Benway	William S. Burroughs
Necropolis	Dr. Horace Couchman	Basil Copper
The Patchwork Girl of Oz and other OZ books	Dr. Pipt	L. Frank Baum
Paper Towns	Dr. Jefferson Jefferson	John Green
Phantoms	Dr. Timothy Flyte; Dr. Jennifer Paige	Dean Koontz
The Plague	Dr. Bernard Rieux	Albert Camus
Professor Bernhardi	Professor Bernhardi, and Doctor Wenger	Arthur Schnitzler
Pygmalion	Dr. Henry Higgins	George Bernard Shaw
The Seagull	Dorn	Anton Chekhov
The Silence of the Lambs	Dr. Hannibal Lecter	Thomas Harris
The Story of Doctor Dolittle: Being the History of His Peculiar Life at Home and Astonishing Adventures in Foreign Parts Never Before Printed	Dr. John Dolittle	Hugh Lofting
The Strange Case of Dr. Jekyll and Mr. Hyde	Dr. Henry Jekyll; Dr. Hastie Lanyon	Robert Louis Stevenson
A Series of Unfortunate Events	Dr. Montgomery Montgomery	Lemony Snicket
A Study in Scarlet and other Sherlock Holmes stories	Dr. John H. Watson	Arthur Conan Doyle
Southern Victory Series	Dr. Leonard O'Doull	Harry Turtledove
Tender is the Night	Dick Diver	F. Scott Fitzgerald
The Tragical History of Doctor Faustus	Dr. Faustus	Christopher Marlowe
Treasure Island	Dr. David Livesey	Robert Louis Stevenson
Uncle Vanya	Astrov	Anton Chekhov
Vector	Dr. Jack Stapleton	Robin Cook
Water Margin	An Daoquan	Shi Nai'an
Women of the Otherworld (novel)	Dr. Clayton Danvers	Kelley Armstrong
Wicked: The Life and Times of the Wicked Witch of the West	Dr. Dillamond	Gregory Maguire
A Young Doctor's Notebook	Dr. Vladimir "Nika" Bomgard	Mikhail Bulgakov
4:50 from Paddington	Dr. John Quimper	Agatha Christie

== Film ==
Film	Fictional doctor	Actor
7 Faces of Dr. Lao	Dr. Lao	Tony Randall
A Day at the Races	Dr. Hugo Z. Hackenbush; Dr. Leopold X. Steinberg	Groucho Marx; Sig Ruman
Abbott and Costello Meet Frankenstein	Dr. Sandra Mornay; Dr. Stevens	Lenore Aubert; Charles Bradstreet
The Abominable Dr. Phibes; Dr. Phibes Rises Again	Dr. Anton Phibes	Vincent Price
The Adventures of Buckaroo Banzai Across the 8th Dimension	Dr. Buckaroo Banzai; Dr. Emilio Lizardo; Dr. Sidney Zweibel/New Jersey	Peter Weller; John Lithgow; Jeff Goldblum
Agnes of God	Dr. Martha Livingston	Jane Fonda
Airplane!	Dr. Rumack	Leslie Nielsen
Alone in the Dark (1982)	Dr. Leo Bain; Dr. Dan Potter	Donald Pleasence; Dwight Schultz
Altered States	Dr. Edward Jessup	William Hurt
The Amazing Spider-Man	Dr. Curtis Connors	Rhys Ifans
An American Werewolf in London	Dr. J.S. Hirsch	John Woodvine
Analyze This	Dr. Ben Sobel	Billy Crystal
Another Woman	Dr. Ken Post	Ian Holm
Anything Else	Dr. Phil Reed	David Conrad
Arachnophobia	Dr. James Atherton; Dr. Ross Jennings; Dr. Sam Metcalf	Julian Sands; Jeff Daniels; Henry Jones
Arrowsmith	Dr. Martin Arrowsmith; Dr. Max Gottlieb; Dr. Tubbs	Ronald Colman; A. E. Anson; Claude King
Article 99	Dr. Rudy Bobrick; Dr. Henry Dreyfoos; Dr. Sid Handleman; Dr. Leo Krutz; Dr. Peter Morgan; Dr. Richard Sturgess; Dr. Robin Van Dorn; Dr. Diana Walton	John C. McGinley; John Mahoney; Forest Whitaker; Jeffrey Tambor; Kiefer Sutherland; Ray Liotta; Lea Thompson; Kathy Baker
Austin Powers series	Dr. Evil	Mike Myers
Awake	Dr. Jack Harper; Dr. Jonathan Neyer; Dr. Puttnam	Terrence Howard; Arliss Howard; Fisher Stevens
Awakenings	Dr. Kaufman; Dr. Malcolm Sayer	John Heard; Robin Williams
Back to the Future	Dr. Emmett Brown	Christopher Lloyd
Bad Medicine	Dr. Miguel Cervantes; Dr. Ramón Madera; Dr. Gerald Marx	Manuel Pereiro; Alan Arkin; Bill Macy
Batman & Robin	Dr. Victor Fries; Dr. Pamela Isley	Arnold Schwarzenegger; Uma Thurman
Batman Begins	Dr. Jonathan Crane; Dr. Thomas Wayne	Cillian Murphy; Linus Roache
Beautiful Dreamer	Dr. Kessler	James Denton
The Bells of St. Mary's	Dr. McKay	Rhys Williams
The Birth of a Nation	Dr. Cameron	Spottiswoode Aitken
The Big Chill	Dr. Sarah Cooper	Glenn Close
The Black Cat (1934)	Dr. Vitus Werdegast	Béla Lugosi
The Black Cat (1941)	Dr. Williams	Erville Alderson
The Black Hole	Dr. Alex Durant; Dr. Kate McRae; Dr. Hans Reinhardt	Anthony Perkins; Yvette Mimieux; Maximilian Schell
The Body	Dr. Sharon Golban	Olivia Williams
The Body Snatcher	Dr. Wolfe MacFarlane	Henry Daniell
Body Chemistry	Dr. Claire Archer; Dr. Pritchard	Lisa Pescia; Joseph Campanella
Boxing Helena	Dr. Lawrence Augustine; Dr. Nick Cavanaugh	Art Garfunkel; Julian Sands
Brain Dead	Dr. Rex Martin	Bill Pullman
Bride of Frankenstein	Dr. Henry Frankenstein; Dr. Pretorius	Colin Clive; Ernest Thesiger
The Cabinet of Dr. Caligari	Dr. Caligari	Werner Krauss
Calling Dr. Kildare	Dr. Leonard Gillespie; Dr. James Kildare	Lionel Barrymore; Lew Ayres
The Cannonball Run	Dr. Nikolas Van Helsing	Jack Elam
Captain Blood	Dr. Peter Blood	Errol Flynn
Carousel	Dr. Seldon	Gene Lockhart
Carry On Doctor	Dr. Kenneth Tinkle	Kenneth Williams
Carry On Screaming	Dr. Orlando Watt; Dr. Fettle	Kenneth Williams; Jon Pertwee
Cat People; The Seventh Victim	Dr. Louis Judd	Tom Conway
The Cider House Rules	Dr. Wilbur Larch	Michael Caine
Color of Night	Dr. Bill Capa; Dr. Bob Moore	Bruce Willis; Scott Bakula
Coma	Dr. Mark Bellows; Dr. George; Dr. Harris; Dr. Marcus; Dr. Morelind; Dr. Susan Wheeler	Michael Douglas; Rip Torn; Richard Widmark; Alan Haufrect; Hari Rhodes; Geneviève Bujold
Crimes at the Dark House	Dr. Isidor Fosco	Hay Petrie
Critical Care	Dr. Werner Ernst	James Spader
Gross Anatomy	Dr. Banks	Robert Desiderio
Darkman	Dr. Peyton Westlake	Liam Neeson
Dark Victory	Dr. Frederick Steele; Dr. Parsons; Dr. Carter; Dr. Driscoll	George Brent; Henry Travers; Charles Richman; Herbert Rawlinson
The Day After Tomorrow	Dr. Lucy Hall	Sela Ward
Day of the Dead	Dr. Logan	Richard Liberty
The Devil's Backbone	Dr. Casares	Federico Luppi
Dirty Dancing	Dr. Jake Houseman	Jerry Orbach
Doc Hollywood	Dr. Halberstrom; Dr. Aurelius Hogue; Dr. Benjamin Stone	George Hamilton; Barnard Hughes; Michael J. Fox
Doc Savage: The Man of Bronze	Dr. Clark "Doc" Savage, Jr.	Ron Ely
Doctor Bull	Dr. George Bull; Dr. Verney	Will Rogers; Ralph Morgan
The Doctor	Dr. Leslie Abbott; Dr. Eli Blumfield; Dr. Murray Kaplan; Dr. Jack MacKee	Wendy Crewson; Adam Arkin; Mandy Patinkin; William Hurt
Dracula	Dr. Abraham Van Helsing; Dr. John Seward	Edward Van Sloan; Herbert Bunston
Dracula's Daughter	Dr. Jeffrey Garth; Dr. Abraham Von Helsing	Otto Kruger; Edward Van Sloan
Dr. Giggles	Dr. Chamberlain; Dr. Evan Rendell	John Vickery; Larry Drake
Dr. Goldfoot and the Bikini Machine; Dr. Goldfoot and the Girl Bombs	Dr. Goldfoot	Vincent Price
Dr. Hackenstein	Dr. Hackenstein	David Muir
Doctor Jack	Dr. Jackson; Dr. Ludwig von Saulsbourg	Harold Lloyd; Eric Mayne
Dr. Jekyll and Mr. Hyde	Dr. Henry Jekyll; Dr. Hastie Lygate	Fredric March; Holmes Herbert
Dr. Kildare's Strange Case	Dr. James Kildare	Lew Ayres
Dr. Mabuse the Gambler	Dr. Mabuse	Rudolf Klein-Rogge
Dr. No	Dr. Julius No	Joseph Wiseman
Dr. Renault's Secret	Dr. Larry Forbes; Dr. Robert Renault	Shepperd Strudwick; George Zucco
Close Your Eyes	Dr. Michael Strother	Goran Višnjić
Doctor Strange	Dr. Stephen Strange	Benedict Cumberbatch
Dr. Strangelove or: How I Learned to Stop Worrying and Love the Bomb	Dr. Strangelove	Peter Sellers
Doctor Syn; The Scarecrow of Romney Marsh	Dr. Christopher Syn	George Arliss; Patrick McGoohan
Dr. Who and the Daleks; Daleks - Invasion Earth 2150 AD	Dr. Who	Peter Cushing
Doctor X	Dr. Xavier	Lionel Atwill
Doctor Zhivago	Dr. Yuri Zhivago	Omar Sharif
Dragonwyck	Dr. Jeff Turner	Glenn Langan
Dreamscape	Dr. Paul Novotny	Max von Sydow
Dune	Dr. Wellington Yueh	Dean Stockwell
Everything You Always Wanted to Know About Sex* (* But Were Afraid to Ask)	Dr. Bernardo; Dr. Doug Ross	John Carradine; Gene Wilder
The Evil That Men Do	Dr. Hector Lomelin; Dr. Clement Molloch	José Ferrer; Joseph Maher
Evolution	Dr. Ira Kane; Dr. Allison Reed; Dr. Harry Block	David Duchovny; Julianne Moore; Orlando Jones
Extreme Measures	Dr. Judith Gruszynski; Dr. Guy Luthan; Dr. Jeffrey Manko; Dr. Lawrence Myrick	Debra Monk; Hugh Grant; Paul Guilfoyle; Gene Hackman
Eyes Wide Shut	Dr. William 'Bill' Harford	Tom Cruise
Field of Dreams	Dr. Archibald "Moonlight" Graham	Burt Lancaster
Final Analysis	Dr. Isaac Barr	Richard Gere
Flash Gordon	Dr. Hans Zarkov	Chaim Topol
Forbidden Planet	Dr. Edward Morbius; Dr. "Doc" Ostrow	Walter Pidgeon; Warren Stevens
Frankenstein	Dr. Henry Frankenstein; Dr. Waldman	Colin Clive; Edward Van Sloan
Frankenstein Meets the Wolfman	Dr. Mannering	Patric Knowles
The Fugitive	Dr. Richard Kimble	Harrison Ford
Garden of Heaven	Dr. Choi Oh-sung	Ahn Jae-wook
Garfield: The Movie; Garfield: A Tail of Two Kitties	Dr. Elizabeth "Liz" Wilson	Jennifer Love Hewitt
Ghost Town	Dr. Bertram Pincus; Dr. Prashar	Ricky Gervais; Aasif Mandvi
Ghostbusters	Dr. Egon Spengler; Dr. Raymond Stantz; Dr. Peter Venkman	Harold Ramis; Dan Aykroyd; Bill Murray
The Ghost of Frankenstein	Dr. Ludwig Frankenstein; Dr. Theodore Bohmer; Dr. Kettering	Cedric Hardwicke; Lionel Atwill; Barton Yarborough
Gone With the Wind	Dr. Meade	Harry Davenport
Gravity	Dr. Ryan Stone	Sandra Bullock
Guess Who's Coming to Dinner	Dr. John Wade Prentice	Sidney Poitier
Halloween	Dr. Samuel Loomis	Donald Pleasence
Halloween: The Curse of Michael Myers	Dr. Terence Wynn	Mitchell Ryan
The Hangover	Dr. Stuart Price	Ed Helms
Hangover Square	Dr. Allan Middleton	George Sanders
Harold & Kumar Go to White Castle	Dr. Patel; Dr. Saikat Patel; Dr. Willoughby	Errol Sitahal; Shaun Majumder; Fred Willard
Harvey	Dr. Lyman Sanderson; Dr. William Chumley	Charles Drake; Cecil Kellaway
Hope Springs	Dr. Bernard Feld	Steve Carell
Horror Hospital	Dr. Christian Storm	Michael Gough
The Hospital	Dr. Herbert "Herb" Bock; Dr. Brubaker; Dr. Ronald Casey; Dr. Joe Einhorn; Dr. Milton Mead; Dr. Howard Schaefer; Dr. John Sundstrom; Dr. Welbeck	George C. Scott; Robert Walden; Richard Hamilton; David Hooks; Donald Harron; Lenny Baker; Stephen Elliott; Richard Dysart
House of Dracula	Dr. Franz Edlemann	Onslow Stevens
The House of Fear	Dr. Simon Merivale	Paul Cavanagh
House of Frankenstein	Dr. Gustav Niemann; Dr. Geissler	Boris Karloff; Brandon Hurst
House of 1000 Corpses and The Devil's Rejects	Dr. S. Quentin Quale (Dr. Satan)	Walter Phelan
The Hound of the Baskervilles	Dr. James Mortimer	Lionel Atwill
The Howling	Dr. George Waggner	Patrick Macnee
The Hunt for Red October	Dr. Yevgeniy Petrov	Tim Curry
Idiocracy	Dr. Lexus	Justin Long
Independence Day	Dr. Brackish Okun	Brent Spiner
Internes Can't Take Money	Dr. Henry J. Fearson; Dr. Jones; Dr. James Kildare; Dr. Riley	Pierre Watkin; Steve Pendleton; Joel McCrea; Anthony Nace
Invasion of the Body Snatchers (1956)	Dr. Miles Bennell; Dr. Dan Kauffman	Kevin McCarthy; Larry Gates
Invasion of the Body Snatchers (1978)	Dr. David Kibner; Dr. Geoffrey Howell, DDS; Dr. Miles J. Bennell; Dr. Boccardo	Leonard Nimoy; Art Hindle; Kevin McCarthy; Garry Goodrow
The Invisible Man	Dr. Jack Griffin; Dr. Arthur Kemp; Dr. Cranley	Claude Rains; William Harrigan; Henry Travers
The Invisible Man Returns	Dr. Frank Griffin	John Sutton
The Invisible Man's Revenge	Dr. Peter Drury	John Carradine
The Island	Dr. Merrick	Sean Bean
Island of Lost Souls	Dr. Moreau	Charles Laughton
Jacob's Ladder	Louis	Danny Aiello
John Q	Dr. Ellen Klein; Dr. Raymond Turner	Larissa Laskin; James Woods
Junior	Dr. Larry Arbogast; Dr. Alex Hesse; Dr. Diana Reddin	Danny DeVito; Arnold Schwarzenegger; Emma Thompson
Just like Heaven	Dr. Elizabeth Masterson	Reese Witherspoon
K-PAX	Dr. Mark Powell; Dr. Claudia Villars; Dr. Chakraborty; Dr. Steve Becker; Dr. Duncan Flynn; Dr. David Patel; Dr. Stuart Hessler	Jeff Bridges; Alfre Woodard; Ajay Naidu; Brian Howe; Peter Maloney; Lance E. Nichols; Paul Linke
The Kentucky Fried Movie	Dr. Klahn	Bong Soo Han
To Kill a Mockingbird	Dr. Reynolds	Hugh Sanders
The Last King of Scotland	Dr. Nicholas Garrigan	James McAvoy
The Last Man on Earth	Dr. Robert Morgan	Vincent Price
Leave Her to Heaven	Dr. Mason; Dr. Saunders	Gene Lockhart; Reed Hadley
Logan's Run	Doc	Michael Anderson, Jr.
Lorenzo's Oil	Dr. Judalon	Gerry Bamman
Magnificent Obsession	Dr. Bob Merrick	Rock Hudson
The Man Who Knew Too Much	Dr. Benjamin McKenna	James Stewart
The Man Who Laughs	Dr. Hardquanonne	George Siegmann
Marathon Man	Dr. Christian Szell	Laurence Olivier
M*A*S*H	Dr. Henry Blake; Dr. Frank Burns; Dr. Oliver Harmon "Spearchucker" Jones; Dr. "Trapper" John Francis Xavier McIntyre; Dr. Benjamin Franklin "Hawkeye" Pierce	Roger Bowen; Robert Duvall; Fred Williamson; Elliott Gould; Donald Sutherland
The Mask	Dr. Newman	Ben Stein
Master and Commander: The Far Side of the World	Dr. Stephen Maturin	Paul Bettany
Medicine Man	Dr. Robert Campbell; Dr. Rae Crane; Dr. Miguel Ornega	Sean Connery; Lorraine Bracco; José Wilker
Meet Me in St. Louis	Dr. Girard	Donald Curtis
Men in Black (film)	Dr. Laurel Weaver	Linda Fiorentino
Metropolis	Dr. C. A. Rotwang	Rudolf Klein-Rogge
Miracle on 34th Street	Dr. Pierce; Dr. Rogers; Dr. Granville Sawyer	James Seay; William Forrest; Porter Hall
Monster-in-Law	Dr. Kevin Fields	Michael Vartan
Monsters vs Aliens	Dr. Cockroach	Hugh Laurie
Murder, My Sweet	Dr. Sonderborg	Ralf Harolde
Murder on the Orient Express	Dr. Constantine	George Coulouris
Murders in the Rue Morgue	Dr. Mirakle	Béla Lugosi
The Mask of Fu Manchu	Dr. Fu Manchu; Dr. Von Berg	Boris Karloff; Jean Hersholt
The Mummy	Dr. Muller	Edward Van Sloan
Netherbeast Incorporated	Dr. Myron Berman	John Schile
Nights in Rodanthe	Dr. Paul Flanner	Richard Gere
Nine Months	Dr. Kosevich	Robin Williams
No Love for Johnnie	Dr. West	Michael Goodliffe
Nurse Betty	Dr. David Ravell; Dr. Lonnie Walsh	Greg Kinnear; Laird Macintosh
One Flew Over the Cuckoo's Nest	Dr. John Spivey	Dean Brooks
Open Range	Dr. "Doc" Barlow	Dean McDermott
Ordinary People	Dr. Tyrone Berger	Judd Hirsch
Pan's Labyrinth	Dr. Ferreiro	Alex Angulo
The Pearl of Death	Dr. Julien Boncourt	John Merkyl
Phenomenon	Dr. Brunder; Dr. Bob Niedorf; Dr. Wellin	Robert Duvall; Brent Spiner; Richard Kiley
The Pig, the Snake and the Pigeon	Dr. Chang Kuei-ching; Dr. Chao	Cherry Hsieh; Cheng Yu-Chieh
Pitch Perfect	Dr. Mitchell	John Benjamin Hickey
Planet of the Apes	Dr. Galen; Dr. Zira; Dr. Zaius; Dr. Honorious; Dr. Maximus	Wright King; Kim Hunter; Maurice Evans; James Daly; Woodrow Parfrey
Playing God	Dr. Eugene Sands	David Duchovny
Prancer	Dr. Orel Benton	Abe Vigoda
Psycho	Dr. Fred Richmond	Simon Oakland
Raiders of the Lost Ark and other releases in the Indiana Jones series of films	Dr. Henry "Indiana" Jones, Jr. Dr. Henry Jones, Sr.	Harrison Ford; Sean Connery
Rasputin and the Empress	Dr. Remezov	Edward Arnold
The Raven	Dr. Richard Vallon; Dr. Jerry Holden	Béla Lugosi; Lester Matthews
Rebecca	Dr. Baker	Leo G. Carroll
The Relic	Dr. Margo Green; Dr. Ann Cuthbert; Dr. Albert Frock; Dr. Greg Lee; Dr. Zwiezic	Penelope Ann Miller; Linda Hunt; James Whitmore; Chi Moui Lo; Audra Lindley
The Resident	Dr. Juliet Devereau	Hilary Swank
Return to Oz	Dr. J.B. Worley	Nicol Williamson
RoboCop 2	Dr. Juliette Faxx	Belinda Bauer
The Rocky Horror Picture Show	Dr. Frank-N-Furter; Dr. Everett V. Scott	Tim Curry; Jonathan Adams
The Santa Clause 3: The Escape Clause	Dr. Hismus	Charlie Stewart
Saving Grace	Dr. Martin Bamford	Martin Clunes
Saw; Saw III	Dr. Lawrence Gordon; Dr. Lynn Denlon	Cary Elwes; Bahar Soomekh
The Secret Life of Walter Mitty	Dr. Hugo Hollingshead	Boris Karloff
The Secret of Dr. Kildare	Dr. James Kildare	Lew Ayres
Seducing Doctor Lewis	Dr. Christopher Lewis	David Boutin
Serial Mom	Dr. Eugene Sutphin	Sam Waterston
Sherlock Holmes	Dr. John H. Watson	Jude Law
Sherlock Holmes: A Game of Shadows	Dr. John H. Watson	Jude Law
Sherlock Holmes and the Secret Weapon	Dr. Franz Tobel; Dr. Frederick Hoffner	William Post Jr. Henry Victor
Sherlock Holmes Faces Death	Dr. Bob Sexton	Arthur Margetson
Shock Treatment	Dr. Cosmo McKinley; Dr. Nation McKinley	Richard O'Brien; Patricia Quinn
The Shootist	Dr. E.W. Hostetler	James Stewart
Side Effects	Dr. Jonathan Banks	Jude Law
Silence of the Lambs	Dr. Hannibal Lecter; Dr. Frederick Chilton	Anthony Hopkins; Anthony Heald
The Sisters	Dr. Chebrin; Dr. Harry Glass	Rip Torn; Steven Culp
The Sixth Sense	Dr. Malcolm Crowe	Bruce Willis
Skippy	Dr. Herbert Skinner	Willard Robertson
Something's Gotta Give	Dr. Julian Mercer	Keanu Reeves
Son of Dracula	Dr. Harry Brewster	Frank Craven
Son of Frankenstein	Dr. Wolf Frankenstein	Basil Rathbone
Sons of the Desert	Dr. Horace Meddick	Lucien Littlefield
Spellbound	Dr. Alexander "Alex" Brulov; Dr. Anthony Edwardes; Dr. Constance Petersen	Michael Chekhov; Gregory Peck; Ingrid Bergman
Spider-Man 2	Dr. Otto Octavius	Alfred Molina
Stagecoach	Dr. "Doc" Boone	Thomas Mitchell
Star Trek film series	Dr. Christine Chapel; Dr. Beverly Crusher; EMH Program AK-1 (The Doctor); Dr. Leonard McCoy; Dr. Carol Marcus; Dr. David Marcus; Dr. Tolian Soran	Majel Barrett; Gates McFadden; Robert Picardo; DeForest Kelley/Karl Urban; Bibi Besch/Alice Eve; Merritt Butrick; Malcolm McDowell
Sunchaser	Dr. Michael Reynolds; Dr. Bradford	Woody Harrelson; Richard Bauer
The Thing	Dr. Blair; Dr. Copper	Wilford Brimley; Richard Dysart
The Thin Man Goes Home	Dr. Bertram Charles	Harry Davenport
The Third Man	Dr. Winkel	Erich Ponto
The Time of Their Lives	Dr. Ralph Greenway	Bud Abbott
Trauma	Dr. Judd; Dr. Lloyd	Frederic Forrest; Brad Dourif
Twelve Monkeys	Dr. Fletcher; Dr. Goines; Dr. Peters; Dr. Kathryn Railly	Frank Gorshin; Christopher Plummer; David Morse; Madeleine Stowe
Twilight	Dr. Carlisle Cullen	Peter Facinelli
Under Capricorn	Dr. Macallister	G.H. Mulcaster
Waitress	Dr. Jim Pomatter	Nathan Fillion
The Walking Dead	Dr. Evan Beaumont	Edmund Gwenn
The War of the Worlds	Dr. Clayton Forrester	Gene Barry
The Wedding Planner	Dr. Steven James	Matthew McConaughey
Werewolf of London	Dr. Wilfred Glendon; Dr. Yogami	Henry Hull; Warner Oland
Who Is Killing the Great Chefs of Europe?	Dr. Deere	John Le Mesurier
Who Killed Lamb?	Doctor Robson	Anthony Roye
The Wolf Man	Dr. Lloyd	Warren William
The Woman in Green	Dr. Onslow	Frederick Worlock
X-Men	Dr. Charles Xavier	Patrick Stewart
The World Is Not Enough	Dr. Christmas Jones	Denise Richards
Young Doctors in Love	Dr. Simon August; Dr. Stephanie Brody; Dr. Phil Burns; Dr. Milton Chamberlain; Dr. Bucky DeVol; Dr. Thurman Flicker; Dr. Charles Litto; Dr. Oliver Ludwig; Dr. Joseph Prang; Dr. Walter Rist	Michael McKean; Sean Young; Taylor Negron; Gary Friedkin; Ted McGinley; Rick Overton; Kyle T. Heffner; Harry Dean Stanton; Dabney Coleman; Patrick Collins
Young Dr. Kildare	Dr. Walter P. Carew; Dr. Leonard Gillespie; Dr. James Kildare; Dr. Stephen Kildare; Dr. Lane-Porteus	Walter Kingsford; Lionel Barrymore; Lew Ayres; Samuel S. Hinds; Monty Woolley
Young Frankenstein	Dr. Frederick Frankenstein	Gene Wilder
2010	Dr. Walter Curnow; Dr. Heywood R. Floyd	John Lithgow; Roy Scheider

== Television ==
=== A-B ===
Program	Fictional doctor	Actor
All My Children	Dr. Angie Baxter; Dr. David Hayward; Dr. Jonathan Kinder; Dr. Greg Madden; Dr. Josh Madden #1 #2; Dr. Jake Martin#1 #2; Dr. Jeff Martin #1 #2; Dr. Joe Martin; Dr. Maria Santos; Dr. Julia Santos Keefer; Dr. David Thornton; Dr. Charles Tyler; Dr. Cliff Warner	Debbi Morgan; Vincent Irizarry; Michael Sabatino; Ian Buchanan; Scott Kinworthy; Colin Egglesfield; Michael Lowry; J. Eddie Peck; Charles Frank; John James; Ray MacDonnell; Eva LaRue Callahan; Sydney Penny; Paul Gleason; Hugh Franklin; Peter Bergman
All Saints	Dr. Luciano "Luke" Forlano; Dr. Peter Morrison; Dr. Mitchell "Mitch" Stevens; Dr. Kylie Preece; Dr. Charlotte Beaumont; Dr. Vincent Hughes; Dr. Jack Quade; Dr. Frank Campion; Dr. Sean Everleigh; Dr. Bartholomew "Bart" West; Dr. Miklos "Mike" Vlasek; Dr. Zoe Gallagher; Dr. Steven "Steve" Taylor; Dr. Adam Rossi; Dr. Elliott Parker	Martin Lynes; Andrew McKaige; Erik Thomson; Ling-Hsueh Tang; Tammy MacIntosh; Christopher Gabardi; Wil Traval; John Howard; Chris Vance; Andrew Supanz; John Waters; Allison Cratchley; Jack Campbell; Kip Gamblin; Jonathan Wood
American Horror Story: Asylum	Dr. Arthur Arden; Dr. Oliver Thredson	James Cromwell; Zachary Quinto
Animal Practice	Dr. George Coleman; Dr. Doug Jackson; Dr. Jill Leiter; Dr. Robert Yamamoto	Justin Kirk; Tyler Labine; June Diane Raphael; Bobby Lee
Another World	Dr. Jamie Frame #1 #2 #3 #4 #5 #6 #7 #8; Dr. John Hudson; Dr. Kelsey Harrison	Seth Holzlein; Aiden McNulty; Tyler Mead; Brad Bedford; Robert Doran; Tim Holcomb; Richard Bekins; Laurence Lau; David Forsyth; Kaitlin Hopkins
Arrested Development	Dr. Wordsmith	Ian Roberts
Babylon 5	Dr. Stephen Franklin; Dr. Benjamin Kyle	Richard Biggs; Johnny Sekka
Bad Girls	Dr. Malcolm Nicholson; Dr. Thomas Waugh; Dr. Rowan Dunlop	Philip McGough; Michael Higgs; Colin Salmon
Battlestar Galactica (1978); Battlestar Galactica (2003)	Dr. Salik; Dr. Gaius Baltar; Dr. Cottle	George Murdock; James Callis; Donnelly Rhodes
Becker	Dr. John Becker	Ted Danson
Bel Ami	Doctor	Geoffrey Lewis
Ben Casey	Dr. Ben Casey; Dr. Daniel Niles Freeland; Dr. David Zorba	Vince Edwards; Franchot Tone; Sam Jaffe
The Beverly Hillbillies	Granny Clampett (mountain folk doctor); Dr. Roy Clyburn	Irene Ryan; Fred Clark
Beverly Hills, 90210	Dr. Peter Tucker	James C. Victor
Bewitched	Dr. Bombay	Bernard Fox
The Big Bang Theory	Dr. Sheldon Cooper; Dr. Eric Gablehauser; Dr. Leonard Hofstadter; Dr. Rajesh Koothrappali; Dr. Leslie Winkle; Dr. Bernadette Rostenkowski; Dr. Amy Farrah Fowler; Dr. Stephanie Barnett	Jim Parsons; Mark Harelik; Johnny Galecki; Kunal Nayyar; Sara Gilbert; Melissa Rauch; Mayim Bialik; Sara Rue
Blood Ties	Dr. Rajani Mohadevan	Nimet Kanji
The Bob Newhart Show	Dr. Robert "Bob" Hartley; Dr. Jerry Robinson	Bob Newhart; Peter Bonerz
Bodies	Dr. Maya Dutta; Dr. Polly Grey; Dr. Roger Hurley; Dr. Rob Lake; Dr. Maria Orton; Dr. Tim Sibley; Dr. Tony Whitman	Preeya Kalidas; Tamzin Malleson; Patrick Baladi; Max Beesley; Susan Lynch; Simon Lowe; Keith Allen
The Bold Ones: The New Doctors	Dr. David Craig; Dr. Amanda Fallon; Dr. Ben Gold; Dr. Gomrick; Dr. Paul Hunter; Dr. Ted Stuart	E. G. Marshall; Jane Wyman; Pat Hingle; John S. Ragin; David Hartman; John Saxon
Bones	Dr. Zack Addy; Dr. Temperance Brennan; Dr. Daniel Goodman; Dr. Jack Hodgins; Dr. Camille Saroyan; Dr. Lance Sweets	Eric Millegan; Emily Deschanel; Jonathan Adams; T. J. Thyne; Tamara Taylor; John Francis Daley
Bramwell	Dr. Eleanor Bramwell; Dr. Robert Bramwell	Jemma Redgrave; David Calder
Buck Rogers in the 25th Century	Dr. Goodfellow; Dr. Elias Huer; Dr. Theopolis	Wilfrid Hyde-White; Tim O'Connor; Eric Server (voice)

=== C-D ===
Program	Fictional doctor	Actor
Captain Kremmen	Dr. Heinrich von Gitfinger	Kenny Everett
Cardiac Arrest	Dr. Monica Broome; Dr. Andrew Collin; Dr. Claire Maitland; Dr. Rajesh Rajah	Pooky Quesnel; Andrew Lancel; Helen Baxendale; Ahsen Bhatti
Cheers	Dr. Frasier Winslow Crane; Dr. Lilith Sternin	Kelsey Grammer; Bebe Neuwirth
Chicago Fire	Dr. Hallie Thomas	Teri Reeves
Chicago Hope	Dr. Francesca Alberghetti; Dr. Kate Austin; Dr. Lisa Catera; Dr. Jeffrey Geiger; Dr. Angela Giandamenicio; Dr. Diane Grad; Dr. Dennis Hancock; Dr. Jeremy Hanlon; Dr. Billy Kronk; Dr. Jack McNeil; Dr. Danny Nyland; Dr. Gina Simon; Dr. Aaron Shutt; Dr. John Sutton; Dr. Arthur Thurmond; Dr. Phillip Watters; Dr. Keith Wilkes; Dr. Robert Yeates	Barbara Hershey; Christine Lahti; Stacy Edwards; Mandy Patinkin; Roma Maffia; Jayne Brook; Vondie Curtis-Hall; Lauren Holly; Peter Berg; Mark Harmon; Thomas Gibson; Carla Gugino; Adam Arkin; Jamey Sheridan; E.G. Marshall; Hector Elizondo; Rocky Carroll; Eric Stoltz
Chicago Story	Dr. Judith Bergstrom; Dr. Max Carson; Dr. Jeff House	Maud Adams; Kristoffer Tabori; Kene Holliday
Childrens Hospital	Dr. Cat Black; Dr. Brian; Dr. Blake Downs; Dr. Valerie Flame; Dr. Ed Helms; Dr. Owen Maestro; Dr. Jason Mantzoukas; Dr. Glenn Richie; Dr. Nate Schacter; Dr. Lola Spratt; Dr. Max Von Sydow	Lake Bell; Jordan Peele; Rob Corddry; Malin Åkerman; Ed Helms; Rob Huebel; Nate Corddry; Ken Marino; Seth Morris; Erinn Hayes; John Ross Bowie
China Beach	Dr. Gerard Bernard; Dr. Dee; Dr. Dick Richard; Dr. Colleen Flaherty Richards; Dr. Singer	Derek de Lint; Richard Green; Robert Picardo; Colleen Flynn; Scott Jaeck
Chuck	Dr. Fred Hornblower; Dr. Ellie Woodcomb; Dr. Devon Woodcomb	Todd Sherry; Sarah Lancaster; Ryan McPartlin
City of Angels	Dr. Nate Ambrose; Dr. Damon Bradley; Dr. Ethan Carter; Dr. Courtney Ellis; Dr. Arthur Jackson; Dr. Gwen Pennington; Dr. Lillian Price; Dr. Dan Prince; Dr. Raleigh Stewart; Dr. Ana Syphax; Dr. Ben Turner; Dr. Geoffrey Weiss; Dr. Wesley Williams	Gregory Alan Williams; Bokeem Woodbine; Ron Canada; Gabrielle Union; T. E. Russell; Sandi Schultz; Vivica A. Fox; Robert Foxworth; Kyle Secor; Tamara Taylor; Blair Underwood; Phil Buckman; Hill Harper
City Hospital	Dr. Barton Crane; Dr. Kate Morrow	Mel Ruick; Anne Burr
Code Black	Dr. Rollie Guthrie; Dr. Neal Hudson; Dr. Leanne Rorish; Dr. Mark Taylor	William Allen Young; Raza Jaffrey; Marcia Gay Harden; Kevin Dunn
The Colbert Report	Dr. Stephen T. Colbert, D.F.A. (honorary)	Stephen Colbert
The Cosby Show	Dr. Heathcliff "Cliff" Huxtable	Bill Cosby
Criminal Minds	Dr. Spencer Reid	Matthew Gray Gubler
Crossing Jordan	Dr. Garret Macy; Dr. Nigel Townsend; Dr. Peter Winslow; Dr. Miles Marks	Miguel Ferrer; Steve Valentine; Ivan Sergei; Mark Moses
Crusade	Dr. Sara Chambers	Marjean Holden
CSI: Crime Scene Investigation	Dr. Gilbert "Gil" Grissom; Dr. Albert "Al" Robbins; Dr. Leigh Sapien	William Petersen; Robert David Hall; Brenda Strong
CSI: Miami	Dr. Marshall; Dr. Alexx Woods; Dr. Tara Price; Dr. Tom Loman	John Newton; Khandi Alexander; Megalyn Echikunwoke; Christian Clemenson
CSI: NY	Dr. Keith Beaumont; Dr. Peyton Driscoll; Dr. Sid Hammerback; Dr. Spencer Howard; Dr. Sheldon Hawkes	Joel Gretsch; Claire Forlani; Robert Joy; Laird Macintosh; Hill Harper
Curb Your Enthusiasm	Dr. Shaffer; Dr. Shiela Flomm; Dr. Lionel Templeton	Seth Morris; Brenda Strong; Bryan Cranston
Daktari	Dr. Marsh Tracy	Marshall Thompson
Dark Shadows	Dr. Peter Guthrie; Dr. Julia Hoffman; Dr. Eric Lange; Dr. Ian Reade; Dr. Dave Woodward #1 #2 #3	John Lasell; Grayson Hall; Addison Powell; Alfred Hinckley; Richard Woods; Robert Gerringer; Peter Turgeon
Days of Our Lives	Dr. Karen Bader; Dr. Lexie Carver; Dr. Marlena Evans; Dr. Tom Horton; Dr. Mike Horton #1 #2	Tammy Tavares; Renée Jones; Deidre Hall; Macdonald Carey; Michael T. Weiss; Roark Critchlow
Desperate Housewives	Dr. Rex Van de Kamp; Dr. Adam Mayfair; Dr. Lee Craig; Dr. Jane Carlson; Dr. Alex Cominis; Dr. Samuel Heller; Dr. Ron McCready	Steven Culp; Nathan Fillion; Terry Bozeman; Andrea Parker; Todd Grinnell; Stephen Spinella; Jay Harrington
Diagnosis: Murder	Dr. Amanda Bentley; Dr. Jack Parker; Dr. Mark Sloan; Dr. Jack Stewart; Dr. Jesse Travis	Victoria Rowell; Stephen Caffrey; Dick Van Dyke; Scott Baio; Charlie Schlatter
The Dick Van Dyke Show	Dr. Jerry Helper	Jerry Paris
Doc	Dr. Clint Cassidy; Dr. Oliver Crane; Dr. Derek Hubert	Billy Ray Cyrus; Ron Lea; Derek McGrath
Doc Martin	Dr. Martin Ellingham	Martin Clunes
Doctors	See: List of Doctors characters	
Doctor Doctor	Dr. Dierdre Bennett; Dr. Abraham Butterfield; Dr. Grant Linowitz; Dr. Mike Stratford	Maureen Mueller; Julius Carry; Beau Gravitte; Matt Frewer
Dr. Finlay's Casebook	Dr. Cameron; Dr. Finlay; Dr. Snoddy	Andrew Cruickshank; Bill Simpson; Eric Woodburn
Dr. Vegas	Dr. Billy Grant	Rob Lowe
Doctors' Hospital	Dr. Anson Brooks; Dr. Chaffey; Dr. Danvers; Dr. Jake Goodwin; Dr. Paul Herman; Dr. Felipe Ortega; Dr. Norah Purcell	James Almanzar; Russell Martin; John Pleshette; George Peppard; John Larroquette; Victor Campos; Zohra Lampert
Dr. Katz, Professional Therapist	Dr. Jonathan Katz	Jonathan Katz
Dr. Kildare	Dr. Yates Atkinson; Dr. Maxwell Becker; Dr. Jeff Brenner; Dr. Vincent Brill; Dr. Demerest; Dr. Rudy Devereux; Dr. Phillip Downey; Dr. Leonard Gillespie; Dr. Roger Helvick; Dr. James Kildare; Dr. Carl Noyes; Dr. Milton Orliff; Dr. Lou Rush; Dr. Wickens	James T. Callahan; James Mason; Bruce Hyde; Mart Hulswit; Barry Atwater; Dean Stockwell; Dan O'Herlihy; Raymond Massey; Andrew Prine; Richard Chamberlain; William Shatner; Martin Balsam; James Earl Jones; Philip Bourneuf
Dr. Quinn, Medicine Woman	Dr. Michaela "Mike" Quinn	Jane Seymour
Doctor Who & Torchwood	The Doctor - First Doctor; Second Doctor; Third Doctor; Fourth Doctor; Fifth Doctor; Sixth Doctor; Seventh Doctor; Eighth Doctor; War Doctor; Ninth Doctor; Tenth Doctor; Eleventh Doctor; Twelfth Doctor; Thirteenth Doctor; Fugitive Doctor; Fourteenth Doctor; Fifteenth Doctor; Dr. Harry Sullivan; Dr. Liz Shaw; Dr. Grace Holloway; Dr. Owen Harper; Dr. Martha Jones; Dr. Toshiko Sato; Dr. River Song	William Hartnell; Patrick Troughton; Jon Pertwee; Tom Baker; Peter Davison; Colin Baker; Sylvester McCoy; Paul McGann; John Hurt; Christopher Eccleston; David Tennant; Matt Smith; Peter Capaldi; Jodie Whittaker; Jo Martin; David Tennant; Ncuti Gatwa; Ian Marter; Caroline John; Daphne Ashbrook; Burn Gorman; Freema Agyeman; Naoko Mori; Alex Kingston
Doogie Howser, M.D.	Dr. Canfield; Dr. David Howser; Dr. Douglas "Doogie" Howser; Dr. Jack McGuire; Dr. Pinkley; Dr. Ron Welch	Lawrence Pressman; James Sikking; Neil Patrick Harris; Mitchell Anderson; Susan Krebs; Rif Hutton
Downton Abbey	Dr. Richard Clarkson; Sir Philip Tapsell	David Robb; Tim Pigott-Smith

=== E-F ===
Program	Fictional doctor	Actor
EastEnders	Dr. Harold Legg; Dr. Jaggat Singh; Dr. David Samuels; Dr. Fred Fonseca; Dr. Johnathon Leroy; Dr. Oliver Cousins; Dr. May Wright; Dr. Anthony Trueman; Dr. Poppy Merritt; Dr. Al Jenkins; Dr. Yusef Khan; Dr. Ash Panesar	Leonard Fenton; Amerjit Deu; Christopher Reich; Jimi Mistry; Tom Ellis; Ivan Kaye; Amanda Drew; Nicholas Bailey; Amy Darcy; Adam Croasdell; Ace Bhatti; Gurlaine Kaur Garcha
Elementary	Dr. Joan Watson	Lucy Liu
Emergency!	Dr. Kelly Brackett; Dr. Joe Early; Dr. Mike Morton	Robert Fuller; Bobby Troup; Ron Pinkard
Emergency - Ward 10	Dr. Alan "Digger" Dawson	Bud Tingwell
Empty Nest & The Golden Girls	Dr. Harry Weston	Richard Mulligan
ER	Dr. Donald Anspaugh; Dr. Alexander Babcock; Dr. Ray Barnett; Dr. Peter Benton; Dr. Charles Cameron; Dr. John Carter; Dr. Jing-Mei "Deb" Chen; Dr. Janet Coburn; Dr. David "Div" Cvetic; Dr. Victor Clemente; Dr. Elizabeth Corday; Dr. Anna Del Amico; Dr. Carl Deraad; Dr. Maggie Doyle; Dr. Lucien Dubenko; Dr. Dale Edson; Dr. Cleo Finch; Dr. Greg Fischer; Dr. Steve Flint; Dr. Michael Gallant; Dr. Dennis Gant; Dr. Tony Gates; Dr. Mark Greene; Dr. Angela Hicks; Dr. Jack Kayson; Dr. Abby Keaton; Dr. Luka Kovač; Dr. Gabriel Lawrence; Dr. Kim Legaspi; Dr. Susan Lewis; Dr. Abby Lockhart; Dr. Dave Malucci; Dr. Paul Meyers; Dr. David Morgenstern; Dr. Archie Morris; Dr. Nina Pomerantz; Dr. Greg Pratt; Dr. Neela Rasgotra; Dr. Robert 'Rocket' Romano; Dr. Doug Ross; Dr. William "Wild Willy" Swift; Dr. John "Tag" Taglieri; Dr. Harper Tracy; Dr. Carl Vucelich; Dr. Kerry Weaver; Dr. Ellis West	John Aylward; David Brisbin; Shane West; Eriq La Salle; Steven Culp; Noah Wyle; Ming-Na; Amy Aquino; John Terry; John Leguizamo; Alex Kingston; Maria Bello; John Doman; Jorja Fox; Leland Orser; Matthew Glave; Michael Michele; Harry J. Lennix; Scott Jaeck; Sharif Atkins; Omar Epps; John Stamos; Anthony Edwards; C.C.H. Pounder; Sam Anderson; Glenne Headly; Goran Višnjić; Alan Alda; Elizabeth Mitchell; Sherry Stringfield; Maura Tierney; Erik Palladino; Michael Buchman Silver; William H. Macy; Scott Grimes; Jami Gertz; Mekhi Phifer; Parminder Nagra; Paul McCrane; George Clooney; Michael Ironside; Rick Rossovich; Christine Elise; Ron Rifkin; Laura Innes; Clancy Brown
E/R	Dr. Thomas Esquivel; Dr. Ravi Raja; Dr. Howard Sheinfeld; Dr. Eve Sheridan #1 #2	Luis Avalos; Henry Polic II; Elliott Gould; Marcia Strassman; Mary McDonnell
Everwood	Dr. Harold "Hal" Abbott, Jr. Dr. Linda Abbott; Dr. Andrew "Andy" Brown; Dr. Henry Validor	Tom Amandes; Marcia Cross; Treat Williams; Patrick Fabian
The Fall and Rise of Reginald Perrin	Dr. Morrisey	John Horsley
Family Guy	Dr. Elmer Hartman	Seth MacFarlane (voice)
Farscape	Utu-Noranti Pralatong (herbalist); Pa'u Zotoh Zhaan (spiritual healer)	Melissa Jaffer; Virginia Hey
Firefly	Dr. Simon Tam	Sean Maher
The Flash (2014 TV series)	Dr. Caitlin Snow; Dr. Harrison Wells	Danielle Panabaker; Tom Cavanagh
The Flying Doctors	Dr. Tom Callaghan; Dr. Chris Randall; Dr. Geoff Standish	Andrew McFarlane; Liz Burch; Robert Grubb
Forever Knight	Dr. Natalie Lambert	Catherine Disher
Frasier	Dr. Frasier Crane; Dr. Hester Crane; Dr. Niles Crane; Dr. Lilith Sternin	Kelsey Grammer; Rita Wilson; David Hyde Pierce; Bebe Neuwirth
Freaks and Geeks	Dr. Vic Schweiber	Sam McMurray
Friends	Dr. Richard Burke; Dr. Timothy Burke; Dr. Ross Geller; Dr. Leonard Green; Dr. Benjamin Hobart; Dr. Drake Ramoray	Tom Selleck; Michael Vartan; David Schwimmer; Ron Leibman; Greg Kinnear; Matt LeBlanc
Friends with Benefits	Dr. Everett Lonsdale	Brian McNamara
Fringe	Dr. Walter Bishop	John Noble
Frontier Doctor	Dr. Bill Baxter	Rex Allen
The Fugitive; The Fugitive (remake)	Dr. Richard Kimble	David Janssen; Tim Daly
Futurama	Dr. Hubert J. Farnsworth; Dr. Ogden Wernstrom; Dr. Amy Wong; Dr. John Zoidberg	Billy West (voice); David Herman (voice); Lauren Tom (voice); Billy West (voice)

=== G-L ===
Program	Fictional doctor	Actor
General Hospital	Dr. Rachel Adair; Dr. Tracy Adams; Dr. Addison; Dr. Dean Arnold; Dr. Bob Ayres; Dr. Alex Baker; Dr. Gail Adamson Baldwin; Dr. Tom Baldwin, Jr. Dr. Tom Baldwin, Sr. #1 #2; Dr. Michael Baranski; Dr. Walt Benson; Dr. Yasmine Bernoudi; Dr. Borden; Dr. Borez; Dr. Kyle Bradley; Dr. Arthur Bradshaw; Dr. Phil Brewer #1 #2 #3 #4; Dr. Ellen Burgess; Dr.Ellen Cahill; Dr.Mason Caldwell; Dr.Campbell; Dr. Yank Chung; Dr. Ryan Chamberlain; Dr. Collins; Dr. Kevin Collins; Dr. Vivian Collins; Dr. Cunningham; Dr. Mark Dante #1 #2 #3; Dr. Harrison Davis; Dr. Noah Drake; Dr. Patrick Drake; Dr. Diane Erskin; Dr. Irma Foster; Dr. Russell Ford; Dr. Gary; Dr. Goodman; Dr. Simone Ravella Hardy #1 #2 #3; Dr. Steve Hardy; Dr. Tom Hardy #1 #2; Dr. Tommy Hardy, Jr. Dr. Gerald Henderson; Dr. James Hobart; Dr. Greta Ingstrom; Dr. James; Dr. Andrew "Frisco" Jones; Dr. Anthony "Tony" Jones; Dr. Seymour Katz; Dr. Kramer; Dr. Lane; Dr. Gary Lansing; Dr. Gina Dante Lansing #1 #2 #3; Dr. Kelly Lee #1 #2; Dr. Todd Levine; Dr. Cameron Lewis; Dr. Jake Marshak; Dr. Ken Martin; Dr. Miller; Dr. Kyle Morgan; Dr. Erna Morris; Dr. Nelson; Dr. Kevin O’Connor; Dr. Joseph Parnell Scanlon; Dr. Tony Perelli; Dr. Perry; Dr. Henry Pinkham; Dr. Porchenko; Dr. John Prentice; Dr. Alan Quartermaine, Sr. Dr. Emily Quartermaine #1 #2; Dr. Monica Quartermaine #1 #2; Dr. Julie Morris Devlin Ramsey; Dr. Pauline Ravelle; Dr. Robin Scorpio; Dr. Malcolm Rutledge; Dr. Silva; Dr. Eric Simpson; Dr. Adam Streeter; Dr. Buzz Stryker; Dr. Peter Taylor #1 #2; Dr. Tremaine; Dr. Wallace; Dr. Jeff Webber; Dr. Lesley Williams Webber; Dr. Rick Webber #1 #2; Dr. Sarah Webber #1 #2; Dr. Steven Lars Webber #2; Dr. Bunny Willis; Dr. Lainey Winters; Dr. Wyatt	Amy Grabow; Kim Hamilton; Richard Guthrie; James Emery; Yale Summers; Philip Abbott; Susan Brown; Bradley Green; Don Chastain; David Wallace; Leigh McCloskey; Corey Young; Lydie Denier; Basil Langton; Victor Mohica; Daniel Black; Martin E. Brooks; Roy Thinnes; Ron Hayes; Craig Huebing; Martin West; Debbi Morgan; Marilyn Rockafellow; Joe Michael Burke; Chris Cavy; Patrick Francis Bishop; Jon Lindstrom; Chris Bart; Jon Lindstrom; Marie Windsor; Frank Whiteman; James York; Michael Delano; Gerald Gordon; Kevin Best; Rick Springfield; Jason Thompson; Brandyn Barbara Artis; Dwan Smith; Richard Gant; Michael Ensign; Bill Bishop; Laura Carrington; Stephanie Williams; Felecia Bell; John Beradino; Christine Cahill; Matthew Ashford; Zachary Ellington; Joe DiSanti; James Sikking; Kristina Wayborn; Rosemary Forsyth; Jack Wagner; Brad Maule; Jordan Charney; Cathy Masamitsu; Suzanne Cortney; Steve Carlson; Anna Stuart; Brenda Scott; Donna Baccala; Gwendoline Yeo; Minae Noji; Craig Littler; Lane Davies; Rib Hillis; Jack Betts; Edward Platt; Grainger Hines; Angel Tompkins; Pat Renella; Kevin Bernhardt; Michael Dietz; Michael Baseleon; Gene Collins; Peter Kilman; Philip Bruns; Barry Atwater; Stuart Damon; Amber Tamblyn; Natalia Livingston; Patsy Rahn; Leslie Charleson; Lisa Ann Hadley; Norma Donaldson; Kimberly McCullough; John Denos; William Marquez; Brandon Hooper; Brett Halsey; Don Galloway; Paul Carr; Craig Huebing; William Glover; Liam Sullivan; Richard Dean Anderson; Denise Alexander; Michael Gregory; Chris Robinson; Jennifer Sky; Sarah Laine; Shaun Benson; Scott Reeves; Beau Kayser; Kent King; Al Micacchio
General Hospital: Night Shift	Dr. Andy Archer; Dr. Leo Julian	Ron Melendez; Dominic Rains
Ghost Whisperer	Dr. Jim Clancy; Dr. Rick Payne; Dr. Eli James; Dr. Forrest Morgan	David Conrad; Jay Mohr; Jamie Kennedy; Mark Moses
Gideon's Crossing	Dr. Aaron Boies; Dr. Max Cabranes; Dr. Bruce Cherry; Dr. Wyatt Cooper; Dr. Ben Gideon; Dr. Alejandra "Ollie" Klein; Dr. Michael Pirandello; Dr. Siddhartha "Sid" Shandar	Russell Hornsby; Rubén Blades; Hamish Linklater; Eric Dane; Andre Braugher; Rhona Mitra; Kevin J. O'Connor; Ravi Kapoor
Green Wing	Dr. Angela Hunter; Dr. Guy Secretan; Dr. Caroline Todd; Dr. "Mac" Macartney; Dr. Alan Statham	Sarah Alexander; Stephen Mangan; Tamsin Greig; Julian Rhind-Tutt; Mark Heap
Grey's Anatomy	Dr. Miranda Bailey; Dr. Preston Burke; Dr. Ellis Grey; Dr. Lexie Grey; Dr. Meredith Grey; Dr. Alex Karev; Dr. Oliver Lebackes; Dr. Addison Montgomery; Dr. George O'Malley; Dr. Parker; Dr. Derek Shepherd; Dr. Mark Sloan; Dr. Isobel "Izzie" Stevens; Dr. Callie Torres; Dr. Richard Webber; Dr. Wyatt; Dr. Cristina Yang; Dr. Arizona Robbins; Dr. Erica Hahn; Dr. Swender; Dr. Virginia Dixon; Dr. Owen Hunt; Dr. April Kepner; Dr. Jackson Avery	Chandra Wilson; Isaiah Washington; Kate Burton; Chyler Leigh; Ellen Pompeo; Justin Chambers; Patrick Fabian; Kate Walsh; T. R. Knight; Steven Culp; Patrick Dempsey; Eric Dane; Katherine Heigl; Sara Ramirez; James Pickens, Jr. Amy Madigan; Sandra Oh; Jessica Capshaw; Brooke Smith; Kimberly Elise; Mary McDonnell; Kevin McKidd; Sarah Drew; Jesse Williams
Guiding Light	Dr. Ed Bauer; Dr. Melissande Bauer; Dr. Rick Bauer; Dr. Michael Burke; Dr. Sonni Carrera; Dr. Eve Guthrie; Dr. Sara McIntyre; Dr. Daniel St. John; Dr. Claire Ramsey; Dr. Meredith Reade Bauer; Dr. Jim Reardon	Peter Simon; Yvonne Wright; Michael O'Leary; Peter Hermann; Michelle Forbes; Hilary Edson; Millette Alexander; David Bishins; Susan Pratt; Nicolette Goulet; Michael Woods
Gunsmoke	Dr. Galen "Doc" Adams; Dr. Charles Adams	Milburn Stone (television); Howard McNear (radio)
Hart of Dixie	Dr. Zoe Hart; Dr. Bertram "Brick" Breeland	Rachel Bilson; Tim Matheson
Having Babies aka Julie Farr, M.D.	Dr. Ron Danvers; Dr. Julie Farr; Dr. Blake Simmons	Dennis Howard; Susan Sullivan; Mitchell Ryan
Hawthorne	Dr. Tom Wakefield	Michael Vartan
Heartland	Dr. Nathaniel "Nate" Grant; Dr. Simon Griffith; Dr. Tom Jonas	Treat Williams; Chris William Martin; Rockmond Dunbar
Highlander: The Series	Dr. Anne Lindsey	Lisa Howard
Home and Away	Dr. Charlotte Adams; Dr. Rachel Armstrong; Dr. Diana Fraser; Dr. James Fraser; Dr. Lachlan Fraser; Dr. Flynn Saunders; Dr. Hugh Sullivan; Dr. Kelly Watson; Dr. Sid Walker	Stephanie Chaves-Jacobsen; Amy Mathews; Kerry McGuire; Michael Picciliri; Richard Grieve; Martin Dingle-Wall and Joel McIlroy; Rodger Corser; Katrina Hobbs; Robert Mammone
Hope & Faith	Dr. Charley Shanowski; Dr. Anne Osvath	Ted McGinley; Jaclyn Smith
House	Dr. Allison Cameron; Dr. Robert Chase; Dr. Lisa Cuddy; Dr. Eric Foreman; Dr. Gregory House; Dr. Lawrence Kutner; Dr. Brock Sterling; Dr. Chris Taub; Dr. Remy Hadley; Dr. James Wilson; Dr. Amber Volakis; Dr. Martha M. Masters; Dr. Jessica Adams; Dr. Chi Park	Jennifer Morrison; Jesse Spencer; Lisa Edelstein; Omar Epps; Hugh Laurie; Kal Penn; Jason Lewis; Peter Jacobson; Olivia Wilde; Robert Sean Leonard; Anne Dudek; Amber Tamblyn; Odette Annable; Charlyne Yi
House Calls	Dr. Charley Michaels; Dr. Norman Solomon; Dr. Amos Weatherby	Wayne Rogers; Ray Buktenica; David Wayne
I Dream of Jeannie	Dr. Alfred E. Bellows	Hayden Rorke
Inconceivable	Dr. Malcolm Bowers; Dr. Nora Campbell	Jonathan Cake; Angie Harmon
It's Always Sunny In Philadelphia	Dr. Mantis Toboggan	Danny DeVito
The Incredible Hulk	Dr. David Banner	Bill Bixby
The Interns	Dr. Peter Goldstone	Broderick Crawford
In Treatment	Dr. Paul Weston	Gabriel Byrne
Island Son	Dr. Daniel Kulani	Richard Chamberlain
Jekyll	Dr. Tom Jackman	James Nesbitt
Jericho	Dr. April Green	Darby Stanchfield
Jesse	Dr. Jeff Hanson; Dr. Danny Kozak	Dan Gauthier; Kevin Rahm
Julia	Dr. Morton Chegley	Lloyd Nolan
L. A. Doctors	Dr. Roger Cattan; Dr. Sarah Church; Dr. Tim Lonner; Dr. Evan Newman	Ken Olin; Sheryl Lee; Matt Craven; Rick Roberts
Law & Order; Law & Order: Special Victims Unit; Law & Order: Criminal Intent	Dr. Elizabeth Olivet; Dr. Elizabeth Rodgers; Dr. George Huang; Dr. Emil Skoda; Dr. Melinda Warner	Carolyn McCormick; Leslie Hendrix; B.D. Wong; J. K. Simmons; Tamara Tunie
The League	Dr. Russell Deramo; Dr. Andre Nowzik; Dr. Shivakamini Somakandakram	Rob Huebel; Paul Scheer; Janina Gavankar
Leave it to Charlie	Dr. Holliday	William Fox
Lie to Me	Dr. Jeffrey Buchanan; Dr. Gillian Foster; Dr. Cal Lightman	D.W. Moffett; Kelli Williams; Tim Roth
Little House on the Prairie	Dr. Hiram Baker	Kevin Hagen
LOST	Dr. Richard Alpert; Dr. Leslie Arzt; Dr. Juliet Burke; Dr. Ethan Rom; Dr. Christian Shephard; Dr. Jack Shephard	Nestor Carbonell; Daniel Roebuck; Elizabeth Mitchell; William Mapother; John Terry; Matthew Fox
Lost Girl	Dr. Lauren Lewis	Zoie Palmer
Lost in Space	Dr. Maureen Robinson; Dr. Zachary Smith	June Lockhart; Jonathan Harris
The Love Boat	Dr. Adam Bricker	Bernie Kopell
The Lying Game	Dr. Ted Mercer	Andy Buckley

=== M-Q ===
Program	Fictional doctor	Actor
Marcus Welby, M.D.	Dr. Steven Kiley; Dr. Marcus Welby	James Brolin; Robert Young
M*A*S*H	LTC Henry Blake; MAJ Frank Burns; MAJ Sidney Freedman; CPT B. J. Hunnicutt; CPT Oliver Harmon "Spearchucker" Jones; CPT "Trapper" John Francis Xavier McIntyre; CPT Benjamin Franklin "Hawkeye" Pierce; COL Sherman T. Potter; MAJ Charles Emerson Winchester III	McLean Stevenson; Larry Linville; Allan Arbus; Mike Farrell; Timothy Brown; Wayne Rogers; Alan Alda; Harry Morgan; David Ogden Stiers
Matt Lincoln	Dr. Matt Lincoln	Vince Edwards
Maude	Dr. Arthur Harmon	Conrad Bain
Medic	Dr. Konrad Styner	Richard Boone
Medical Center	Dr. Jeanne Bartlett; Dr. Carrie Benson; Dr. Bradford; Dr. Corelli; Dr. Courtney; Dr. Farring; Dr. Joe Gannon; Dr. De Haven; Dr. James; Dr. Arthur Komer; Dr. Paul Lochner; Dr. Bert Simon; Dr. Ben Teverley; Dr. Waltham; Dr. Carl Webson	Corinne Camacho; Jessica Walter; Martin Braddock; Robert Walden; Peter Haskell; Pat Hingle; Chad Everett; Percy Rodriguez; Georg Stanford Brown; David Opatoshu; James Daly; Jack Garner; Paul Burke; William Devane; Gary Lockwood
Medical Investigation	Dr. Stephen Connor; Dr. Natalie Durant; Dr. Miles McCabe	Neal McDonough; Kelli Williams; Christopher Gorham
Melrose Place	Dr. Kimberly Shaw; Dr. Michael Mancini; Dr. Matt Fielding; Dr. Peter Burns	Marcia Cross; Thomas Calabro; Doug Savant; Jack Wagner
Mental	Dr. Chloe Artis; Dr. Carl Belle; Dr. Jack Gallagher; Dr. Veronica Hayden-Jones; Dr. Nora Skoff; Dr. Arturo Suarez	Marisa Ramirez; Derek Webster; Chris Vance; Jacqueline McKenzie; Annabella Sciorra; Nicholas Gonzalez
Mercy	Dr. Chris Sands; Dr. Dan Harris; Dr. Joe Briggs	James Tupper; James LeGros; James Van Der Beek
Mercy Point	Dr. Batung; Dr. Dru Breslauer; Dr. Haylen Breslauer; Dr. Rema Cook; Dr. DeMilla; Dr. Caleb "C.J." Jurado; Dr. Grote Maxwell	Jordan Lund; Alexandra Wilson; Maria del Mar; Gay Thomas; Joe Spano; Brian McNamara; Joe Morton
Metalocalypse	Dr. Rockso, the Rock N Roll Clown	
The Mindy Project	Dr. Mindy Lahiri; Dr. Danny Castellano; Dr. Jeremy Reed; Dr. Peter Prentice; Dr. Paul Leotard; Dr. Marc Shulman; Dr. Jean Fishman; Dr. Tom McDougall	Mindy Kaling; Chris Messina; Ed Weeks; Adam Pally; James Franco; Stephen Tobolowsky; Niecy Nash; Bill Hader
Miranda (TV series)	Dr. Gail, a.k.a. Dr Foxy, a "foxy" doctor who is the love of Stevie, Miranda and Tilly.	
The Mob Doctor	Dr. Grace Devlin; Dr. Brett Robinson; Dr. Olivia Watson; Dr. Stafford White	Jordana Spiro; Zach Gilford; Jaime Lee Kirchner; Željko Ivanek
Monday Mornings	Dr. Harding Hooten; Dr. John Liberman; Dr. Sydney Napur; Dr. Sung Park; Dr. Tina Ridgeway; Dr. Michelle Robidaux; Dr. Buck Tierney; Dr. Jorge Villanueva; Dr. Tyler Wilson	Alfred Molina; Jonathan Silverman; Sarayu Rao; Keong Sim; Jennifer Finnigan; Emily Swallow; Bill Irwin; Ving Rhames; Jamie Bamber
Monk	Dr. Neven Bell; Dr. Charles Kroger	Héctor Elizondo; Stanley Kamel
The Muppet Show	Dr. Teeth; Dr. Bob (Veterinarians' Hospital); Dr. Bunsen Honeydew	Jim Henson; Rowlf the Dog (Jim Henson); Dave Goelz
Murdoch Mysteries	Dr. Julia Ogden	Hélène Joy
NCIS	Dr. Donald "Ducky" Mallard; Dr. Jeanne Benoit; Dr. James "Jimmy" Palmer	David McCallum; Scottie Thompson; Brian Dietzen
NCIS: New Orleans	Dr. Loretta Wade	CCH Pounder
Neighbours	Dr. Clive Gibbons; Dr. Beverly Marshall #2; Dr. Karl Kennedy; Dr. Veronica Olenski; Dr. Darcy Tyler; Dr. Peggy Newton; Dr. Demi Vinton; Dr. Doug Harris; Dr. Rhys Lawson; Dr. Martin Chambers; Dr. Jessica Girdwood	Geoff Paine; Lisa Armytage; Shaunna O'Grady; Alan Fletcher; Caroline Lloyd; Mark Raffety; Carolyn Bock; Angela Twigg; Mahesh Jadu; Ben Barber; John Wood; Glenda Linscott
New Amsterdam	Dr. Sara Dillane	Alexie Gilmore
Nip/tuck	Dr. Merril Bobolit; Dr. Quentin Costa; Dr. Sean McNamara; Dr. Barrett Moore; Dr. Erica Noughton; Dr. Christian Troy	Joey Slotnick; Bruno Campos; Dylan Walsh; Alec Baldwin; Vanessa Redgrave; Julian McMahon
The New Adventures of Old Christine	Dr. Palmer	Jason Alexander
No Ordinary Family	Dr. Stephanie Powell	Julie Benz
Northern Exposure	Dr. Phillip Capra; Dr. Joel Fleischman	Paul Provenza; Rob Morrow
Nurse Jackie	Dr. Fitch Cooper; Dr. Eleanor O'Hara	Peter Facinelli; Eve Best
One Life to Live	Dr. Jim Craig; Dr. Ben Davidson; Dr. Joshua "Josh" Hall; Dr. Peter Janssen; Dr. Ivan Kipling; Dr. Dorian Lord; Dr. Michael McBain; Dr. Ben Price; Dr. Marty Saybrooke; Dr. Mark Toland; Dr. Price Trainor; Dr. Spencer Truman; Dr. Will Vernon; Dr. Danny Wolek; Dr. Larry Wolek	Robert Milli; Mark Derwin; Laurence Fishburne; Jeff Pomerantz; Jack Betts; Nancy Pinkerton; R. Brandon Johnson; Charles Malik Whitfield; Susan Haskell; Tommy Lee Jones; Thurman Scott; Kimberlin Brown; Farley Granger; Eddie Moran; Paul Tulley
Out of Practice	Dr. Ben Barnes; Dr. Lydia Barnes; Dr. Oliver Barnes; Dr. Regina Barnes; Dr. Stewart Barnes	Christopher Gorham; Stockard Channing; Ty Burrell; Paula Marshall; Henry Winkler
Outlander	Dr. Claire Fraser	Caitriona Balfe
Parks and Recreation	Dr. Harris	Cooper Thornton
Passions	Dr. Eve Johnson Russell	Tracey Ross
Poldark	Dr. Dwight Enys	Luke Norris
Pretty Little Liars	Dr. Wren Kingston	Julian Morris
Prison Break	Dr. Sara Tancredi	Sarah Wayne Callies
Private Practice	Dr. Samuel "Sam" Bennett; Dr. Naomi Bennett; Dr. Cooper Freedman; Dr. Charlotte King; Dr. Addison Montgomery; Dr. Violet Turner; Dr. Peter "Pete" Wilder	Taye Diggs; Audra McDonald; Paul Adelstein; KaDee Strickland; Kate Walsh; Amy Brenneman; Tim Daly
Providence	Dr. Jim Hansen; Dr. Sydney "Syd" Hansen; Dr. Helen Reynolds; Dr. Jordan Roberts	Mike Farrell; Melina Kanakaredes; Leslie Silva; Steven Culp
Psych	Woody the Coroner	Kurt Fuller
The Psychiatrist	Dr. Bernard Altman; Dr. James Whitman	Luther Adler; Roy Thinnes
Quantum Leap	Dr. Sam Beckett	Scott Bakula
Quincy, M.E.	Dr. Robert Astin; Dr. Sam Fujiyama; Dr. R. Quincy	John S. Ragin; Robert Ito; Jack Klugman

=== R-Y ===
Program	Fictional doctor	Actor
Reba	Dr. Brock Hart; Dr. Todd; Dr. Morgan	Christopher Rich; Martin Mull; James Denton
Rizzoli & Isles	Dr. Maura Isles	Sasha Alexander
Sanctuary	Dr. Helen Magnus; Dr. Will Zimmerman	Amanda Tapping; Robin Dunne
Saturday Night Live	Dr. Beaman; Dr. Charles Claproth; Dr. Emory Coleman; Dr. Doug; Dr. Dowden; Dr. Flemming; Dr. Green; Dr. Griffin; Captain Doctor Rice Lake; Dr. Mark; Dr. Trent Markham; Dr. McAndrews; Dr. Leonard McCoy #1; Dr. Leonard McCoy #2; Dr. Perkins; Dr. Poop; Dr. Marshall Reames; Dr. Ted	Will Ferrell; Jon Lovitz; David Alan Grier; Kevin Nealon; Kevin Spacey; Matt Damon; Jon Lovitz; Ellen Cleghorne; Dan Aykroyd; Alec Baldwin; Phil Hartman; Julia Sweeney; Dan Aykroyd; Phil Hartman; Tim Meadows; Steve Martin; Val Kilmer; Chris Elliott
Saved	Dr. Alice Alden; Dr. Martin Cole; Dr. Fish; Dr. Daniel Lanier; Dr. Karen Thorpe	Elizabeth Reaser; David Clennon; Karin Konoval; Andrew Airlie; Heather Stephens
St. Elsewhere	Dr. Wendy Armstrong; Dr. Daniel Auschlander; Dr. Elliot Axelrod; Dr. Hugh Beale; Dr. Robert Caldwell; Dr. Annie Cavanero; Dr. Phillip Chandler; Dr. Mark Craig; Dr. Victor Ehrlich; Dr. Wayne Fiscus; Dr. John Gideon; Dr. Seth Griffin; Dr. Emily Humes; Dr. Paulette Kiem; Dr. V. J. Kochar; Dr. Cathy Martin; Dr. Jack Morrison; Dr. Carol Novino; Dr. Alan Poe; Dr. Michael Ridley; Dr. Ben Samuels; Dr. Roxanne Turner; Dr. Jaqueline Wade; Dr. Donald Westphall; Dr. Peter White	Kim Miyori; Norman Lloyd; Stephen Furst; G.W. Bailey; Mark Harmon; Cynthia Sikes; Denzel Washington; William Daniels; Ed Begley, Jr. Howie Mandel; Ronny Cox; Bruce Greenwood; Judith Hansen; France Nuyen; Kavi Raz; Barbara Whinnery; David Morse; Cindy Pickett; Brian Tochi; Paul Sand; David Birney; Alfre Woodard; Sagan Lewis; Ed Flanders; Terence Knox
Scream Queens	Dr. Brock Holt; Dr. Cassidy Cascade; Dr. Dean Cathy Munsch; Dr. Chanel Oberlin	John Stamos; Taylor Lautner; Jamie Lee Curtis; Emma Roberts
Scrubs	Dr. Seymour Beardfacé; Dr. Kim Briggs; Dr. Kevin Casey; Dr. Molly Clock; Dr. Perry Cox; Dr. John "J.D." Dorian; Dr. Keith Dudemeister; Dr. Bob Kelso; Dr. Taylor Maddox; Dr. Matthews; Dr. Walter Mickhead; Dr. Grace Miller; Dr. Doug Murphy; Dr. Todd Quinlan; Dr. Elliot Reid; Dr. Coleman "Colonel Doctor" Slawski; Dr. Jeffrey Steadman; Dr. Christopher Turk; Dr. Wen	Geoff Stevenson; Elizabeth Banks; Michael J. Fox; Heather Graham; John C. McGinley; Zach Braff; Travis Schuldt; Ken Jenkins; Courteney Cox; Jay Kenneth Johnson; Frank Encarnacao; Bellamy Young; Johnny Kastl; Robert Maschio; Sarah Chalke; Bob Bencomo; Matt Winston; Donald Faison; Charles Chun
Seinfeld	Dr. Tim Whatley; Dr. Sara Sitarides; Dr. Ben; Dr. Ben Galvant; Dr. Rick	Bryan Cranston; Marcia Cross; Richard Burgi; Bob Odenkirk; Randy Carter
Sherlock	Dr. John H. Watson	Martin Freeman
SGU Stargate Universe	Dr. Nicholas Rush	Robert Carlyle
$#*! My Dad Says	Dr. Edison Milford III	William Shatner
The Simpsons	Dr. Julius Hibbert; Dr. Marvin Monroe; Dr. Nick Riviera; Dr. Wolfe	Harry Shearer/Kevin Michael Richardson (voice); Harry Shearer (voice); Hank Azaria (voice); Hank Azaria (voice)
The Six Million Dollar Man	Dr. Rudy Wells #1 #2 #3	Martin Balsam; Alan Oppenheimer; Martin E. Brooks
The Sopranos	Dr. Bruce Cusamano; Dr. Jennifer Melfi	Robert LuPone; Lorraine Bracco
The Storm	Dr. Jonathan Kirk; Dr. Jack Hoffman	James Van Der Beek; Rich Sommer
Suburgatory	Dr. Noah Werner	Alan Tudyk
Supernatural	Dr. Sexy	Steve Bacic
Touched by an Angel	Dr. Kate Calder; Dr. Kate Marlens; Dr. Rebecca Markham; Dr. Rence Patterson	Stephanie Zimbalist; Victoria Mallory; Faye Dunaway; Steven Culp
Star Trek	Dr. Julian Bashir; Dr. Phillip Boyce; Dr. Beverly Crusher; EMH Program AK-1 (The Doctor); Dr. Leonard McCoy; Dr. Phlox; Dr. Mark Piper; Dr. Katherine Pulaski; Dr. Selar	Alexander Siddig; John Hoyt; Gates McFadden; Robert Picardo; DeForest Kelley; John Billingsley; Paul Fix; Diana Muldaur; Suzie Plakson
Stargate Atlantis	Dr. Carson Beckett; Dr. Kate Heightmeyer; Dr. Jennifer Keller; Dr. Rodney McKay; Dr. Elizabeth Weir; Dr. Radek Zelenka	Paul McGillion; Claire Rankin; Jewel Staite; David Hewlett; Torri Higginson; David Nykl
Stargate SG-1	Dr. Samantha Carter; Dr. Janet Fraiser; Dr. Daniel Jackson; Dr. Carolyn Lam; Dr. Catherine Langford; Dr. Bill Lee; Dr. Robert Rothman	Amanda Tapping; Teryl Rothery; Michael Shanks; Lexa Doig; Viveca Lindfors; Bill Dow; Jason Schombing
Strange World	Dr. Paul Turner	Tim Guinee
Strangers and Brothers	Doctor	Richard Warner
Strong Medicine	Dr. Nick Biancavilla; Dr. Andy Campbell; Dr. Luisa "Lu" Magdalena Delgado; Dr. Robert "Bob" Jackson; Dr. Dana Stowe; Dr. Kayla Thornton; Dr. Dylan West	Brennan Elliott; Patricia Richardson; Rosa Blasi; Philip Casnoff; Janine Turner; Tamera Mowry; Rick Schroder
Space: 1999	Dr. Victor Bergman; Dr. Helena Russell	Barry Morse; Barbara Bain
The Surgeon	Dr. Eve Agius; Dr. Sam Dash; Dr. Lachie Hatsatouris; Dr. Ravi Jayawardener; Dr. Abe Morris; Dr. Julian Sierson; Dr. Nick Steele	Justine Clarke; Sam Worthington; Matthew Zeremes; Chum Ehelepola; Christopher Morris; Nicholas Bell; Matthew Newton
Three Rivers	Dr. Andy Yablonski	Alex O'Loughlin
Temperatures Rising	Dr. Lloyd Axton; Dr. Vincent Campanelli; Dr. Charles Claver; Dr. Paul Mercy; Dr. Jerry Noland	Jeff Morrow; James Whitmore; John Dehner; Paul Lynde; Cleavon Little
The Time Tunnel	Dr. Ann MacGregor; Dr. Tony Newman; Dr. Doug Phillips; Dr. Raymond Swain	Lee Meriwether; James Darren; Robert Colbert; John Zaremba
Torchwood - see #C-D for combined Doctor Who & Torchwood
Trapper John, M.D.	Dr. Jacob Christmas; Dr. George Alonzo 'Gonzo' Gates; Dr. Jacob 'Jackpot' Jackson; Dr. John Francis Xavier 'Trapper' McIntyre; Dr. John 'J.T.' McIntyre; Dr. Stanley Riverside II; Dr. Charlie Nichols; Dr. David Sandler	Kip Gilman; Gregory Harrison; Brian Stokes Mitchell; Pernell Roberts; Timothy Busfield; Charles Siebert; Michael Tucci; Richard Schaal
Trauma	Dr. Joseph Saviano; Dr. Diana Van Dine	Jamey Sheridan; Scottie Thompson
In Treatment	Dr. Laura Hill	Melissa George
Twin Peaks	Dr. William Hayward; Dr. Lawrence Jacoby	Warren Frost; Russ Tamblyn
Two and a Half Men	Dr. Linda Freeman; Dr. Alan Harper; Dr. Herb Melnick; Dr. Prajneep	Jane Lynch; Jon Cryer; Ryan Stiles; Kris Iyer
Two Faces West	Dr. Rick January	Charles Bateman
Two Guys, a Girl and a Pizza Place	Dr. Howard Zwaneveld	James Denton
United States of Tara	Dr. Holden	Joel Gretsch
The Venture Bros.	Dr. Harrison Blackwood; Dr. Suzanne McCullough; Dr. Byron Orpheus; Dr. Thaddeus Venture	unknown unknown Steven Rattazzi; James Urbaniak
War of the Worlds	Dr. Harrison Blackwood; Dr. Suzanne McCullough	Jared Martin; Lynda Mason Green
The West Wing	Dr. Abigail Bartlet; Dr. Stanley Keyworth	Stockard Channing; Adam Arkin
Will & Grace	Dr. Leo Markus	Harry Connick, Jr.
WKRP in Cincinnati	Dr. Johnny Fever	Howard Hesseman
The X-Files	Dr. Dana Scully; Dr. Nancy Da Silva; Dr. Hodge; Dr. Denny Murphy	Gillian Anderson; Felicity Huffman; Xander Berkeley; Steve Hytner
Young Dr. Malone	Dr. David Malone; Dr. Jerry Malone	John Connell; William Prince

=== 1-9 ===
Program	Fictional doctor	Actor
3 lbs	Dr. Thomas Flores; Dr. Douglas Hanson; Dr. Adrienne Holland; Dr. Jonathan Seger	Armando Riesco; Stanley Tucci; Indira Varma; Mark Feuerstein
30 Rock	Dr. Leo Spaceman	Chris Parnell
7th Heaven	Dr. Matt Camden; Dr. Sarah Glass-Camden; Dr. Hank Hastings; Dr. Jonathan Sanders	Barry Watson; Sarah Danielle Madison; Ed Begley, Jr. Nick Zano

== Anime ==
Program	Fictional doctor	Voice actor
A Certain Magical Index	The Heaven Canceller	Cole Brown
Black Butler	Madam Red	Lydia Mackay
Black Jack	Black Jack	Kirk Thornton
Fruits Basket	Dr. Hatori Sohma	Kent Williams
Fullmetal Alchemist	Dr. Tim Marcoh	Brice Armstrong
Full Moon o Sagashite	Dr. Keiichi Wakaoji	Gerrick Winston
Monster	Dr. Kenzo Tenma	Liam O'Brien
Neon Genesis Evangelion	Dr. Ritsuko Akagi	Sue Ulu
One Piece	Dr. Tony Tony Chopper	Lisa Ortiz; Brina Palencia
Steamboy	Dr. Edward Steam; Dr. Lloyd Steam	Alfred Molina; Patrick Stewart
Zoids	Dr. D	Dave Pettitt
JoJo's Bizarre Adventure	Dr. Satoru Akefu (Wonder of U)	N/A

== Children's television ==
Program	Fictional doctor	Voice actor
Adventure Time	Dr. Donut; Dr. Ice Cream; Doctor Prince; Doctor Princess	Keith Ferguson; Maria Bamford; Tom Kenny; Melinda Hill
Bananaman	Dr. Gloom	Bill Oddie
Bluey	Dr. Bandit Custard Heeler	David McCormack
C.O.P.S	Dr. Badvibes	Ron Rubin
Darkwing Duck	Dr. Sarah Bellum; Dr. Reginald Bushroot; Dr. Fossil	unknown Tino Insana; Barry Gordon
Doctor Snuggles	Dr. Snuggles	Peter Ustinov
Dr. Dimensionpants	Dr. Dimensionpants (Kyle Lipton)	Samuel Vincent
G.I. Joe: A Real American Hero	Dr. Carl W. Greer, "Doc"; Dr. Mindbender	Buster Jones; Brian Cummings
H.R. Pufnstuf	Dr. Blinky	John Silver (Costume performer for character); Walker Edmiston (Voice actor for character)
Inspector Gadget	Dr. George Claw	Frank Welker
Jonny Quest	Dr. Benton C. Quest	John Stephenson; Don Messick
Kim Possible	Dr. Doctor Drakken; Dr. James Timothy Possible; Dr. Ann Possible; Dr. Vivian Francis Porter; Dr. Betty Director	John DiMaggio; Gary Cole; Jean Smart ? Felicity Huffman
The Muppet Show	Dr. Teeth; Dr. Bob (Veterinarians' Hospital); Dr. Bunsen Honeydew	Jim Henson; Rowlf the Dog (Jim Henson); Dave Goelz
Ned's Declassified School Survival Guide	Dr. Alvin Lowe; Dr. Alaistar Wright; Dr. Olga Xavier	Lusia Strus
Noonbory and the Super Seven	Doctorbory	?
Phineas and Ferb	Dr. Heinz Doofenshmirtz (not an actual doctor, bought his degree); Dr. Hirano (actual doctor)	Dan Povenmire; Ming Wen
Project G.e.e.K.e.R.	Dr. Maston	Charles Adler
Rocko's Modern Life	Dr. Paula Hutchison	Linda Wallem
Sesame Street	Dr. Gina Jefferson	Alison Bartlett-O'Reilly
Simsala Grimm	Doc Croc	Jörg Stuttmann
The Suite Life of Zack & Cody	Dr. Chip Walters	David Blue
Steven Universe	Dr. Priyanka Maheswaran	Mary Elizabeth McGlynn
Transformers	Dr. Arkeville	Casey Kasem

== Comics ==
Comic series or source	Fictional doctor	Character alter ego	Publisher
The Adventures of Tintin	Doctor Müller		Le Petit Vingtième
Alpha Flight	Manikin	Whitman Knapp	Marvel Comics
The Atom and other series	Dr. Ray Palmer	The Atom	DC Comics
Batman	Dr. Leslie Thompkins; Dr. Matthew Thorne	Crime Doctor	DC Comics
Dick Tracy	Doc (1944); Doc Hump(1934); Dr. Cyros Freezedrei (1983); Dr. Klippoff {1968} Dr. Lunquist (1944); Dr. Plain (1951); Dr. Rex (1942)		Chicago Tribune New York News Syndicate
DC vs. Marvel; Doctor Strangefate	Doctor Strangefate	Charles Xavier	Amalgam Comics (DC Comics & Marvel Comics)
Dr. Kildare	Dr. James Kildare		Dell Comics
Dr. Weird, Star-Studded Comics #1 (original appearance), multiple other series	Dr. Rex Ward	Doctor Weird	Big Bang Comics
Flash Gordon	Dr. Hans Zarkov		King Features Syndicate
Garfield	Dr. Elizabeth "Liz" Wilson		Random House
Schlock Mercenary	Dr. Edward Bunnigus; Dr. Todd "Lazarus" Lazcowicz		Self-published
Superman	Dr. Emil Hamilton; Dr. Albert Michaels	Atomic Skull	DC Comics
Tales to Astonish #27 Jan. 1962 (original appearance), multiple series including Ant-Man	Dr. Henry Pym	Ant-Man; Giant-Man; Yellowjacket	Marvel Comics
Tom Poes	Dr. Okke Zielknijper		
Tomb of Dracula	Dr. Quincy Harker; Dr. Rachel van Helsing		Marvel Comics
Weekly Shōnen Champion	Dr. Kuro Hazama	Black Jack	Akita Shoten
Assorted "Doctors" in various DC Comics titles, not found in own singular standalone title/series (or still needing info here on own singular standalone title/series or origin title)	Dr. Karl Hellfern	Doctor Death	DC Comics
Assorted "Doctors" in various DC Comics titles, not found in own singular standalone title/series (or still needing info here on own singular standalone title/series or origin title)	Dr. Simon Ecks	Doctor Double X	DC Comics
Assorted "Doctors" in various DC Comics titles, not found in own singular standalone title/series (or still needing info here on own singular standalone title/series or origin title)	Dr. Victor Fries	Mr. Freeze	DC Comics
Assorted "Doctors" in various DC Comics titles, not found in own singular standalone title/series (or still needing info here on own singular standalone title/series or origin title)	Dr. Joar Mahkent	Icicle	DC Comics
Assorted "Doctors" in various DC Comics titles, not found in own singular standalone title/series (or still needing info here on own singular standalone title/series or origin title)	Dr. Pamela Isley	Poison Ivy	DC Comics
Assorted "Doctors" in various DC Comics titles, not found in own singular standalone title/series (or still needing info here on own singular standalone title/series or origin title)	Dr. Arthur Light	Doctor Light	DC Comics
Assorted "Doctors" in various DC Comics titles, not found in own singular standalone title/series (or still needing info here on own singular standalone title/series or origin title)	Dr. Will Magnus	Doc Magnus	DC Comics
Assorted "Doctors" in various DC Comics titles, not found in own singular standalone title/series (or still needing info here on own singular standalone title/series or origin title)	Dr. Kirk Langström	Man-Bat	DC Comics
Assorted "Doctors" in various DC Comics titles, not found in own singular standalone title/series (or still needing info here on own singular standalone title/series or origin title)	Dr. Jon Osterman	Doctor Manhattan	DC Comics
Assorted "Doctors" in various DC Comics titles, not found in own singular standalone title/series (or still needing info here on own singular standalone title/series or origin title)	Dr. Beth Chapel	Dr. Midnight	DC Comics
Assorted "Doctors" in various DC Comics titles, not found in own singular standalone title/series (or still needing info here on own singular standalone title/series or origin title)	Dr. Pieter Cross	Dr. Mid-Nite	DC Comics
Assorted "Doctors" in various DC Comics titles, not found in own singular standalone title/series (or still needing info here on own singular standalone title/series or origin title)	Dr. Charles McNider	Dr. Mid-Nite	DC Comics
Assorted "Doctors" in various DC Comics titles, not found in own singular standalone title/series (or still needing info here on own singular standalone title/series or origin title)	Dr. Achilles Milo	Professor Milo	DC Comics
Assorted "Doctors" in various DC Comics titles, not found in own singular standalone title/series (or still needing info here on own singular standalone title/series or origin title)	Dr. Moon	Doctor Moon	DC Comics
Assorted "Doctors" in various DC Comics titles, not found in own singular standalone title/series (or still needing info here on own singular standalone title/series or origin title)	Dr. Alex Sartorius	Doctor Phosphorus	DC Comics
Assorted "Doctors" in various DC Comics titles, not found in own singular standalone title/series (or still needing info here on own singular standalone title/series or origin title)	Dr. Harleen Quinzel	Harley Quinn	DC Comics
Assorted "Doctors" in various DC Comics titles, not found in own singular standalone title/series (or still needing info here on own singular standalone title/series or origin title)	Dr. Jonathan Crane	Scarecrow	DC Comics
Assorted "Doctors" in various DC Comics titles, not found in own singular standalone title/series (or still needing info here on own singular standalone title/series or origin title)	Dr. Thaddeus Bodog Sivana	Doctor Sivana	Fawcett Comics; DC Comics
Dr. Terrence Thirteen	Doctor Thirteen	DC Comics	
Assorted "Doctors" in various Marvel Comics titles, not found in own singular standalone title/series (or still needing info here on own singular standalone title/series or origin title)	Dr. Lester Verde	Doctor Bong	Marvel Comics
Assorted "Doctors" in various Marvel Comics titles, not found in own singular standalone title/series (or still needing info here on own singular standalone title/series or origin title)	Dr. Douglas Birely	Doctor Demonicus	Marvel Comics
Assorted "Doctors" in various Marvel Comics titles, not found in own singular standalone title/series (or still needing info here on own singular standalone title/series or origin title)	Dr. Victor von Doom	Doctor Doom	Marvel Comics
Assorted "Doctors" in various Marvel Comics titles, not found in own singular standalone title/series (or still needing info here on own singular standalone title/series or origin title)	Dr. Anthony Ludgate Druid	Doctor Druid	Marvel Comics
Assorted "Doctors" in various Marvel Comics titles, not found in own singular standalone title/series (or still needing info here on own singular standalone title/series or origin title)	Dr. Reed Richards	Mr. Fantastic	Marvel Comics
Assorted "Doctors" in various Marvel Comics titles, not found in own singular standalone title/series (or still needing info here on own singular standalone title/series or origin title)	Dr. Robert Bruce Banner	The Hulk	Marvel Comics
Assorted "Doctors" in various Marvel Comics titles, not found in own singular standalone title/series (or still needing info here on own singular standalone title/series or origin title)	Dr. Calvin Zabo	Mister Hyde	Marvel Comics
Assorted "Doctors" in various Marvel Comics titles, not found in own singular standalone title/series (or still needing info here on own singular standalone title/series or origin title)	Dr. Curtis Connors	Lizard	Marvel Comics
Assorted "Doctors" in various Marvel Comics titles, not found in own singular standalone title/series (or still needing info here on own singular standalone title/series or origin title)	Dr. Karla Sofen	Moonstone	Marvel Comics
Assorted "Doctors" in various Marvel Comics titles, not found in own singular standalone title/series (or still needing info here on own singular standalone title/series or origin title)	Dr. Otto Octavius	Doctor Octopus	Marvel Comics
Assorted "Doctors" in various Marvel Comics titles, not found in own singular standalone title/series (or still needing info here on own singular standalone title/series or origin title)	Dr. Cecilia Reyes	Cecilia Reyes	Marvel Comics
Assorted "Doctors" in various Marvel Comics titles, not found in own singular standalone title/series (or still needing info here on own singular standalone title/series or origin title)	Dr. Leonard Samson	Doc Samson	Marvel Comics
Assorted "Doctors" in various Marvel Comics titles, not found in own singular standalone title/series (or still needing info here on own singular standalone title/series or origin title)	Dr. Walter Langkowski	Sasquatch	Marvel Comics
Assorted "Doctors" in various Marvel Comics titles, not found in own singular standalone title/series (or still needing info here on own singular standalone title/series or origin title)	Dr. Michael Twoyoungmen	Shaman	Marvel Comics
Assorted "Doctors" in various Marvel Comics titles, not found in own singular standalone title/series (or still needing info here on own singular standalone title/series or origin title)	Dr. Walter Newell	Stingray	Marvel Comics
Assorted "Doctors" in various Marvel Comics titles, not found in own singular standalone title/series (or still needing info here on own singular standalone title/series or origin title)	Dr. Stephen Strange	Doctor Strange	Marvel Comics
Assorted "Doctors" in various Marvel Comics titles, not found in own singular standalone title/series (or still needing info here on own singular standalone title/series or origin title)	Dr. Karl Malus	Doctor Karl Malus	Marvel Comics
Assorted "Doctors" in various Marvel Comics titles, not found in own singular standalone title/series (or still needing info here on own singular standalone title/series or origin title)	Dr. Sun	Doctor Sun	Marvel Comics
Assorted "Doctors" in other publisher's titles, not found in own singular standalone title/series (or still needing info here on own singular standalone title/series or origin title)	Dr. Rex Morgan	Rex Morgan, M.D.	King Features Syndicate
Assorted "Doctors" in other publisher's titles, not found in own singular standalone title/series (or still needing info here on own singular standalone title/series or origin title)	Dr. Raymond Solar	Doctor Solar	Gold Key Comics
Assorted "Doctors" in other publisher's titles, not found in own singular standalone title/series (or still needing info here on own singular standalone title/series or origin title)	Dr. Peter Starr	Doctor Stellar	Big Bang Comics
Assorted "Doctors" in other publisher's titles, not found in own singular standalone title/series (or still needing info here on own singular standalone title/series or origin title)	Doctor Gorpon	Doctor Gorpon	NOW Comics

== Video games ==
Video game	Fictional doctor	Voice actor
Apollo Justice: Ace Attorney	Dr. Pal Meraktis	unknown
Assassin's Creed series	Warren Vidic; Roland Napule; Lyle White; Álvaro Gramática	Philip Proctor unknown Alex Ivanovici; Marcel Jeannin
BioShock series	Dr. Yi Suchong; Dr. Brigid Tenenbaum; Dr. J.S. Steinman; Dr. Sofia Lamb	James Yaegashi; Anne Bobby; Peter Francis James; Fenella Woolgar
Borderlands series	Dr. Zed Blanco	Ric Spiegel
Call of Duty series	Dr. Edward Richtofen Dr. Ludvig Maxis	Nolan North Fred Tatasciore
Crash Bandicoot series	Doctor Nefarious Tropy; Doctor Neo Cortex; Doctor N. Gin; Doctor Nitrus Brio	Michael Ensign; Brendan O'Brien; Brendan O'Brien; Brendan O'Brien
Dead by Daylight	Dr. Herman Carter	unknown
Dr. Mario and Super Smash Bros.	Dr. Mario	Charles Martinet
Dr. Luigi	Dr. Luigi	Charles Martinet
EarthBound	Dr. Andonuts	unknown
Eternal Darkness: Sanity's Requiem	Dr. Edwin Lindsey; Dr. Edward Roivas; Dr. Maximillian Roivas	Neil Ross; Neil Dickson; William Hootkins
Grand Theft Auto V	Isiah Friedlander	Bryan Scott Johnson
Guilty Gear	Doctor Baldhead	Kaneto Shiozawa
Half-Life	Dr. Gordon Freeman; Dr. Isaac Kleiner; Dr. Eli Vance; Dr. Wallace Breen; Dr. Judith Mossman	none Harry S. Robins; Robert Guillaume; Robert Culp; Michelle Forbes
Heroes of the Storm	Dr. Mei-Ling Zhou	Elise Zhang
Identity V	Dr. Emily Dyer	Skyler Davenport
Knack	Doctor Vargas	JB Blanc
League of Legends	Doctor Mundo	
Mega Man	Dr. Thomas Light; Dr. Albert W. Wily	Jim Byrnes; Dean Galloway
No More Heroes	Dr. Peace	Richard McGonagle
Overwatch	Dr. Angela Ziegler (Mercy) Dr. Mei-Ling Zhou	Lucie Pohl Elise Zhang
Phantasy Star II	Dr. Amy Sage	unknown
Phoenix Wright: Ace Attorney − Justice for All	Dr. Turner Grey	unknown
Poppy Playtime	The Doctor / Harley Sawyer	Baldwin Williams Jr.
Resident Evil 4	Dr. Salvador	unknown
Team Fortress 2	The Medic	Robin Atkin Downes
The Sims 2	Therapist	unknown
Sonic the Hedgehog	Dr. Eggman	Deem Bristow; Mike Pollock
Tekken 3	Dr. Abel; Dr. Bosconovitch	unknown unknown
Trauma Center: Under the Knife	Dr. Greg Kasal; Dr. Derek Stiles; Dr. Nozomi Weaver	unknown Yuri Lowenthal; Kirsten Potter
Touhou Project	Eirin Yagokoro	
WarioWare	Dr. Crygor	Kyle Hebert

== Music ==
Song or musical piece / Album	Fictional doctor	Performer	Writer/creator
First Come, First Served	Dr. Dooom	Kool Keith	Kool Keith
Dr. Octagonecologyst	Dr. Octagon	Kool Keith	Kool Keith
"Calling Dr. Love"	Dr. Love	Kiss	Gene Simmons
Doktor Faust	Doktor Faust		Ferruccio Busoni
"Dr. Feelgood (Love Is a Serious Business)" / I Never Loved a Man the Way I Love You, Aretha's Gold, Aretha's Greatest Hits	Dr. Feelgood	Aretha Franklin	A. Franklin, White
"Dr. Feelgood" / Dr. Feelgood	Dr. Feelgood	Mötley Crüe	Nikki Sixx, Mick Mars
Frankenstein: The Modern Prometheus	Dr. Victor Frankenstein		Libby Larsen
"Dr. Funkenstein" / The Clones of Dr. Funkenstein (1976)	Dr. Funkenstein	Parliament	George Clinton, Bootsy Collins, Bernie Worrell
"Dr. Music"	Dr. Music	Blue Öyster Cult	
"Doctor Robert"	Dr. Robert	The Beatles	John Lennon/Paul McCartney
"Help Me Dr. Dick"	Dr. Dick	E-Rotic	David Brandes, John O'Flynn
"Sometimes (Dr. Hirsch)"	Dr. Hirsch	Yello	Boris Blank & Dieter Meier
"Dr. Van Steiner"	Dr. Van Steiner	Yello	Boris Blank & Dieter Meier
"Doctor Worm"	Dr. Worm	They Might Be Giants	John Flansburgh, John Linnell

== Internet ==
Web page/program	Fictional doctor	Creator(s)
The Adventures of Dr. McNinja	Dr. McNinja	Chris Hastings; Kent Archer
Childrens Hospital	Dr. Cat Black; Dr. Brian; Dr. Blake Downs; Dr. Valerie Flame; Dr. Ed Helms; Dr. Owen Maestro; Dr. Jason Mantzoukas; Dr. Glenn Richie; Dr. Nate Schacter; Dr. Lola Spratt; Dr. Max Von Sydow	Rob Corddry
Dr. Horrible's Sing-Along Blog	Dr. Horrible	Joss Whedon
The Radio Adventures of Dr. Floyd	Dr. Floyd J. Floyd Jr. Dr. Floyd J. Floyd Sr. Dr. Grant; Dr. Steve	Grant Baciocco; Doug Price
