= Spellbound (1945 film) =

Film by Alfred Hitchcock

- Theatrical release poster
- Directed by: Alfred Hitchcock
- Screenplay by: Ben Hecht
- Adaptation by: Angus MacPhail
- Based on: The House of Dr. Edwardes by Hilary Saint George Saunders and Francis Beeding
- Produced by: David O. Selznick
- Starring: Ingrid Bergman; Gregory Peck
- Cinematography: George Barnes
- Edited by: Hal C. Kern
- Music by: Miklós Rózsa
- Production companies: Selznick International Pictures; Vanguard Films
- Distributed by: United Artists
- Release dates: October 31, 1945 (New York City); December 28, 1945 (United States)
- Running time: 111 minutes
- Country: United States
- Language: English
- Budget: US$1.5 million
- Box office: US$6.4 million

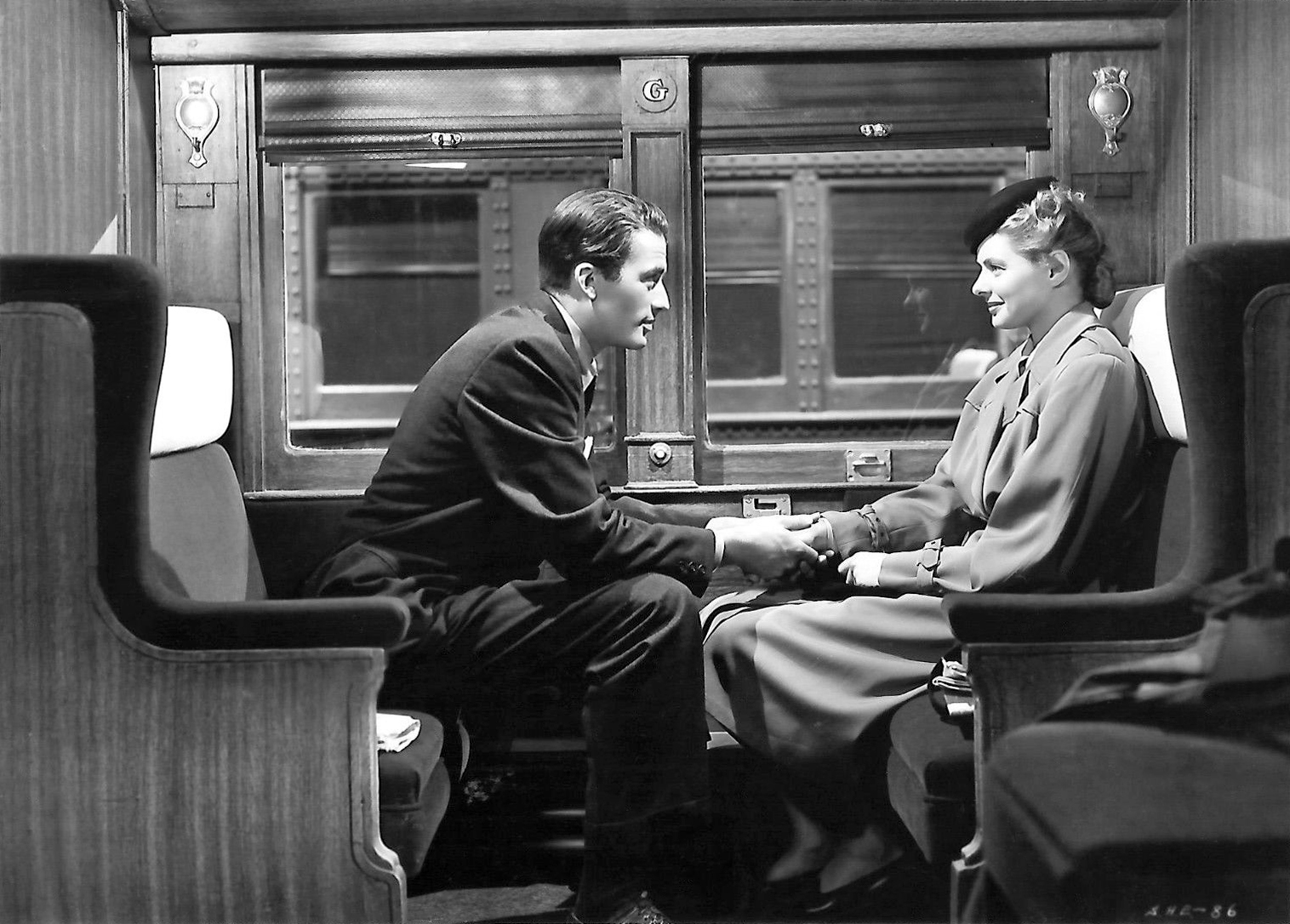
A still from Spellbound

Spellbound is a 1945 American psychological thriller film directed by Alfred Hitchcock, and starring Ingrid Bergman, Gregory Peck, Michael Chekhov, and Leo G. Carroll. It follows a psychoanalyst who falls in love with the new head of the Vermont hospital in which she works. Although the film is based on the 1927 novel The House of Dr. Edwardes by Hilary Saint George Saunders and John Palmer, the plots are dramatically different.

Filming took place in the summer of 1944 in Vermont, Utah, and Los Angeles, California. Spellbound was released theatrically in New York City on Halloween 1945, after which its U.S. release expanded on December 28, 1945. The film received positive reviews from critics and was a major box-office success, grossing $6.4 million in the United States and breaking ticket sales records in London. The film was nominated for six Academy Awards, including Best Picture and Best Director, and won Best Original Score.

== Plot ==
Dr. Constance Petersen is a psychoanalyst at Green Manors, a mental hospital in Vermont, accused by an unsuccessful suitor colleague of being icy and unemotional. The hospital's director, Dr. Murchison, is forced into retirement shortly after returning from an absence due to nervous exhaustion. His replacement, Dr. Anthony Edwardes, turns out to be surprisingly young. Uncharacteristically, Petersen is immediately smitten with Edwardes, who returns her feelings.

While kissing him, Petersen notices that Edwardes has a peculiar phobia about sets of parallel lines against a white background, displayed on several occasions. She compares his signature with an autographed copy of one of his books, realizing when they do not match that he is an impostor. He confides to her that he has killed the real Edwardes, who was treating him, and taken his place. Suffering from amnesia, he does not know who he really is, but they deduce that he is a doctor when he displays medical knowledge. Petersen believes he is an innocent man with a guilt complex. Overnight, he disappears. Edwardes' assistant arrives and discloses that the Edwardes who spoke to her on the phone is an impostor, and that the real Edwardes is ominously missing.

Petersen tracks the impostor to a New York City hotel, where he is living under the pseudonym "John Brown". Despite his insistence that she leave, she convinces him that psychoanalysis can recover his memories. The two travel to Rochester, New York, and stay with Dr. Alexander Brulov, Petersen's former mentor and friend.

The two psychoanalysts interpret a dream that "Brown" describes. He is playing cards in a mysterious club when a scantily clad woman resembling Petersen starts kissing everybody there. His card partner, an older man, is accused of cheating and threatened by the club's masked proprietor. The scene changes to the older man standing on the precipice of a sloped roof and falling off. The proprietor is found to be standing behind a chimney and dropping a wheel he held in his hand. "Brown's" dream concludes with him chased down a hill by a great pair of wings.

"Brown's" phobia of dark lines on white represents ski tracks in the snow, and the older man in his dream is the real Edwardes, who died in a skiing accident. The detail of the wings they deduce to represent Gabriel Valley ski lodge. "Brown" and Petersen travel there to recreate the circumstances of Edwardes' death. However, "Brown" fears that, if he really was Edwardes' murderer, he may impulsively kill again in the same situation.

As they ski down the slope, "Brown" remembers details of his former life: he has a guilt complex, rooted in a childhood accident where he accidentally killed his brother by sliding down a concrete banister and knocking him onto a spiked fence. He also recognizes the cliff where Edwardes fell off, and then "Brown" recalls his own real name: John Ballantyne. Petersen and Ballantyne later meet with the police, who find Edwardes' body with Ballantyne's directions. However, the corpse has a bullet wound in his back. Ballantyne is arrested, tried, and convicted of murder.

Heartbroken, Petersen returns to Green Manors. Murchison, once again the director, lets slip that he knew Edwardes slightly and disliked him, contradicting his earlier statement that they had never met. This inspires Petersen to re-examine her notes of Ballantyne's dream: the masked proprietor represents Murchison and the wheel represents a revolver. Murchison therefore murdered Edwardes and left the gun on the ski slope.

Confronting Murchison to prove her hunch, Petersen gets him to admit that the man in the dream likely represents himself. She presents her accusation, and Murchison replies that she got every detail right but one: he still has the revolver and draws it on her. Calmly, Petersen points out that while he could plead insanity and get a lesser charge for Edwardes' murder, shooting her in cold blood would guarantee his execution. With the gun still pointed at her, she leaves the office to phone the police, before Murchison turns the gun and shoots himself.

Petersen and Ballantyne, now married, receive well-wishes from Dr. Brulov before departing on their honeymoon at Grand Central Terminal.

== Cast ==
- Ingrid Bergman as Dr. Constance Petersen
- Gregory Peck as Dr. Anthony Edwardes / John Brown / John Ballantyne
- Michael Chekhov as Dr. Alexander "Alex" Brulov, a teacher of Dr. Petersen's
- Leo G. Carroll as Dr. Murchison, the head of Green Manors
- Rhonda Fleming as Mary Carmichael, a patient at Green Manors
- John Emery as Dr. Fleurot
- Norman Lloyd as Mr. Garmes, a patient at Green Manors
- Bill Goodwin as house detective of the Empire State Hotel
- Steven Geray as Dr. Graff
- Donald Curtis as Harry, a staff member of Green Manors
- Wallace Ford as stranger in Empire State Hotel lobby
- Art Baker as Det. Lt. Cooley
- Regis Toomey as Det. Sgt. Gillespie
- Paul Harvey as Dr. Hanish

== Production ==
=== Development ===
Spellbound was made over contract disagreements between Alfred Hitchcock and producer David O. Selznick. Hitchcock's contract with Selznick began in March 1939, but only resulted in three films: Rebecca (1940), Spellbound and The Paradine Case (1947) (he made seven other films during that period under loan-out deals to other studios, including 1946's Notorious which was sold to RKO in mid-production.) Selznick had wanted Hitchcock to make a film based upon Selznick's own positive experience with psychoanalysis; Selznick, at Hitchcock's suggestion, purchased the rights to the 1927 novel The House of Dr. Edwardes by Hilary St. George Saunders and John Palmer (who had co-written it under the pseudonym Francis Beeding), for approximately $40,000.

In December 1943, Hitchcock and his wife, Alma Reville, began working on a treatment of the novel, and consulted prominent British psychologists and psychoanalysts so as to accurately represent the psychological elements of the story. However, the following month, in January 1944, Hitchcock hired Angus MacPhail, with whom he had collaborated on several war-related short films, to co-author the treatment. MacPhail was ultimately given the adaptation credit, and the extent to which Reville was involved in the final product is unknown. Following the completion of the treatment, screenwriter Ben Hecht began writing the screenplay.

Between May and July 1944, Selznick submitted numerous drafts of Hecht's screenplay for approval from the Motion Picture Association of America (MPAA), which objected to various words and phrases in it, including "sex menace," "frustrations," "libido," and "tomcat." This resulted in some alterations in the screenplay, including the removal of most of a character named Mary Carmichael, a violent nymphomaniac at Green Manors. However, the suicide of Dr. Murchison in the screenplay—which typically violated the MPAA's rules against depicting suicide—was allowed to remain, as it was reasoned by Selznick that the character was clearly "of unsound mind," rendering him an exception.

=== Casting ===
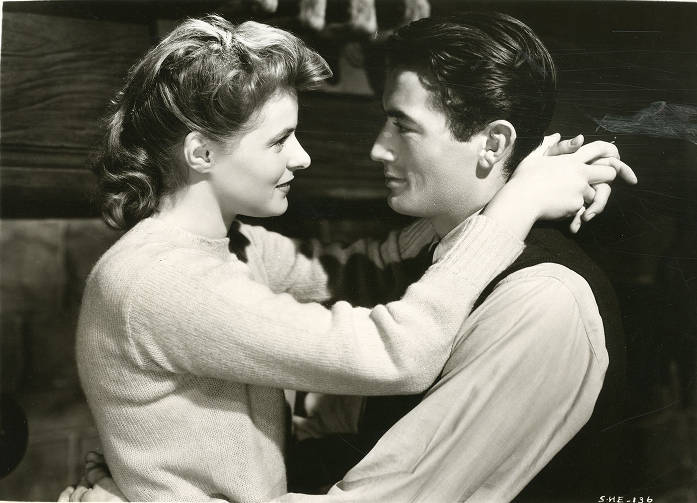
Bergman and Peck in a still from the film

Selznick originally wanted Joseph Cotten, Dorothy McGuire, and Paul Lukas to play the roles ultimately portrayed by Peck, Bergman, and Chekhov, respectively. Greta Garbo was considered for the role of Dr. Constance Petersen. Hitchcock wanted Joseph Cotten to portray Dr. Murchison. Selznick also wanted Jennifer Jones to portray Dr. Petersen but Hitchcock objected. Five years after her death, Peck revealed to People magazine that he had a brief affair with Bergman during the filming of the movie.

=== Filming ===
Selznick brought in his own therapist, May Romm, MD, to serve as a technical advisor on the production. Dr. Romm and Hitchcock clashed frequently.

Further contention was caused by the hiring of surrealist artist Salvador Dalí to conceive certain scenes in the film's key dream sequence. However, the sequence conceived and designed by Dalí and Hitchcock, once translated to film, proved to be too lengthy and complicated for Selznick, so the vast majority of what had been filmed ultimately was edited out. Two minutes of the dream sequence appear in the final film, but according to Ingrid Bergman, the original had been twenty minutes long. The cut footage is now considered lost, although some production stills have survived in the Selznick archives. Eventually, Selznick hired William Cameron Menzies, who had worked on Gone With the Wind, to oversee the set designs and direct the sequence. Hitchcock himself had very little to do with its actual filming.

Both Bergman and Peck were married to others at the time of production—Bergman to Petter Aron Lindström, and Peck to Greta Kukkonen—but they had a brief affair during filming. Their secret relationship became public knowledge when Peck confessed to Brad Darrach of People in an interview in 1987, five years after Bergman's death. "All I can say is that I had a fiery kinda love for her, and I think that's where I ought to stop... I was young. She was young. We were involved for weeks in close and intense work."

Parts of the film were shot in Alta, Utah at the Alta Lodge and Wasatch Ranch. The film's picnic sequence between Peck and Bergmans' characters was filmed at the Cooper Ranch in Northridge, Los Angeles, while other sequences—such as the train depot scene—were filmed on the Universal Studios lot.

Hitchcock's cameo appearance in the film occurs approximately at the forty-minute mark, when he can be seen exiting an elevator at the Empire State Hotel, carrying a violin case and smoking a cigarette. The trailer for Spellbound's original theatrical release in America highlighted this cameo of Hitchcock's, showing the footage twice and even freeze-framing Hitchcock's brief appearance while a narrator points out that the ordinary-looking man in the footage is the director.

Spellbound was shot in black and white, except for two frames of bright red at the conclusion, when Dr. Murchison's gun is fired into the camera. This detail was deleted in most 16mm and video formats but was restored for the film's DVD release and airings on Turner Classic Movies.

=== Music ===
The film features an orchestral score by Miklós Rózsa that pioneered the use of the theremin, performed by Dr. Samuel Hoffman. Selznick originally wanted Bernard Herrmann, but when Herrmann became unavailable, Rózsa was hired and eventually won the Oscar for his score. Although Rózsa considered Spellbound to contain some of his best work, he said "Alfred Hitchcock didn't like the music — said it got in the way of his direction. I haven't seen him since." In his autobiography, Rózsa wrote that he was saddened that Hitchcock had not congratulated him, or even attempted to contact him, for winning an Oscar for his film's score.

During the film's protracted post-production, considerable disagreement arose about the music, exacerbated by a lack of communication between producer, director, and composer. Rózsa had scored another film, The Lost Weekend, before Spellbound was released and had used the theremin in that score as well. This led to allegations that he had recycled music from Selznick's film in the Paramount production. Meanwhile, Selznick's assistant Audray Granville tampered with the Spellbound scoring by replacing some of Rózsa's material with earlier music by Franz Waxman and Roy Webb. The tangled history of the scoring process has been explored by Jack Sullivan (Hitchcock's Music, 2006) and especially Nathan Platte (Making Music in Selznick's Hollywood, 2018), both of which qualify and sometimes contradict the early accounts of the participants.

Rózsa's music achieved great popularity outside the film. Selznick's innovative use of promotional recordings for radio broadcast made the themes familiar and eventually inspired Rózsa to prepare a full-scale Spellbound Concerto for piano, theremin, and orchestra. This work became a popular staple in the movie concerto genre and has received multiple recordings. Intrada Records made the first recording of the film's complete score with the Slovak Radio Symphony Orchestra. This album also included music not heard in the finished film.

Intrada Records album
No.	Title	Length
1.	"Main Title; Foreword"	3:13
2.	"Green Manors"	0:51
3.	"First Meeting"	2:11
4.	"The Picnic"	2:01
5.	"The Awakening; Love Scene; The Dressing Gown; The Imposter – Parts 1 & 2; The Cigarette Case"	16:49
6.	"The Letter"	0:30
7.	"The Empire Hotel"	1:22
8.	"The Burned Hand – Parts 1 & 2"	2:29
9.	"The Penn Station"	2:44
10.	"Railway Carriage"	1:16
11.	"Honeymoon at Brulov's; The White Coverlet; The Razor – Parts 1 & 2; Constance Is Afraid"	10:03
12.	"Constance and Brulov – Parts 1 & 2"	4:15
13.	"Gambling Dream; Mad Proprietors Dream; Roof-Top Dreams"	2:37
14.	"Dream Interpretation – Parts 1 & 2; The Decision"	6:10
15.	"Train to Gabriel Valley"	1:23
16.	"Ski Run; Mountain Lodge"	5:51
17.	"Defeat"	3:15
18.	"Contance's Discovery"	2:04
19.	"The Revolver"	3:05
20.	"The End"	0:59
21.	"End Title – Short"	0:24

=== Production credits ===
The production credits on the film were as follows:

- Director – Alfred Hitchcock
- Producer – David O. Selznick
- Writing – Ben Hecht (screenplay), Angus MacPhail (adaptation)
- Cinematography – George Barnes (director of photography)
- Music – Miklós Rózsa
- Art direction – James Basevi (art director), John Ewing (associate art director), Emile Kuri (interior decoration)
- Film editing – Hal C. Kern (supervising film editor), William H. Ziegler (associate film editor)
- Production assistant – Barbara Keon
- Special effects – Jack Cosgrove – special effects
- Assistant director – Lowell J. Farrell
- Sound – Richard DeWeese (recorder)
- Design of dream sequence – Salvador Dalí
- Psychiatric advisor – May E. Romm, M.D.

== Release ==
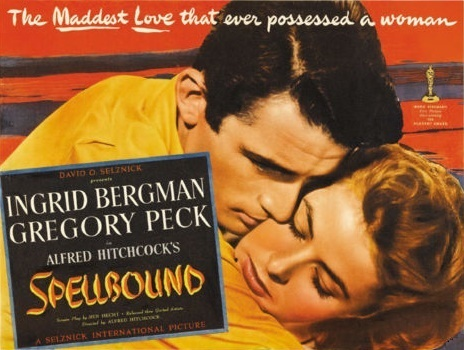
Poster for Spellbound

=== Theatrical ===
Spellbound opened theatrically in New York City on Halloween 1945, and the following week in Los Angeles, on November 8, 1945. It was subsequently given a wide release in the United States on December 28, 1945. It earned rentals of $4,975,000 in North America.

Upon the film's British release, it broke every box office record in London, in both famous theaters, Pavilion and Tivoli Strand, for a single day, week, month, holiday and Sundays.

=== Home media ===
In 1999, Anchor Bay Entertainment released Spellbound for the first time on DVD. The Criterion Collection subsequently issued a DVD release in 2002. In 2012, MGM Home Entertainment released the film on Blu-ray.

=== Critical response ===
Newsweek's review evaluated the film as "a superior and suspenseful melodrama;" Bosley Crowther of The New York Times wrote that the story was "a rather obvious and often-told tale ... but the manner and quality of its telling is extraordinarily fine ... the firm texture of the narration, the flow of continuity and dialogue, the shock of the unexpected, the scope of image—all are happily here." Variety wrote that Bergman gave a "beautiful characterization" and that Peck "handles the suspense scenes with great skill and has one of his finest screen roles to date." Harrison's Reports wrote: "Very good! ... The performances of the entire cast are superior, and throughout the action an overtone of suspense and terror, tinged with touches of deep human interest and appealing romance, is sustained." John McCarten of The New Yorker wrote that "when the film stops trying to be esoteric and abandons arcane mumbling for good, rousing melodrama, it moves along in the manner to which Hitchcock has accustomed us ... Fortunately, the English expert hasn't forgotten any of his tricks. He still has a nice regard for supplementary characters, and he uses everything from train whistles to grand orchestral crescendos to maintain excitement at a shrill pitch ... All in all, you'd better see this one." In The Nation in 1945, critic James Agee wrote, "Alfred Hitchcock's surprisingly disappointing thriller about psychoanalysis, is worth seeing, but hardly more ... I felt that the makers of the film had succeeded in using practically none of the movie possibilities of a psychoanalytic story, even those of the simplest melodrama; and that an elaborate, none-too-interesting murder mystery, though stoutly moored to the unconscious, merely cheapened and got in the way of any possible psychological interest ... As for the dream designed by Salvador Dali, it is ... frankly irrelevant to dream reality, and so to criticism for its lack of reality in that direct sense ... "

Spellbound placed fifth on Film Daily's annual poll of 559 critics across the United States naming the best films of the year.

Rotten Tomatoes rates the film 86% fresh, based on 44 reviews. Its critical consensus says: "Spellbound's exploration of the subconscious could have benefitted from more analysis, but Alfred Hitchcock's psychedelic flourishes elevate this heady thriller along with Ingrid Bergman and Gregory Peck's star power".

== Accolades ==
Award	Category	Subject	Result
Academy Awards	Best Picture	David O. Selznick	Nominated
Academy Awards	Best Director	Alfred Hitchcock	Nominated
Academy Awards	Best Supporting Actor	Michael Chekhov	Nominated
Academy Awards	Best Cinematography	George Barnes	Nominated
Academy Awards	Best Original Score	Miklós Rózsa	Won
Academy Awards	Best Visual Effects	Jack Cosgrove	Nominated
NYFCC Award	Best Actress	Ingrid Bergman	Won
Venice Film Festival	Grand International Award	Alfred Hitchcock	Nominated

== Legacy ==
Spellbound served as a notable milestone in the careers of both of its lead actors. It was the first time in Ingrid Bergman's career that she received top billing on an American film. Although Gregory Peck was already established as a star, Spellbound showcased his dramatic talent and versatility, leading him to more complex characters later in his career.

Spellbound was performed as a one-hour radio adaptation on Lux Radio Theatre on March 8, 1948. On January 25, 1951 Screen Directors Playhouse also did a one-hour adaptation. Both versions starred Joseph Cotten.

Spellbound was one of the first films to have its soundtrack released in album form. The success of the soundtrack album encouraged other films to follow suit, inspiring what is now a standard practice. Rózsa's score inspired Jerry Goldsmith to become a film composer.

It also pioneered the depiction of psychoanalysis in the media, including as the first film to depict dreams as containing symbols of the psyche of the dreamer. The film contributed to widespread recognition of Freudian psychology among the public.

== See also ==
- Dissociative amnesia – Memory disorder
- List of American films of 1945
- List of works by Salvador Dalí
- Mental illness in films

== Sources ==
- D'Arc, James V. (2010). When Hollywood Came to Town: A History of Moviemaking in Utah (1st ed.). Layton, Utah: Gibbs Smith. ISBN 978-1-423-60587-4.
- Fishgall, Gary (2002). Gregory Peck: A Biography. New York: Simon and Schuster. ISBN 978-0-684-85290-4.
- Green, Paul (2011). Jennifer Jones: The Life and Films. Jefferson, North Carolina: McFarland. ISBN 978-0-786-48583-3.
- Haney, Lynn (2009). Gregory Peck: A Charmed Life. New York: Da Capo Press. ISBN 978-0-786-73781-9.
- Hanson, Patricia King, ed. (1999). The American Film Institute Catalog of Motion Pictures Produced in the United States: Feature Films, 1941–1950. Berkeley and Los Angeles: University of California Press. ISBN 978-0-5202-1521-4.
- McGilligan, Patrick (2004). Alfred Hitchcock: A Life in Darkness and Light. New York: HarperCollins. ISBN 978-0-060-98827-2.
- Millington, Richard; Freedman, Jonathan (1999). Hitchcock's America. Oxford: Oxford University Press. ISBN 978-0-195-35331-0.
- Spoto, Donald (1999). The Dark Side of Genius: The Life of Alfred Hitchcock. New York: Da Capo Press. ISBN 978-0-306-80932-3.
- Thomson, David (1993). Showman: The Life of David O. Selznick. New York: Abacus. ISBN 978-0-394-56833-1.
- Truffaut, François (1983) [1967]. Hitchcock/Truffaut (Revised ed.). New York: Simon & Schuster. ISBN 978-0-671-52601-6.
- Wijdicks, Eelco F.M. (2020). Cinema, MD: A History of Medicine On Screen. Oxford: Oxford University Press. ISBN 978-0-190-68581-2.
