= John Palmer (author) =

English critic and author (1885–1944)

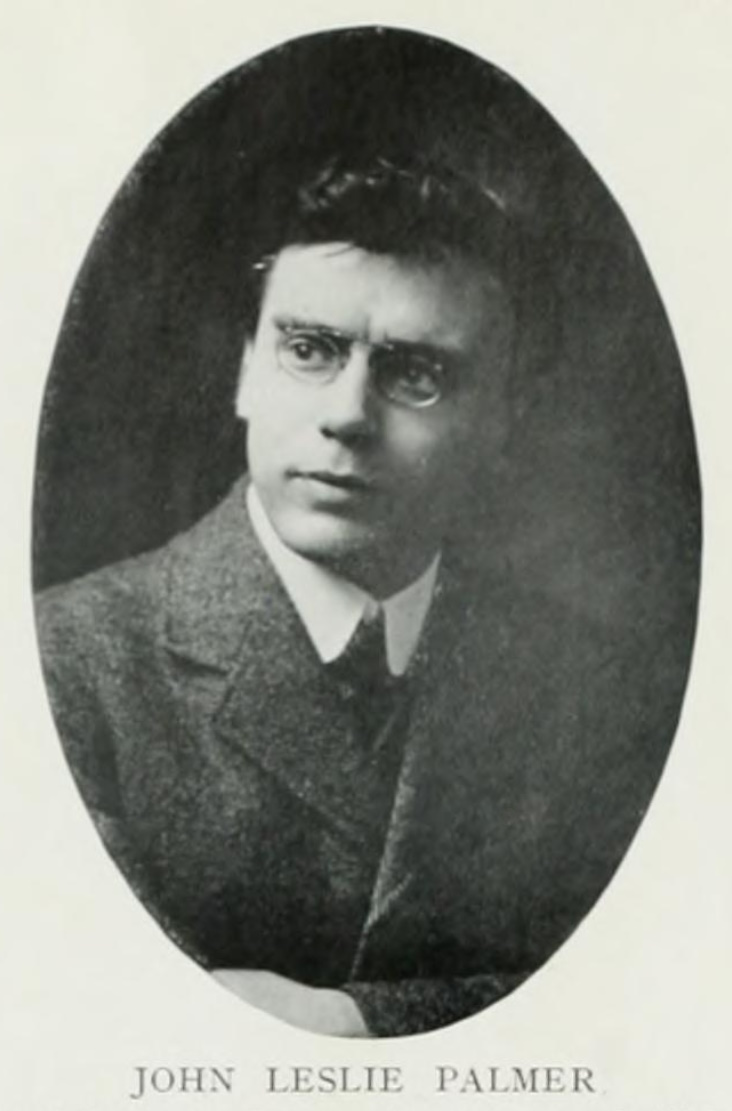
- Palmer, c. 1922
- Born: John Leslie Palmer; 4 September 1885; Paddington, London, England
- Died: 5 August 1944 (aged 58); Hampstead, London, England
- Occupations: Theatre critic; author
- Writing career
- Pen name: Francis Beeding; Christopher Haddon; David Pilgrim; John Somers

John Leslie Palmer (4 September 1885 – 5 August 1944) was an English theatre critic and prolific author. Under his own name, he wrote extensively about early English actors and about British literary figures. He also wrote fiction under the pseudonyms 'John Somers' and 'Christopher Haddon' and collaboratively (with Hilary St. George Saunders) as 'Francis Beeding' and 'David Pilgrim'.

Palmer lived in Geneva for eighteen years from 1920 to 1938, working in the Secretariat of the League of Nations. His long-term collaboration with Hilary Saunders, who was also an employee of the Secretariat, began during those years.

== Biography ==
John Leslie Palmer was born on 4 September 1885 at Paddington in London.

Palmer studied at Balliol College in Oxford University where he was a Brackenbury history scholar.

In 1909 Palmer joined the staff of the weekly Saturday Review newspaper. The following year he was appointed as an assistant-editor and the dramatic critic for the publication, which roles he occupied until 1919. He established his reputation as a theatre critic by the quality of his writing and the publication of two books, The Censor and the Theatres (1912) and The Comedy of Manners (a study of the Restoration dramatists published in 1913).

John Palmer and Mildred Hodson Woodfield were married in 1911. The couple had two children, a son and a daughter.

Palmer's first work of fiction was published in February 1912, a book titled A Chord Once Struck which was published under the nom-de-plume of 'John Somers'. In 1914 a play written by Palmer called Over the Hills, described as a "comedy in one act", was published. During 1915 he had two books on George Bernard Shaw published, as well as another book of fiction, Peter Paragon: A Tale of Youth (published by Dodd, Mead & Co. of New York). Palmer also worked as the dramatic critic for the Evening Standard from 1916 to 1919.

After the outbreak of World War I Palmer was precluded from the armed services due to "bad eyesight". During the war he assisted in the War Trade Intelligence Department in the Ministry of Blockade within the Foreign Office, engaged in work to enforce the economic blockade against Germany.^{[A]}

After the war ended Palmer was a member of the British delegation at the Peace Conference in Paris, which commenced in January 1919. In 1920 Palmer was appointed to the permanent Secretariat of the League of Nations, residing in Geneva, Switzerland. One of the members of staff supervised by Palmer at the Secretariat was Hilary St. George Saunders, a fellow graduate of Balliol College at Oxford. The men became friends and began writing collaboratively, writing works of fiction under the pseudonym of 'Francis Beeding'.

Palmer and Saunders preserved the anonymity of their collaboration until 1925 when the writing partnership was publicly revealed. The occasion was a talk by Saunders, as 'Francis Beeding', discussing his method of work. Palmer heckled him from the audience and Saunders, feigning desperation, invited him onto the platform where the dual authorship was revealed. As 'Francis Beeding' Palmer and Saunders co-authored thirty-one novels, including the gothic novel The House of Dr. Edwardes (later used as the basis for the Hitchcock film Spellbound). Six of the 'Francis Beeding' novels are detective stories: Death Walks at Eastrepps (1931), Murder Intended (1932), The Emerald Clasp (1933), The Norwich Victims (1935), No Fury (1937) and He Could Not Have Slipped (1939). Two are treasure hunt novels: The Street of the Serpents (1934) and The Big Fish (1938). The remainder of the 'Francis Beeding' books are spy novels, beginning with The Seven Sleepers (1925) and ending with There Are Thirteen (published after Palmer's death in 1946). In discussing their collaboration, Saunders commented that "Palmer can't be troubled with description and narrative, and I'm no good at creating characters or dialogue", adding: "Whatever the reason it certainly worked". Many of the 'Francis Beeding' books feature recurring characters such as the British Secret Service agents Alistair Granby and Ronald Briercliffe.

Palmer and Saunders also jointly used the pseudonym 'David Pilgrim', publishing three books of historical fiction under that name. Palmer also published as 'Christopher Haddon'. He also continued to write books of non-fiction, completing biographies of Rudyard Kipling (1928), Molière (1930) and Ben Jonson (1934). Palmer also wrote books on Shakespeare's comic and political characters which were published after his death.

Palmer remained at the Secretariat of the League of Nations in Geneva for eighteen years, finally leaving in 1938. Saunders had finished working at the Secretariat in 1937. At the time of his death in 1944 Palmer was living on Hampstead Way in Hampstead, London.

John Palmer died at a hospital in Hampstead on 5 August 1944, aged 58. His funeral was held on 9 August at Golders Green Crematorium.

In 1946 Hilary Saunders, Palmer's long-term writing partner, published John Palmer, 1885-1944: A Memoir.

== Publications ==
=== Non-fiction ===
By John Palmer:

- The Censor and the Theatres (1912), London: T. Fisher Unwin.
- The Comedy of Manners (1913), London: G. Bell & Sons Ltd.
- The Future of the Theatre (1913), London: G. Bell & Sons Ltd.
- Bernard Shaw: An Epitaph (1915), London: Grant Richards Ltd.
- Bernard Shaw: Harlequin or Patriot? (1915), New York: The Century Co.
- Studies in Contemporary Theatre (1927), Secker.
- Rudyard Kipling (1928), London: Nisbet & Co. Ltd.
- Molière: His Life and Works (1930), London: G. Bell & Sons Ltd.
- Ben Jonson (1934), New York: The Viking Press.
- Political Characters of Shakespeare (1945), London: Macmillan & Co. Ltd.
- Comic Characters of Shakespeare (1946), London: Macmillan & Co. Ltd.

=== Fiction ===
As 'John Somers':

- A Chord Once Struck, London: Murray & Evenden (1912)

By John Palmer:

- Peter Paragon: A Tale of Youth (1915), New York: Dodd, Mead & Co.
- The King's Men (1916), London: Martin Secker.
- The Happy Fool (1922), New York: Harcourt, Brace & Co.
- Looking After Joan (1923), New York: Harcourt, Brace & Co.
- Jennifer (1926)
- Timothy (1931)
- The Hesperides (1936)
- Mandragora (1940), London: Victor Gollancz (US title: The Man With Two Names by John Palmer, New York: Dodd, Mead & Co.)

As 'Francis Beeding' (Palmer and Saunders):

- The Seven Sleepers (1925) (Professor Kreutzemark series)
- The Little White Hag (1926)
- The Hidden Kingdom (1927) (Professor Kreutzemark series)
- The House of Dr. Edwardes (1927)
- The Six Proud Walkers (1928) (Alistair Granby series)^{[B]}
- The Five Flamboys (1929) (Alastair Granby series)
- Pretty Sinister (1929) (Alastair Granby series)
- The League of Discontent (1930) (Alastair Granby series)
- The Four Armourers (1930) (Alastair Granby series)
- Death Walks in Eastrepps (1931) (Inspector Wilkins series)
- The Three Fishers (1931) (Ronald Briercliffe series)
- Take It Crooked (1931) (Alastair Granby series)
- Murder Intended (1932) (Inspector Wilkins series)
- The Two Undertakers (1933) (Ronald Briercliffe & Alastair Granby series)
- The Emerald Clasp (1933)
- The One Sane Man (1934) (Alastair Granby series)
- Mr Bobadil (1934); also published as The Street of the Serpents

- 'The Woman He Had to Kill', Mystery (Tower Magazines, Chicago), June 1934, pages 24–27, 53, 56, 58, 62, 64.
- The Norwich Victims (1935) (George Martin series)
- Death in Four Letters (1935)
- Nine Waxed Faces (1936) (Alastair Granby series)
- The Eight Crooked Trenches (1936); also published as Coffin for One (Alastair Granby series)
- No Fury (1937); also published as Murdered One by One (George Martin series)
- The Erring Under-Secretary (1937) (Alastair Granby series)^{[C]}
- Hell Let Loose (1937) (Ronald Briercliffe & Alastair Granby series)
- The Black Arrows (1938) (Alastair Granby series)
- The Big Fish (1938); also published as Heads Off at Midnight
- The Ten Holy Horrors (1939) (Alastair Granby series)
- He Could Not Have Slipped (1939) (Inspector Wilkins series)
- Eleven Were Brave (1940) (Alastair Granby series)
- Not a Bad Show (1940); also published as Secret Weapon (Alastair Granby series)
- The Twelve Disguises (1942) (Alastair Granby series)
- There Are Thirteen (1946) (Alastair Granby series)

As 'David Pilgrim' (Palmer and Saunders):

- So Great A Man (1937), a historical novel about Napoleon.
- No Common Glory (1941) (James de la Cloche series)
- The Grand Design (1943) (James de la Cloche series)

As 'John Somers' (Palmer and Saunders):

- The Brethren of the Axe, London: John Murray (1926)

As 'Christopher Haddon':

- Under the Long Barrow (1939), London: Victor Gollancz (US title: The Man in the Purple Gown)

== Notes ==
A.The War Trade Intelligence Department was established on 1 February 1915, as the Intelligence Branch of the War Trade Department (under the title of the "Trade Clearing House"). It acted as a clearing house for all forms of intelligence on war trade available in the various Government departments. Early in 1916, when Lord Robert Cecil was appointed Minister of Blockade, the Trade Clearing House became the intelligence department of the new Ministry. Its name was changed to the "War Trade Intelligence Department". The department was dissolved on 31 October 1919.

B.The Six Proud Walkers was serialised in the Lancashire Evening Post in 1929.

C.The Erring Under-Secretary (1937) had been previously serialised in Answers as 'A Wife Too Many' (from 12 January and 2 February 1935).
