= The House of Dr. Edwardes =

1927 novel by Francis Beeding

- First US edition (1928)
- Author: Francis Beeding (pseudonym for Hilary A. Saunders and John Palmer)
- Language: English
- Genre: Psychological Thriller
- Publisher: Hodder & Stoughton (UK); Little, Brown and Company (US)
- Publication date: 1927
- Publication place: United Kingdom
- Media type: Print (Hardback)
- Pages: 308 pp

The House of Dr. Edwardes is a psychological thriller novel written by John Palmer and Hilary A. Saunders under the pseudonym Francis Beeding.

The plot concerns an asylum that is about to get a new director. The new man is knocked unconscious and imprisoned by an imposter who allows patients—including a satanist planning a human sacrifice—to run amuck.

The novel was adapted to film in 1945 as Alfred Hitchcock's Spellbound. The film uses the idea of an imposter and some character names, but otherwise bears no resemblance to the novel.
