= Hilary St George Saunders =

British author (1898–1951)

Hilary Aidan Saint George Saunders CBE MC
- Born: 14 January 1898; Clifton
- Died: 16 December 1951 (aged 53)
- Military career
- Allegiance: United Kingdom
- Branch: British Army
- Service years: 1916–1918
- Rank: Lieutenant
- Unit: Welsh Guards
- Conflicts: World War I
- Awards: Military Cross

Hilary Aidan Saint George Saunders CBE MC (14 January 1898 – 16 December 1951) was a British author, born in Clifton near Bristol.

== Early life ==
He was the son of G.W. St George Saunders of Brighton and was educated at Windlesham House School, Downside School and Balliol College, Oxford.

== First World War ==
During World War I he commissioned into the Welsh Guards, and served with 1st battalion on the Western Front. He was awarded the Military Cross for an action on 6 November 1918 near Bavay in northern France. His citation read:

"Lt. Hilary Aidan St. George Saunders, W. Gds. (Spec. Res.), attd. 1st Bn. For conspicuous gallantry and devotion to duty near Bavay on 6th November, 1918. In the attack, after a long fire fight, he led his platoon in a charge against an enemy post, being the first to reach it, and killing two and capturing the remainder of the garrison. The rest of the day he was always well in advance with his platoon, and finally succeeded in consolidating a position further forward than any other part of the battalion line."

== Postwar career ==
Saunders went by several noms-de-plume: Francis Beeding (writing in tandem with John Palmer), "Barum Browne" (with Geoffrey Dennis), "Cornelius Cofyn" (with John deVere Loder), "David Pilgrim" (with John Palmer), and "John Somers" (with John Palmer). A chronicler of World War II and biographer of Robert Baden-Powell, Saunders was a recorder on Admiral Mountbatten's staff during World War II. Saunders was Librarian of the House of Commons Library from 1946 to 1950, when he retired because of ill health.

Saunders became known during World War II for his books and pamphlets, The Battle of Britain, Bomber Command, Coastal Command, etc., which he wrote officially and anonymously for the Government, and subsequently for The Red Beret and The Green Beret. A wartime visit to America for the Ministry of Information was the subject of his Pioneers! O Pioneers! The Sleeping Bacchus is his scarce first and only novel, the story of an art robbery. Saunders was also a postwar commentator on the scouting movements during World War II, chronicled in The Left Handshake, written in 1948.

== Works ==
- The Hidden Kingdom (1927) with John Palmer as Francis Beeding
- The House of Dr. Edwardes (1927) with John Palmer as Francis Beeding
- Death Walks in Eastrepps (1931) with John Palmer as Francis Beeding
- The One Sane Man (1934) with John Palmer as Francis Beeding
- So Great A Man (1937) with John Palmer as David Pilgrim - historical novel about Napoleon.
- No Common Glory (1941) with John Palmer as David Pilgrim - historical novel about the adventures of one of Charles II's illegitimate sons.
- The Grand Design (1943) with John Palmer as David Pilgrim -sequel to No Common Glory
- Combined Operations: The Official story of the Commandos (1943) The MacMillian Company
- Pioneers! O Pioneers! (1944)
- Per Ardua: The Rise of British Air Power, 1911–1939 (1945)
- Saunders, Hilary St. George (1949). The Left Handshake: The Boy Scout Movement during the War, 1939–1945. London: Collins. ASIN B003A06GPK.
- The Green Beret: The Story of the Commandos, Combined Operations, 1940–1945 (1949)
- The Red Beret (1950) OCLC 16214862
- The Middlesex Hospital (1950)
- The Sleeping Bacchus (1951)
