= List of awards and nominations received by Grey's Anatomy =

Grey's Anatomy is an American medical drama which premiered in 2005. The following is a list of awards obtained by the show over the course of its runtime.

== Awards and nominations ==
Award	Year	Category	Nominee(s)	Result	Ref.
ALMA Awards	2007	Outstanding Actress – Television Series	Sara Ramirez	Nominated	
ALMA Awards	2008	Outstanding Actress – Drama Television Series	Sara Ramirez	Nominated	
ALMA Awards	2009	Outstanding Actress – Drama Television Series	Sara Ramirez	Nominated	
ALMA Awards	2011	Favorite TV Actress – Leading Role in a Drama	Sara Ramirez	Nominated	
ALMA Awards	2012	Favorite TV Actress – Supporting Role	Sara Ramirez	Nominated	
American Cinema Editors Awards	2007	Best Edited One-Hour Series for Commercial Television	Edward Ornelas (for "It's the End of the World")	Nominated	
American Film Institute Awards	2005	Television Program of the Year	Grey's Anatomy	Won	
Artios Awards	2005	Best Dramatic Pilot Casting	Linda Lowy (for "A Hard Day's Night")	Nominated	
Artios Awards	2006	Best Dramatic Episodic Casting	Linda Lowy	Won	
BMI Film & TV Awards	2005	BMI TV Music Award	Carim Clasmann and Galia Durant	Won	
Critics' Choice Television Awards	2012	Best Guest Performer in a Drama Series	Loretta Devine	Nominated	
Directors Guild of America Awards	2005	Best Directing – Drama Series, Night	Peter Horton (for "A Hard Day's Night")	Nominated	
Directors Guild of America Awards	2005	Best Directing – Drama Series, Night	Jeffrey Melman (for "Into You Like a Train")	Nominated	
Directors Guild of America Awards	2006	Best Directing – Comedy Series	Seth Mann (for "The Name of the Game")	Nominated	
Directors Guild of America Awards	2006	Best Directing – Drama Series, Night	Peter Horton (for "It's the End of the World")	Nominated	
GLAAD Media Awards	2007	Outstanding Individual Episode	"Where the Boys Are"	Won	
GLAAD Media Awards	2010	Outstanding Drama Series	Grey's Anatomy	Nominated	
GLAAD Media Awards	2011	Outstanding Drama Series	Grey's Anatomy	Nominated	
GLAAD Media Awards	2012	Outstanding Drama Series	Grey's Anatomy	Won	
GLAAD Media Awards	2013	Outstanding Drama Series	Grey's Anatomy	Nominated	
GLAAD Media Awards	2014	Outstanding Drama Series	Grey's Anatomy	Nominated	
GLAAD Media Awards	2015	Outstanding Drama Series	Grey's Anatomy	Nominated	
GLAAD Media Awards	2016	Outstanding Drama Series	Grey's Anatomy	Nominated	
GLAAD Media Awards	2017	Outstanding Drama Series	Grey's Anatomy	Nominated	
GLAAD Media Awards	2019	Outstanding Drama Series	Grey's Anatomy	Nominated	
GLAAD Media Awards	2022	Outstanding Drama Series	Grey's Anatomy	Nominated	
GLAAD Media Awards	2023	Outstanding Drama Series	Grey's Anatomy	Nominated	
Golden Globe Awards	2006	Best Television Series – Drama	Grey's Anatomy	Nominated	
Golden Globe Awards	2006	Best Actor in a Television Series – Drama	Patrick Dempsey	Nominated	
Golden Globe Awards	2006	Best Supporting Actress – Series, Miniseries or Television Film	Sandra Oh	Won	
Golden Globe Awards	2007	Best Television Series – Drama	Grey's Anatomy	Won	
Golden Globe Awards	2007	Best Actor in a Television Series – Drama	Patrick Dempsey	Nominated	
Golden Globe Awards	2007	Best Actress in a Television Series – Drama	Ellen Pompeo	Nominated	
Golden Globe Awards	2007	Best Supporting Actress – Series, Miniseries or Television Film	Katherine Heigl	Nominated	
Golden Globe Awards	2008	Best Television Series – Drama	Grey's Anatomy	Nominated	
Golden Globe Awards	2008	Best Supporting Actress – Series, Miniseries or Television Film	Katherine Heigl	Nominated	
Grammy Awards	2007	Best Compilation Soundtrack Album	Grey's Anatomy: Volume 2	Nominated	
Hollywood Critics Association TV Awards	2022	Best Broadcast Network Series, Drama	Grey's Anatomy	Nominated	
Humanitas Prizes	2010	60 Minute Category	Peter Nowalk (for "Give Peace a Chance")	Nominated	
Humanitas Prizes	2012	60 Minute Category	Stacy McKee (for "White Wedding")	Won	
NAACP Image Awards	2006	Outstanding Drama Series	Grey's Anatomy	Won	
NAACP Image Awards	2006	Outstanding Actor in a Drama Series	Isaiah Washington	Won	
NAACP Image Awards	2006	Outstanding Supporting Actor in a Drama Series	James Pickens Jr.	Nominated	
NAACP Image Awards	2006	Outstanding Supporting Actress in a Drama Series	Chandra Wilson	Nominated	
NAACP Image Awards	2007	Outstanding Drama Series	Grey's Anatomy	Won	
NAACP Image Awards	2007	Outstanding Actor in a Drama Series	Isaiah Washington	Won	
NAACP Image Awards	2007	Outstanding Supporting Actor in a Drama Series	James Pickens Jr.	Nominated	
NAACP Image Awards	2007	Outstanding Supporting Actress in a Drama Series	Chandra Wilson	Won	
NAACP Image Awards	2007	Outstanding Writing in a Drama Series	Shonda Rhimes (for "It's the End of the World" / "As We Know It")	Won	
NAACP Image Awards	2008	Outstanding Drama Series	Grey's Anatomy	Won	
NAACP Image Awards	2008	Outstanding Supporting Actor in a Drama Series	James Pickens Jr.	Nominated	
NAACP Image Awards	2008	Outstanding Supporting Actress in a Drama Series	Chandra Wilson	Won	
NAACP Image Awards	2009	Outstanding Drama Series	Grey's Anatomy	Won	
NAACP Image Awards	2009	Outstanding Actress in a Drama Series	Chandra Wilson	Won	
NAACP Image Awards	2009	Outstanding Supporting Actor in a Drama Series	James Pickens Jr.	Nominated	
NAACP Image Awards	2009	Outstanding Writing in a Drama Series	Shonda Rhimes (for "Freedom Part 1 & 2")	Won	
NAACP Image Awards	2010	Outstanding Drama Series	Grey's Anatomy	Nominated	
NAACP Image Awards	2010	Outstanding Actress in a Drama Series	Sandra Oh	Nominated	
NAACP Image Awards	2010	Outstanding Actress in a Drama Series	Chandra Wilson	Nominated	
NAACP Image Awards	2010	Outstanding Supporting Actor in a Drama Series	James Pickens Jr.	Nominated	
NAACP Image Awards	2010	Outstanding Writing in a Drama Series	Zoanne Clack (for "Stand by Me")	Nominated	
NAACP Image Awards	2010	Outstanding Writing in a Drama Series	Shonda Rhimes (for "What a Difference a Day Makes")	Won	
NAACP Image Awards	2010	Outstanding Directing in a Drama Series	Chandra Wilson (for "Give Peace a Chance")	Won	
NAACP Image Awards	2011	Outstanding Drama Series	Grey's Anatomy	Won	
NAACP Image Awards	2011	Outstanding Actress in a Drama Series	Chandra Wilson	Nominated	
NAACP Image Awards	2011	Outstanding Supporting Actor in a Drama Series	James Pickens Jr.	Nominated	
NAACP Image Awards	2011	Outstanding Supporting Actress in a Drama Series	Sandra Oh	Nominated	
NAACP Image Awards	2011	Outstanding Supporting Actress in a Drama Series	Sara Ramirez	Nominated	
NAACP Image Awards	2012	Outstanding Drama Series	Grey's Anatomy	Nominated	
NAACP Image Awards	2012	Outstanding Actress in a Drama Series	Chandra Wilson	Nominated	
NAACP Image Awards	2012	Outstanding Actress in a Drama Series	Sandra Oh	Nominated	
NAACP Image Awards	2012	Outstanding Supporting Actor in a Drama Series	James Pickens Jr.	Won	
NAACP Image Awards	2012	Outstanding Supporting Actress in a Drama Series	Loretta Devine	Nominated	
NAACP Image Awards	2012	Outstanding Writing in a Drama Series	Zoanne Clack (for "I Will Survive")	Nominated	
NAACP Image Awards	2013	Outstanding Drama Series	Grey's Anatomy	Nominated	
NAACP Image Awards	2013	Outstanding Actress in a Drama Series	Chandra Wilson	Nominated	
NAACP Image Awards	2013	Outstanding Actress in a Drama Series	Sandra Oh	Nominated	
NAACP Image Awards	2013	Outstanding Supporting Actress in a Drama Series	Loretta Devine	Won	
NAACP Image Awards	2013	Outstanding Writing in a Drama Series	Zoanne Clack (for "This Magic Moment")	Nominated	
NAACP Image Awards	2013	Outstanding Writing in a Drama Series	Shonda Rhimes (for "Flight")	Nominated	
NAACP Image Awards	2014	Outstanding Drama Series	Grey's Anatomy	Nominated	
NAACP Image Awards	2014	Outstanding Actress in a Drama Series	Chandra Wilson	Nominated	
NAACP Image Awards	2014	Outstanding Supporting Actor in a Drama Series	James Pickens Jr.	Nominated	
NAACP Image Awards	2014	Outstanding Supporting Actress in a Drama Series	Debbie Allen	Nominated	
NAACP Image Awards	2015	Outstanding Drama Series	Grey's Anatomy	Nominated	
NAACP Image Awards	2015	Outstanding Supporting Actress in a Drama Series	Chandra Wilson	Nominated	
NAACP Image Awards	2017	Outstanding Supporting Actor in a Drama Series	Jesse Williams	Nominated	
NAACP Image Awards	2019	Outstanding Supporting Actor in a Drama Series	Jesse Williams	Won	
NAACP Image Awards	2022	Outstanding Supporting Actress in a Drama Series	Chandra Wilson	Nominated	
People's Choice Awards	2007	Favorite TV Drama	Grey's Anatomy	Won	
People's Choice Awards	2007	Favorite Male TV Star	Patrick Dempsey	Won	
People's Choice Awards	2008	Favorite Male TV Star	Patrick Dempsey	Won	
People's Choice Awards	2008	Favorite Female TV Star	Katherine Heigl	Won	
People's Choice Awards	2008	Favorite Scene Stealing Star	Chandra Wilson	Won	
People's Choice Awards	2009	Favorite TV Drama	Grey's Anatomy	Nominated	
People's Choice Awards	2009	Favorite TV Drama Actor	Patrick Dempsey	Nominated	
People's Choice Awards	2010	Favorite TV Drama	Grey's Anatomy	Nominated	
People's Choice Awards	2010	Favorite TV Drama Actor	Patrick Dempsey	Nominated	
People's Choice Awards	2010	Favorite TV Drama Actress	Katherine Heigl	Nominated	
People's Choice Awards	2011	Favorite TV Drama	Grey's Anatomy	Nominated	
People's Choice Awards	2011	Favorite TV Drama Actor	Patrick Dempsey	Nominated	
People's Choice Awards	2011	Favorite TV Drama Actress	Sandra Oh	Nominated	
People's Choice Awards	2011	Favorite TV Doctor	Patrick Dempsey	Nominated	
People's Choice Awards	2011	Favorite TV Doctor	Sandra Oh	Nominated	
People's Choice Awards	2011	Favorite TV Doctor	Ellen Pompeo	Nominated	
People's Choice Awards	2011	Favorite TV Guest Star	Demi Lovato	Won	
People's Choice Awards	2012	Favorite TV Drama	Grey's Anatomy	Nominated	
People's Choice Awards	2012	Favorite TV Drama Actor	Patrick Dempsey	Nominated	
People's Choice Awards	2012	Favorite TV Drama Actress	Ellen Pompeo	Nominated	
People's Choice Awards	2013	Favorite Network TV Drama	Grey's Anatomy	Won	
People's Choice Awards	2013	Favorite TV Drama Actress	Ellen Pompeo	Won	
People's Choice Awards	2014	Favorite Network TV Drama	Grey's Anatomy	Nominated	
People's Choice Awards	2014	Favorite TV Drama Actor	Patrick Dempsey	Nominated	
People's Choice Awards	2014	Favorite TV Drama Actress	Sandra Oh	Nominated	
People's Choice Awards	2014	Favorite TV Gal Pals	Ellen Pompeo and Sandra Oh	Nominated	
People's Choice Awards	2014	Favorite On-Screen Chemistry	Ellen Pompeo and Patrick Dempsey	Nominated	
People's Choice Awards	2015	Favorite Network TV Drama	Grey's Anatomy	Won	
People's Choice Awards	2015	Favorite Dramatic TV Actor	Justin Chambers	Nominated	
People's Choice Awards	2015	Favorite Dramatic TV Actor	Patrick Dempsey	Won	
People's Choice Awards	2015	Favorite Dramatic TV Actor	Jesse Williams	Nominated	
People's Choice Awards	2015	Favorite Dramatic TV Actress	Ellen Pompeo	Won	
People's Choice Awards	2015	Favorite TV Character We Miss Most	Sandra Oh	Won	
People's Choice Awards	2016	Favorite TV Show	Grey's Anatomy	Nominated	
People's Choice Awards	2016	Favorite Network TV Drama	Grey's Anatomy	Won	
People's Choice Awards	2016	Favorite Dramatic TV Actor	Justin Chambers	Nominated	
People's Choice Awards	2016	Favorite Dramatic TV Actor	Jesse Williams	Nominated	
People's Choice Awards	2016	Favorite Dramatic TV Actress	Ellen Pompeo	Won	
People's Choice Awards	2016	Favorite Dramatic TV Actress	Sara Ramirez	Nominated	
People's Choice Awards	2017	Favorite TV Show	Grey's Anatomy	Nominated	
People's Choice Awards	2017	Favorite Network TV Drama	Grey's Anatomy	Won	
People's Choice Awards	2017	Favorite Dramatic TV Actor	Justin Chambers	Won	
People's Choice Awards	2017	Favorite Dramatic TV Actor	Jesse Williams	Nominated	
People's Choice Awards	2017	Favorite Dramatic TV Actress	Ellen Pompeo	Nominated	
People's Choice Awards	2018	The Show of 2018	Grey's Anatomy	Nominated	
People's Choice Awards	2018	The Drama Show of 2018	Grey's Anatomy	Nominated	
People's Choice Awards	2018	The Male TV Star of 2018	Justin Chambers	Nominated	
People's Choice Awards	2018	The Male TV Star of 2018	Jesse Williams	Nominated	
People's Choice Awards	2018	The Female TV Star of 2018	Ellen Pompeo	Nominated	
People's Choice Awards	2018	The Drama TV Star of 2018	Ellen Pompeo	Nominated	
People's Choice Awards	2019	The Show of 2019	Grey's Anatomy	Nominated	
People's Choice Awards	2019	The Drama Show of 2019	Grey's Anatomy	Nominated	
People's Choice Awards	2020	The Show of 2020	Grey's Anatomy	Won	
People's Choice Awards	2020	The Drama Show of 2020	Grey's Anatomy	Nominated	
People's Choice Awards	2020	The Male TV Star of 2020	Jesse Williams	Nominated	
People's Choice Awards	2020	The Female TV Star of 2020	Ellen Pompeo	Won	
People's Choice Awards	2020	The Drama TV Star of 2020	Ellen Pompeo	Nominated	
People's Choice Awards	2021	The Show of 2021	Grey's Anatomy	Nominated	
People's Choice Awards	2021	The Drama Show of 2021	Grey's Anatomy	Won	
People's Choice Awards	2021	The Female TV Star of 2021	Ellen Pompeo	Won	
People's Choice Awards	2021	The Drama TV Star of 2021	Ellen Pompeo	Nominated	
People's Choice Awards	2022	The Show of 2022	Grey's Anatomy	Nominated	
People's Choice Awards	2022	The Drama Show of 2022	Grey's Anatomy	Won	
People's Choice Awards	2022	The Female TV Star of 2022	Ellen Pompeo	Won	
People's Choice Awards	2022	The Drama TV Star of 2022	Ellen Pompeo	Nominated	
Primetime Emmy Awards	2005	Outstanding Supporting Actress in a Drama Series	Sandra Oh	Nominated	
Primetime Emmy Awards	2005	Outstanding Directing for a Drama Series	Peter Horton (for "A Hard Day's Night")	Nominated	
Primetime Emmy Awards	2006	Outstanding Drama Series	Shonda Rhimes, James D. Parriott, Betsy Beers, Mark Gordon, Peter Horton, Krista Vernoff, Mark Wilding, Gabrielle G. Stanton, Harry Werksman, Mimi Schmir, Kip Koenig, Joan Rater, Tony Phelan, and Rob Corn	Nominated	
Primetime Emmy Awards	2006	Outstanding Supporting Actress in a Drama Series	Sandra Oh	Nominated	
Primetime Emmy Awards	2006	Outstanding Supporting Actress in a Drama Series	Chandra Wilson	Nominated	
Primetime Emmy Awards	2006	Outstanding Writing for a Drama Series	Shonda Rhimes (for "It's the End of the World" / "As We Know It")	Nominated	
Primetime Emmy Awards	2006	Outstanding Writing for a Drama Series	Krista Vernoff (for "Into You Like a Train")	Nominated	
Primetime Emmy Awards	2007	Outstanding Drama Series	Shonda Rhimes, Betsy Beers, Mark Gordon, Peter Horton, Krista Vernoff, Mark Wilding, Allan Heinberg, Joan Rater, Tony Phelan, Rob Corn, Debora Cahn, Kip Koenig, and Linda Klein	Nominated	
Primetime Emmy Awards	2007	Outstanding Supporting Actor in a Drama Series	T. R. Knight	Nominated	
Primetime Emmy Awards	2007	Outstanding Supporting Actress in a Drama Series	Katherine Heigl	Won	
Primetime Emmy Awards	2007	Outstanding Supporting Actress in a Drama Series	Sandra Oh	Nominated	
Primetime Emmy Awards	2007	Outstanding Supporting Actress in a Drama Series	Chandra Wilson	Nominated	
Primetime Emmy Awards	2008	Outstanding Supporting Actress in a Drama Series	Sandra Oh	Nominated	
Primetime Emmy Awards	2008	Outstanding Supporting Actress in a Drama Series	Chandra Wilson	Nominated	
Primetime Emmy Awards	2009	Outstanding Supporting Actress in a Drama Series	Sandra Oh	Nominated	
Primetime Emmy Awards	2009	Outstanding Supporting Actress in a Drama Series	Chandra Wilson	Nominated	
Primetime Creative Arts Emmy Awards	2005	Outstanding Casting for a Drama Series	Linda Lowy and John Brace	Nominated	
Primetime Creative Arts Emmy Awards	2006	Outstanding Casting for a Drama Series	Linda Lowy and John Brace	Won	
Primetime Creative Arts Emmy Awards	2006	Outstanding Guest Actor in a Drama Series	Kyle Chandler (for "It's the End of the World" / "As We Know It")	Nominated	
Primetime Creative Arts Emmy Awards	2006	Outstanding Guest Actress in a Drama Series	Kate Burton (for "Make Me Lose Control")	Nominated	
Primetime Creative Arts Emmy Awards	2006	Outstanding Guest Actress in a Drama Series	Christina Ricci (for "It's the End of the World" / "As We Know It")	Nominated	
Primetime Creative Arts Emmy Awards	2006	Outstanding Makeup for a Series (Non-Prosthetic)	Norman T. Leavitt, Brigitte Bugayong, Thomas R. Burman, and Bari Dreiband-Burman (for "Owner of a Lonely Heart")	Nominated	
Primetime Creative Arts Emmy Awards	2006	Outstanding Prosthetic Makeup for a Series, Miniseries, Movie or a Special	Norman T. Leavitt, Brigitte Bugayong, Thomas R. Burman, and Bari Dreiband-Burman (for "Yesterday")	Nominated	
Primetime Creative Arts Emmy Awards	2007	Outstanding Casting for a Drama Series	Linda Lowy and John Brace	Nominated	
Primetime Creative Arts Emmy Awards	2007	Outstanding Guest Actress in a Drama Series	Kate Burton (for "Wishin' and Hopin'")	Nominated	
Primetime Creative Arts Emmy Awards	2007	Outstanding Guest Actress in a Drama Series	Elizabeth Reaser (for "My Favorite Mistake")	Nominated	
Primetime Creative Arts Emmy Awards	2007	Outstanding Prosthetic Makeup for a Series, Miniseries, Movie or a Special	Norman T. Leavitt, Brigitte Bugayong, Thomas R. Burman, and Bari Dreiband-Burman (for "My Favorite Mistake")	Nominated	
Primetime Creative Arts Emmy Awards	2007	Outstanding Special Visual Effects for a Series	Sam Nicholson, Valeri Pfahning, Scott Ramsey, Anthony Ocampo, Michael Cook, Diego Galtieri, Eric Grenaudier, Adalberto Al Lopez, and Jason Gustafson (for "Walk on Water")	Nominated	
Primetime Creative Arts Emmy Awards	2008	Outstanding Guest Actress in a Drama Series	Diahann Carroll (for "Love/Addiction")	Nominated	
Primetime Creative Arts Emmy Awards	2008	Outstanding Makeup for a Single-Camera Series (Non-Prosthetic)	Norman T. Leavitt, Brigitte Bugayong, Shauna Giesbrecht, and Michele Teleis-Fickle (for "Crash Into Me: Part 1 & 2")	Nominated	
Primetime Creative Arts Emmy Awards	2008	Outstanding Prosthetic Makeup for a Series, Miniseries, Movie or a Special	Norman T. Leavitt, Brigitte Bugayong, Thomas R. Burman, and Bari Dreiband-Burman (for "Forever Young")	Nominated	
Primetime Creative Arts Emmy Awards	2009	Outstanding Guest Actress in a Drama Series	Sharon Lawrence (for "No Good at Saying Sorry (One More Chance)")	Nominated	
Primetime Creative Arts Emmy Awards	2009	Outstanding Makeup for a Single-Camera Series (Non-Prosthetic)	Norman T. Leavitt, Brigitte Bugayong, and Michele Teleis (for "Dream a Little Dream of Me: Part 1 & 2")	Nominated	
Primetime Creative Arts Emmy Awards	2009	Outstanding Prosthetic Makeup for a Series, Miniseries, Movie or a Special	Norman T. Leavitt, Vincent Van Dyke, Thomas R. Burman, and Bari Dreiband-Burman (for "Stand by Me")	Nominated	
Primetime Creative Arts Emmy Awards	2010	Outstanding Makeup for a Single-Camera Series (Non-Prosthetic)	Norman T. Leavitt, Brigitte Bugayong, and Michele Teleis (for "Suicide Is Painless")	Won	
Primetime Creative Arts Emmy Awards	2010	Outstanding Prosthetic Makeup for a Series, Miniseries, Movie or a Special	Norman T. Leavitt, Bari Dreiband-Burman, Thom Floutz, Bart Mixon, Vincent Van Dyke, and Thomas R. Burman (for "How Insensitive")	Nominated	
Primetime Creative Arts Emmy Awards	2011	Outstanding Guest Actress in a Drama Series	Loretta Devine (for "This Is How We Do It")	Won	
Primetime Creative Arts Emmy Awards	2011	Outstanding Prosthetic Makeup for a Series, Miniseries, Movie or a Special	Norman T. Leavitt, Thom Floutz, Bari Dreiband-Burman, Sue LaPrelle, Ed French, Vincent Van Dyke, and Thomas R. Burman (for "Superfreak")	Nominated	
Primetime Creative Arts Emmy Awards	2012	Outstanding Guest Actress in a Drama Series	Loretta Devine (for "If Only You Were Lonely")	Nominated	
PRISM Awards	2008	Performance in a Drama Series Episode	Justin Chambers	Nominated	
PRISM Awards	2009	Performance in a Drama Multi-Episode Storyline	Justin Chambers	Nominated	
PRISM Awards	2009	Performance in a Drama Multi-Episode Storyline	Elizabeth Reaser	Nominated	
Producers Guild of America Awards	2005	Television Producer of the Year Award in Episodic Drama	Mark Gordon, Shonda Rhimes, James D. Parriott, Betsy Beers, Peter Horton, and Rob Corn	Nominated	
Producers Guild of America Awards	2006	Television Producer of the Year Award in Episodic Drama	Mark Gordon, Shonda Rhimes, James D. Parriott, Betsy Beers, Peter Horton, and Rob Corn	Won	
Producers Guild of America Awards	2007	Television Producer of the Year Award in Episodic Drama	Mark Gordon, Shonda Rhimes, James D. Parriott, Betsy Beers, Peter Horton, and Rob Corn	Nominated	
Satellite Awards	2005	Best Television Series – Drama	Grey's Anatomy	Nominated	
Satellite Awards	2005	Best Supporting Actress – Series, Miniseries or TV Film	Sandra Oh	Nominated	
Satellite Awards	2006	Best Cast – Television Series	Grey's Anatomy	Won	
Satellite Awards	2007	Best Television Series – Drama	Grey's Anatomy	Nominated	
Satellite Awards	2007	Best Actress – Drama Series	Ellen Pompeo	Won	
Satellite Awards	2007	Best Supporting Actor – Series, Miniseries or TV Film	T. R. Knight	Nominated	
Satellite Awards	2007	Best Supporting Actress – Series, Miniseries or TV Film	Chandra Wilson	Nominated	
Satellite Awards	2008	Best Supporting Actress – Series, Miniseries or TV Film	Chandra Wilson	Nominated	
Screen Actors Guild Awards	2005	Outstanding Performance by an Ensemble in a Drama Series	Grey's Anatomy	Nominated	
Screen Actors Guild Awards	2005	Outstanding Performance by a Male Actor in a Drama Series	Patrick Dempsey	Nominated	
Screen Actors Guild Awards	2005	Outstanding Performance by a Female Actor in a Drama Series	Sandra Oh	Won	
Screen Actors Guild Awards	2006	Outstanding Performance by an Ensemble in a Drama Series	Justin Chambers, Patrick Dempsey, Katherine Heigl, T. R. Knight, Sandra Oh, James Pickens Jr., Ellen Pompeo, Kate Walsh, Isaiah Washington, and Chandra Wilson	Won	
Screen Actors Guild Awards	2006	Outstanding Performance by a Female Actor in a Drama Series	Chandra Wilson	Won	
Screen Actors Guild Awards	2007	Outstanding Performance by an Ensemble in a Drama Series	Justin Chambers, Eric Dane, Patrick Dempsey, Katherine Heigl, T. R. Knight, Sandra Oh, James Pickens Jr., Ellen Pompeo, Sara Ramirez, Kate Walsh, Isaiah Washington, and Chandra Wilson	Nominated	
Teen Choice Awards	2005	Choice TV Show: Drama	Grey's Anatomy	Nominated	
Teen Choice Awards	2005	Choice TV: Male Breakout Star	Justin Chambers	Nominated	
Teen Choice Awards	2005	Choice TV: Female Breakout Star	Ellen Pompeo	Nominated	
Teen Choice Awards	2006	Choice TV Show: Action/Drama	Grey's Anatomy	Nominated	
Teen Choice Awards	2006	Choice TV Actor: Action/Drama	Patrick Dempsey	Nominated	
Teen Choice Awards	2006	Choice TV Actress: Action/Drama	Katherine Heigl	Nominated	
Teen Choice Awards	2006	Choice TV: Actress	Ellen Pompeo	Nominated	
Teen Choice Awards	2006	Choice TV: Chemistry	Grey's Anatomy	Nominated	
Teen Choice Awards	2007	Choice TV Show: Drama	Grey's Anatomy	Won	
Teen Choice Awards	2007	Choice TV Actress: Drama	Katherine Heigl	Nominated	
Teen Choice Awards	2008	Choice TV Show: Drama	Grey's Anatomy	Nominated	
Teen Choice Awards	2008	Choice TV Actor: Drama	Patrick Dempsey	Nominated	
Teen Choice Awards	2008	Choice TV Actress: Drama	Katherine Heigl	Nominated	
Teen Choice Awards	2009	Choice TV Show: Drama	Grey's Anatomy	Nominated	
Teen Choice Awards	2010	Choice TV Show: Drama	Grey's Anatomy	Nominated	
Teen Choice Awards	2015	Choice TV Show: Drama	Grey's Anatomy	Nominated	
Teen Choice Awards	2016	Choice TV Show: Drama	Grey's Anatomy	Nominated	
Teen Choice Awards	2017	Choice Drama TV Actor	Jesse Williams	Nominated	
Teen Choice Awards	2018	Choice Drama TV Actor	Jesse Williams	Nominated	
Television Critics Association Awards	2006	Program of the Year	Grey's Anatomy	Won	
Television Critics Association Awards	2006	Outstanding Achievement in Drama	Grey's Anatomy	Nominated	
TV Land Awards	2006	Future Classic Award	Grey's Anatomy	Won	
Writers Guild of America Awards	2006	Television: New Series	Grey's Anatomy	Won	
Writers Guild of America Awards	2006	Television: Dramatic Series	Grey's Anatomy	Nominated	
Writers Guild of America Awards	2007	Television: Dramatic Series	Grey's Anatomy	Nominated	
