= Grey's Anatomy season 2 =

Season of television series

Grey's Anatomy
- Season 2
- DVD cover art for the second season of Grey's Anatomy
- Showrunners: James Parriott; Shonda Rhimes; Krista Vernoff
- Starring: Ellen Pompeo; Sandra Oh; Katherine Heigl; Justin Chambers; T. R. Knight; Chandra Wilson; James Pickens Jr.; Kate Walsh; Isaiah Washington; Patrick Dempsey
- No. of episodes: 27

Release
- Original network: ABC
- Original release: September 25, 2005 – May 15, 2006

Season chronology
- ← Previous; Season 1 Next → Season 3

The second season of the American television medical drama Grey's Anatomy commenced airing on the American Broadcasting Company (ABC) channel on September 25, 2005, and concluded on May 15, 2006. Shonda Rhimes was the series' showrunner and executive producer. Actors Ellen Pompeo, Sandra Oh, Katherine Heigl, Justin Chambers, and T. R. Knight reprised their roles as surgical interns Meredith Grey, Cristina Yang, Izzie Stevens, Alex Karev, and George O'Malley respectively. Previous main cast members Chandra Wilson, James Pickens Jr., Isaiah Washington and Patrick Dempsey also returned, while Kate Walsh, who began the season in a recurring capacity, was promoted to series-regular status.

The season continued to focus on the surgical residency of five young interns as they try to balance the challenges of their competitive careers with difficulties in their personal lives. It was set in the fictional Seattle Grace Hospital, located in the city of Seattle, Washington. Whereas the first season put the emphasis mainly on the unexpected impact the surgical field has on the main characters, the second season provided a detailed perspective on the personal background of each character, focusing on the consequences that their decisions have on their careers. Throughout the season new storylines were introduced, including the love-triangle between Meredith Grey, Derek Shepherd, and Addison Montgomery, this being the main arc of the season. Also heavily developed was the storyline involving Izzie Stevens' relationship with patient Denny Duquette, which resulted in high critical acclaim and positive fan response.

The show ended its second season with 21.07 million total viewers and a 6.9 ratings share in the 18–49 demographic. The season opened to high critical acclaim, as most agreed on a significant improvement in storylines. The season saw numerous cast and crew members receive awards and nominations at ceremonies like the 58th Primetime Emmy Awards and the 64th Golden Globe Awards. Katherine Heigl and Chandra Wilson were the cast members with the most nominations for their portrayals of Izzie Stevens and Miranda Bailey, respectively. The series was chosen in the top 10 for several 2006 "best of television" lists, including USA Today, San Jose Mercury News, TV Guide, and Orlando Sentinel. The website Screen Rant ranked the season at number one on their 2023 ranking of the 19 Grey's Anatomy seasons that had aired at the time. Containing 27 episodes, out of which four were originally produced for the first season, it is the longest season to date.

== Episodes ==
Each episode of this season is named after a song.

No. overall	No. in season	Title	Directed by	Written by	Original release date	Prod. code	U.S. viewers (millions)
10	1	"Raindrops Keep Falling on My Head"	Peter Horton	Stacy McKee	September 25, 2005	110	18.98
Joe the bartender collapses in the bar and finds himself in the need of a very expensive standstill surgery that there is no way he'll be able to afford. Much to Meredith's discomfort, Addison requests her as her intern for the day. Still recovering from surgery, Dr. Webber asks George to be his "eyes and ears", but George finds it difficult to pass on any information. Cristina tells Meredith that she is pregnant without revealing the father. When Burke breaks off their relationship, she decides not to tell him either. Izzie and Alex's personal bond grows closer as he shows a more emotional side of himself.
11	2	"Enough Is Enough" "Enough Is Enough (No More Tears)"	Peter Horton	James D. Parriott	October 2, 2005	201	17.57
Adele cuts her vacation short to come and care for Dr. Webber, who is still recovering from surgery. Cristina and Meredith both express a great deal of bitterness toward their past doctoral flames. After having worked with nurse Olivia all day, George admits that he likes someone else. Cristina, Alex and Izzie treat the victims from a car crash where the father needs a liver transplant, but his son doesn't want to donate because of the way his father abuses his mother. Meredith and Bailey treat a man who has swallowed the heads of ten Judy dolls. George consults Derek when he believes that an organ donor is still alive.
12	3	"Make Me Lose Control"	Adam Davidson	Krista Vernoff	October 9, 2005	111	18.12
Ellis Grey is brought into the hospital for possible diverticulitis, and her Alzheimer's condition becomes known to everyone. George is assigned to her case, but she refuses to let him treat her, believing he is her ex-husband Thatcher Grey. Alex and Meredith treat a young patient with an extreme blushing condition. Izzie defends her blossoming friendship with Alex to the others. Addison and Izzie try and save the life of a premature baby who was abandoned. To Burke's shock, Cristina collapses in the O.R. and Addison has to remove her Fallopian tube, causing her baby to be aborted and Burke to find out that she was pregnant. Meredith tells Derek that hating him is exhausting and that she doesn't want to do it anymore.
13	4	"Deny, Deny, Deny"	Wendey Stanzler	Zoanne Clack	October 16, 2005	112	18.28
Cristina is still recovering from her surgery while receiving a visit from her mother. Not wanting to rest in bed, she uninvitedly diagnoses Burke and Izzie's patient with Münchhausen syndrome. Eager to seem fine, Cristina has refused to mourn all day, but in the end, she breaks down. Addison gives Derek divorce papers to sign, but he can't make up his mind. Alex asks Izzie on a date, but before their date he learns that he failed one of his medical board exams and will have to retake it and pass or give up surgery. Alex and Derek treat a man who claims to have shot himself in the head. Bailey treats a patient with cystic fibrosis who is very important to her and has been her patient since she was an intern. Ellis is still in the hospital and believes she is there working. George has been assigned to watch her but he keeps losing her.
14	5	"Bring the Pain"	Mark Tinker	Shonda Rhimes	October 23, 2005	113	18.00
Meredith and Derek have to use more than medicine when a young Hmong woman's traditionalist, religious father forbids her to have a life-saving operation unless a shaman is called upon to "retrieve her souls". George and Alex are trapped in an elevator with a patient in critical condition after a gunshot wound to the heart. Burke tells them they must perform the surgery in the elevator because there is not enough time to try to get to the OR. Burke hands Alex the scalpel through the elevator door, but Alex freezes. George steps up and successfully gets the patient to a stable condition and the rescue team gets them out. Izzie treats an old lady who seemingly has a heart attack on the same day every year, whilst Cristina treats a man who has to watch porn to handle his pain, and has to come up with a different way to manage it when the power cuts. Derek struggles with his decision to either try to repair his marriage with Addison or divorce her and start a new life with Meredith. After trying to play it cool, Meredith breaks down and asks Derek to choose her. Ellis is discharged from the hospital.
15	6	"Into You Like a Train"	Jeff Melman	Krista Vernoff	October 30, 2005	202	16.67
Meredith nervously awaits a final decision from Derek at Joe's bar, but her fear is interrupted when a train crash brings several seriously injured patients to the hospital and the interns are paged back to work. Two patients were seriously injured in the train crash and were both impaled by a long pole and are stuck together face to face. The doctors must make a tough decision because they realize that only one patient can survive the surgery. Meredith realizes that Derek has chosen Addison, and she is crushed. Alex fails to notice the friend of his patient is bleeding internally and she eventually dies from her injuries. Cristina works on a foot that has been sliced off of a patient, however things get complicated when she and Webber realize that it does not belong to who they thought it did. Addison and Izzie work with two pregnant women who are best friends. Addison sees great potential in Izzie, who must decide whether her loyalty as Meredith's friend outweighs professional gain. Derek clears Webber for surgery.
16	7	"Something to Talk About"	Adam Davidson	Stacy McKee	November 6, 2005	203	18.13
Cristina, Izzie and Meredith aggressively pursue the case of Shane, a male patient who seems to have a hysterical pregnancy, which fascinates the entire medical staff. Meredith becomes angry because everyone in the hospital is treating the patient like a sideshow and invading his privacy. She relates to him because the entire hospital staff seems to be gossiping about her and Derek. A sheltered young patient inspires Alex to better express his feelings for Izzie. Alex finds her at Joe's and sweeps her into a dramatic kiss that knocks her socks off. George and Burke treat a patient with extensive scar tissue around her heart, who is constantly complaining at her husband. Burke and Cristina discuss whether to go public about their relationship, whilst Addison and Derek encounter hurdles as they attempt to rebuild theirs.
17	8	"Let It Be"	Lesli Linka Glatter	Mimi Schmir	November 13, 2005	204	19.74
Derek and Addison Shepherd's professional relationship is challenged when their friends from Manhattan come to Seattle Grace seeking a radical, preemptive operation to avoid breast and ovarian cancer. Meanwhile, George can't understand why a patient who fell five stories doesn't seem happy to have survived, and an elderly gentleman makes a difficult decision upon learning that his wife has only a few months to live. Cristina and Burke try to have a "normal" date, but the event takes a change after someone collapses in the restaurant. Dr. Webber is disappointed by Bailey's fellowship decision -- until he learns her reason: that she is pregnant. Guest star: Shelley Berman
18	9	"Thanks for the Memories"	Michael Dinner	Shonda Rhimes	November 20, 2005	205	20.33
The Thanksgiving holiday is more difficult for the interns and residents than any of them is willing to admit, as Izzie plans a big dinner. George endures the family tradition of hunting turkeys with his father and brothers. Having sneaked off to the hospital instead of helping Izzie out, Meredith treats a patient who has been in a vegetative state for 16 years. Addison asks Derek to have sex with her again, but he stands her up to help with Meredith's patient. Burke helps Izzie to prepare the Thanksgiving meal. Just as Izzie is about to give up on anyone showing up for dinner, Alex shows up after having initial reluctance, George and Cristina come back, while Meredith celebrates with a one-night stand at Joe's bar.
19	10	"Much too Much"	Wendey Stanzler	Gabrielle Stanton & Harry Werksman, Jr.	November 27, 2005	206	19.59
Meredith is mortified when her one-night stand shows up at the hospital suffering from priapism and needing medical attention. Izzie, Addison and Derek are assigned to a case where a woman carrying quintuplets is overwhelmed by numerous medical issues as she navigates her high-risk pregnancy. Alex's shortcomings frustrate Izzie, especially when she catches Alex and Olivia having sex. On the other hand, Alex again shows his incompetence in treating one of his patients by administering the wrong dosage. Cristina reluctantly shows Burke where she lives.
20	11	"Owner of a Lonely Heart"	Daniel Minahan	Mark Wilding	December 4, 2005	207	20.59
Cristina has little sympathy for Constance Ferguson, a prison inmate who jeopardizes her health just to get out of solitary confinement. The interns all keep careful watch on the family of premature quintuplets with a variety of serious health challenges. Derek and Addison argue over their living arrangements. George treats a man by using leeches, whilst Alex continues to treat the patient he accidentally put into a coma. Addison decides to teach Izzie a very painful lesson which she too once received from the chief, wanting Izzie to know the consequences of being too attached to her patients. Izzie argues with Meredith after seeing her help Alex, and to mend their friendship they buy a dog together.
21	12	"Grandma Got Run Over by a Reindeer"	Peter Horton	Krista Vernoff	December 11, 2005	208	15.70
A young boy needs a heart transplant but does not seem to want it, and an argument over his treatment exposes major philosophical differences between Burke and Cristina. Meanwhile, when the interns rally to help Alex prepare to re-take his exam, Izzie feels betrayed and Meredith has to remind her of the true spirit of the Christmas holiday. George has to deal with the family of a woman whose surgery for bleeding ulcers keeps getting postponed for more important surgeries, much to their contempt, whilst Bailey has to perform several surgeries when Webber is forced to leave her on her own. Derek performs brain surgery on the patriarch of a mixed Jewish/Christian family who discuss celebrating Chrismukkah, but is not in a festive mood despite a reconciliation with his wife.
22	13	"Begin the Begin"	Jessica Yu	Kip Koenig	January 15, 2006	209	18.97
Dr. Webber enforces an 80-hour-per-week maximum rule for the interns. Derek wants to enroll Ellis in an experimental treatment for Alzheimer's, but Meredith does not want his help and Derek needs Dr. Webber to intervene. Alex treats a writer who ate his entire novel. Izzie seems to be getting over Alex when she shares an undeniable chemistry with Denny Duquette, a patient awaiting a heart transplant. Bailey goes to retrieve Denny's heart, taking Cristina along for the ride. Meanwhile, George and Addison treat Bex, a young teen who is intersex.
23	14	"Tell Me Sweet Little Lies"	Adam Davidson	Tony Phelan & Joan Rater	January 22, 2006	210	21.04
The truth is in short supply as Meredith and Cristina lie to each other about the status of their relationships. Derek and Cristina treat a guitarist who lost three of his fingers, but she is angry with Derek since he has Meredith calling him McDreamy again. Meredith and Burke treat a recently married woman with persistent heart problems, whose happiness turns out to be a symptom. Cristina 'kinda' moves in with Burke, but she still has her apartment. George threatens to move out over Meredith's dog and in the end Meredith reluctantly gives him to Derek and Addison. George is given the unpleasant task of discharging an elderly patient who refuses to leave the hospital despite no longer being sick. Bailey, Alex and Izzie treat a competitive eater who presents with a tear in the lining of her esophagus. Alex is so nervous about the results of his exam that he eventually asks Izzie to open them for him. Bailey is put on maternity leave.
24	15	"Break on Through"	David Paymer	Zoanne Clack	January 29, 2006	211	18.44
Amidst a strike by the nurses, Meredith revives an elderly patient without knowing she is not supposed to. As the patient dies with her friends at her side, Meredith realizes she does not want her mother to die alone, and allows the chief to continue visit her, something she initially was upset with. George ends up on the nurses' side. Izzie treats a pregnant teenager with whom she has much in common, and her interfering upsets the patient's mother, Izzie also reveals to the patient that she has a daughter. Cristina is irritated with the perky new resident, Sydney, and asks for Burke's intervention when Sydney attempts a risky procedure to save a woman's infected leg from amputation. Absent: Chandra Wilson as Miranda Bailey due to maternity leave
25	16	"It's the End of the World"	Peter Horton	Shonda Rhimes	February 5, 2006	212	37.88
Meredith has a feeling and George and Izzie have to call in Cristina to get her out of bed. A paramedic brings in a man with live ammunition in his chest; the paramedic's hand is the only thing preventing an explosion. Bailey goes into labor and Derek and Cristina perform surgery on Bailey's husband, who crashed the car on his way in. Izzie initiates things with Alex. When the anesthesiologist leaves the paramedic alone in the O.R., she panics and pulls her hand out of the patient – but Meredith takes her place.
26	17	"As We Know It"	Peter Horton	Shonda Rhimes	February 12, 2006	213	25.42
Without her husband by her side, Bailey refuses to have the baby and George works with Addison to convince her to. George also treats the paramedic who fled after finding her hiding in a stairwell. Dr. Webber's stress causes an anxiety attack that brings Adele to the hospital. Meredith removes the explosive from the patient, but it explodes and kills Dylan, the chief of the bomb squad. Burke and Derek overcome their initial rivalry and call each other by their first names. Cristina says "I love you, too" to a sleeping Burke. Derek visits Meredith after she nearly dies and Meredith tells him that she cannot remember their last kiss.
27	18	"Yesterday"	Rob Corn	Story by : Mimi Schmir; Teleplay by : Krista Vernoff	February 19, 2006	214	24.36
Dr. Mark Sloan arrives in Seattle to try to convince Addison to continue their relationship, and is greeted with a punch from Derek when Mark introduces himself to Meredith. Dr. Webber allows Sloan to assist Derek in a risky surgery to fix a teenage patient with facial tumors. Burke learns that Cristina still leases her apartment. Izzie treats a patient with spontaneous orgasms. Meredith treats a man who believes he is going to die so he has her record him saying hateful things to everyone he knows. Later, Meredith goes to see her father for the first time in twenty years and is left unsatisfied with his answers about the past. George finally tells Meredith how he feels about her.
28	19	"What Have I Done to Deserve This?"	Wendey Stanzler	Stacy McKee	February 26, 2006	215	24.76
Following their sexual encounter, Meredith and George avoid each other at work, and George ends up falling down a stairwell and dislocating his shoulder. Frequent heart patient Denny is readmitted and grows closer to Izzie, causing Alex to be jealous. Meredith, Derek, and Alex treat a kid with a head injury. Burke, Cristina, and George treat a man about to get married who has an aortic aneurysm. Bailey's maternity leave is disrupted when Addison secretly asks her to help treat her allergic reaction to poison oak. George moves in with Burke and Cristina and catches the eye of ortho resident Dr. Callie Torres.
29	20	"Band-Aid Covers the Bullet Hole"	Julie Anne Robinson	Gabrielle Stanton & Harry Werksman, Jr.	March 12, 2006	216	22.51
After Dr. Bailey is called into surgery, Cristina is forced to watch baby Tucker for the remainder of the day. Meanwhile, George and Meredith are still on the outs as she confides in Derek with her problem. Meredith treats a woman (guest appearance by Natalie Cole) with a fork stuck in her neck. Alex tells Denny he and Izzie are sleeping together. Izzie continues to warm up to Denny, who is having problems breathing. George and Callie further their flirtations over a teenage patient who decides to chop off his own finger after Callie refuses to do it for him. Addison treats a pregnant woman whose husband keeps hitting on her. Burke shows a preference for living with George over Cristina, and Addison gets a long-awaited admission from Derek that shows some hope for their marriage after all.
30	21	"Superstition"	Tricia Brock	James D. Parriott	March 19, 2006	217	21.13
When a series of deaths occur at Seattle Grace, the uncanny events bring out the doctors' superstitious sides. Four deaths in the morning implies that three more deaths are due for the day. This makes Izzie nervous about Denny's surgery, and a jealous Alex informs Denny of the likelihood of his death, prompting Izzie to completely end their relationship. Meredith and Bailey treat a woman who claims to have been struck by lightning, but the patient keeps lying about the true cause of the injury. Cristina treats a patient in a car accident who has OCD. Meanwhile, Derek and Addison discuss making a more permanent living arrangement, and Dr. Webber treats a former sponsor from his Alcoholics Anonymous group. George is tasked with stealing back one of Burke's caps from Cristina. Izzie kisses Denny after he survives his surgery.
31	22	"The Name of the Game"	Seith Mann	Blythe Robe	April 2, 2006	218	22.35
Bailey worries Dr. Webber is mommy-tracking her and becomes Derek's intern for the day. George begins a relationship with Callie and finds her living in the hospital. Meredith takes up knitting—and a vow of celibacy. Cristina competes with Webber during classroom exercises. Burke tries to teach Alex a lesson about bedside manner, but it is a lesson that falls on deaf ears. Izzie tries to get George to move back into the house. George discovers that his and Addison's patient is Meredith's half-sister. Meredith meets Doc's vet, and takes a shine to him.
32	23	"Blues for Sister Someone"	Jeff Melman	Elizabeth Klaviter	April 30, 2006	219	20.76
Izzie grills George about the personal details of his life, and under instructions from Derek, tries to get a divorce lawyer to have a seizure so he can operate on her. Addison and Alex treat a pregnant woman who is expecting her seventh child, and face a difficult decision when the woman requests her tubes be tied off-record in order for her to avoid telling her very religious husband that she does not want to have any more children. Burke performs surgery on his musical hero who wants a pacemaker removed as it has ruined his ability to play the violin. Meredith learns from Denny that life is too short to follow the rules, and decides to abandon her knitting and accept a date with Doc's vet. George moves back in with Izzie and Meredith. Derek finally agrees to have hot sex with Addison.
33	24	"Damage Case"	Tony Goldwyn	Mimi Schmir	May 7, 2006	220	21.99
A family is involved in a car accident caused by a surgical intern from another hospital. The young pregnant wife has massive injuries and eventually dies, though Alex performs a Caesarean section to save the baby. Derek is angry at Meredith after he sees her at the vet's. Burke is angry at Cristina after she fell asleep during sex that morning. George does not stand up for Callie to his roommates and Denny is becoming angry at being stuck in bed with no end in sight.
34	25	"17 Seconds"	Daniel Minahan	Mark Wilding	May 14, 2006	221	22.60
Part one of a three-part story arc. Gunshot victims from a nearby restaurant crowd Seattle Grace and the doctors are fully occupied. Cristina has an engaged couple who are arguing over him ducking behind her during the shooting, Meredith and Callie's patient could lose his leg, and Derek and George have a 12-week pregnant girl. Knowing that Derek is mad at Meredith for dating Finn, Addison yells at him in the hallways, not realizing everyone can hear. Meredith asks Callie for advice on bone cancer in dogs. Burke is still angry at Cristina and chooses Alex over her to go with him to retrieve a heart for Denny. When Izzie finds out that Denny is about to not get the heart, she takes the matter into her own hands. Callie professes her love to George, but before he can answer her, Izzie asks for his help with Denny, and he goes with her. As Burke races back to SGH to keep Izzie from doing something drastic, both Burke and Denny wind up in critical situations.
35	26	"Deterioration of the Fight or Flight Response"	Rob Corn	Tony Phelan & Joan Rater	May 15, 2006	222	22.50
Part two of a three-part story arc. The interns help Izzie keep Denny alive after she cuts his left ventricular assist device (LVAD) wire. Derek must perform surgery on Burke's shoulder and risk doing irreparable damage to the nerves. Cristina freezes in the OR during Burke's surgery. Webber discovers his niece's cancer has returned. Adele reveals to Webber that she knew about his affair with Ellis Grey. Alex fights for Denny's heart at Mercy West, eventually offering Dr. Hahn the chance to scrub in at the surgery as Burke has been shot. Before surgery, Denny asks Izzie to marry him. However, after the heart has been inserted, it does not beat and back in Derek's OR, Burke still cannot move his fingers.
36	27	"Losing My Religion"	Mark Tinker	Shonda Rhimes	May 15, 2006	223	22.50
Part three of a three-part story arc. The interns are pulled into Dr. Webber's office for interrogation regarding the LVAD wire situation. None of them reveal the truth, protecting Izzie, but Meredith confronts Dr. Webber over his affair with her mother. Dr. Webber tells them all that they are off surgery, and they are to give his niece a prom. Burke finds a tremor in his right hand. Meredith and Derek make the decision to put Doc to sleep. Izzie accepts Denny's marriage proposal. During the prom, Derek and Meredith reunite in an exam room. The interns find Izzie lying in bed clinging to Denny, who has died from a stroke. Izzie leaves Seattle Grace, and on her way out confesses to Dr. Webber that she cut the LVAD wire and that she quits the program. Meredith remains torn on whom she should follow: Derek or Finn.

== Cast and characters ==
=== Main ===
- Ellen Pompeo as Dr. Meredith Grey
- Sandra Oh as Dr. Cristina Yang
- Katherine Heigl as Dr. Izzie Stevens
- Justin Chambers as Dr. Alex Karev
- T. R. Knight as Dr. George O'Malley
- Chandra Wilson as Dr. Miranda Bailey
- James Pickens Jr. as Dr. Richard Webber
- Kate Walsh as Dr. Addison Montgomery-Shepherd
- Isaiah Washington as Dr. Preston Burke
- Patrick Dempsey as Dr. Derek Shepherd

=== Recurring ===
- Sara Ramirez as Dr. Callie Torres
- Brooke Smith as Dr. Erica Hahn
- Kate Burton as Ellis Grey
- Steven W. Bailey as Joe, the Bartender
- Chris O'Donnell as Finn Dandridge
- Loretta Devine as Adele Webber
- Jeffrey Dean Morgan as Denny Duquette

=== Notable guests ===
- Eric Dane as Dr. Mark Sloan
- Sarah Utterback as Olivia Harper
- Kali Rocha as Sydney Heron
- Tsai Chin as Helen Yang
- Jeff Perry as Thatcher Grey
- Mare Winningham as Susan Grey
- Laurie Metcalf as Beatrice Carver
- Jillian Armenante as Mindy Carlson
- Brian Kerwin as Holden McKee
- Jesse Plemons as Jake Burton
- Tessa Thompson as Camille Travis
- Monica Keena as Bonnie Crasnoff
- Kym Whitley as Yvonne
- Katherine LaNasa as Vera Kalpana
- Cress Williams as Tucker Jones
- Anjul Nigam as Dr. Raj Sen
- Robin Pearson Rose as Patricia Murphy
- George Dzundza as Harold O'Malley
- Tim Griffin as Ronny O'Malley
- Greg Pitts as Jerry O'Malley
- Mary Kay Place as Olive Warner
- Christina Ricci as Hannah Davies
- John Cho as Marshall Stone
- Mandy Siegfried as Molly Grey
- Kyle Chandler as Dylan Young

== Production ==
=== Crew ===
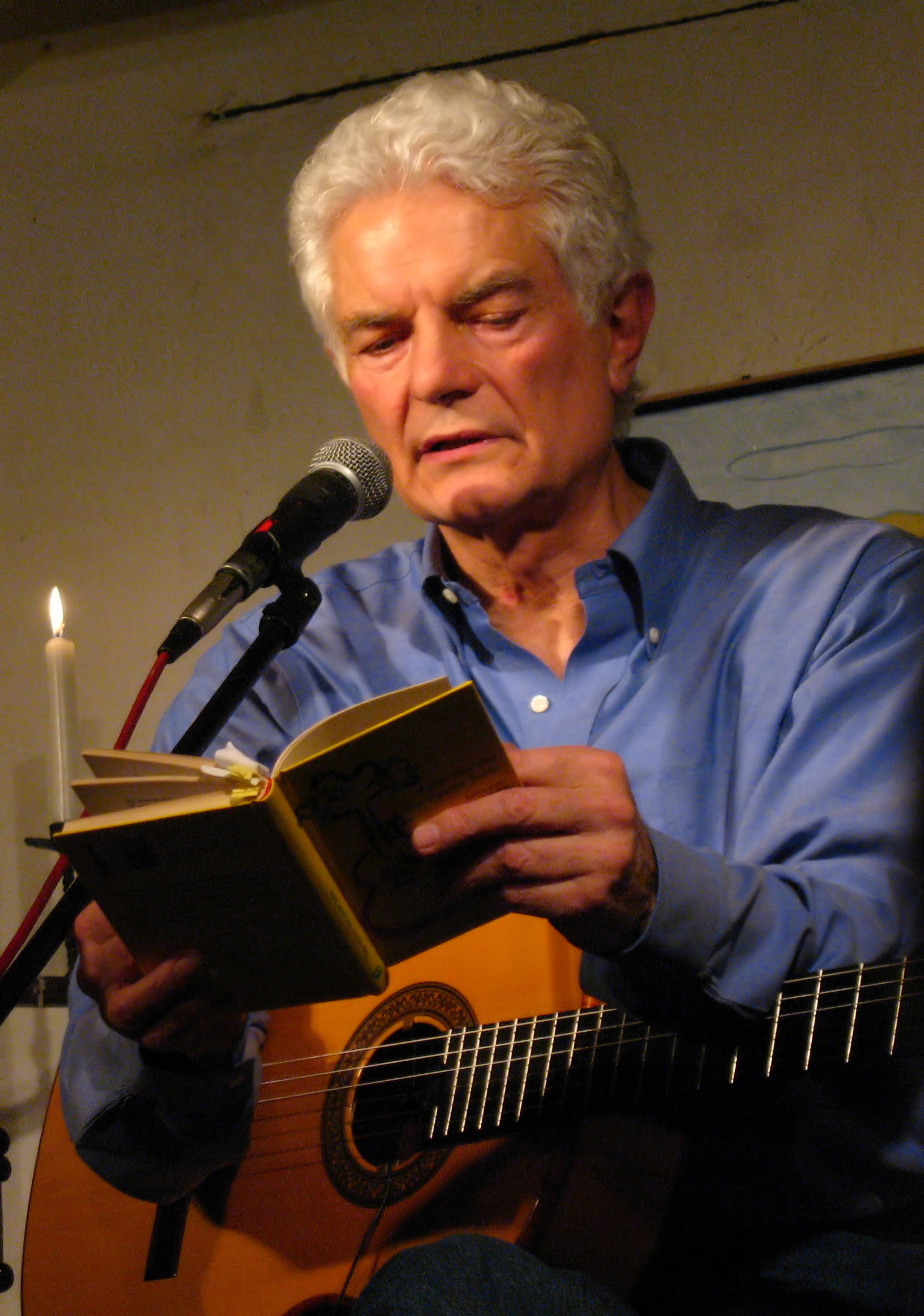
Peter Horton served as both one of the executive producers and also directed 5 episodes.

The season was produced by Touchstone Television in association with ShondaLand Production Company and The Mark Gordon Company. Shonda Rhimes returned as the series' showrunner and executive producer. She also continued her position from the first two seasons as one of the most prominent members of the writing staff. Betsy Beers, Mark Gordon, Mark Wilding, and Rob Corn returned as executive producers, along with James D. Parriott, Peter Horton, and Krista Vernoff, who have been in this position since the inception of the series. Parriott, who also served as an episodic writer, left the series at the conclusion of the season. Joan Rater and Tony Phelan continued to serve as co-executive producers, with Rater being a supervising producer as well. Stacy McKee, who would be promoted to co-executive producer for the third season, returned to the series as a producer and a member of the writing staff. Having written 3 episodes for the first season, Rhimes returned as a writer for 5 episodes. Parriott, Vernoff, Phelan, Rater, Wilding and Mimi Schmir were the most prominent members of the writing staff, with Parriott, Phelan, Rater, Wilding, Clack writing 2 episodes and Schmir producing the script for 3. Gabrielle Stanton and Harry Werksman, Jr. worked together for the writing of 2 episodes, after having written 1 episode for the series in the past.

The season includes the first episode to be written by Zoanne Clack, who would become one of the series' main writers, as well as a co-producer and executive story editor. Other writers include Kip Koenig, Blythe Robe and Elizabeth Klaviter. Executive producer Peter Horton returned to the series to direct 5 episodes for the season, after writing 2 episodes in the second season. Rob Corn directed 2 episodes, whereas Adam Davidson is credited for writing 3 episodes, his last ones in the series. Among the other directors are Wendey Stanzler, Mark Tinker, Jeff Melman, Jessica Yu, Lesli Linka Glatter, Michael Dinner, Dan Minahan, David Paymer, Julie Anne Robinson, Tricia Brock, and Seith Mann. Danny Lux continued his position as the main music composer for the series, while Herbert Davis, Tim Suhrstedt and Adam Kane served as the season's cinematography directors. Susan Vaill and Edward Ornelas resumed their positions as editors, joined by Briana London, who left the series after 9 episodes. Linda Lowy and John Brace, responsible for the casting since the beginning of the series, returned as casting team members. After the departure of Laurence Bennett, the production design team was taken over by Donald Lee Harris, with Amy B. Ancona and Brandee Dell'Aringa joining for 10 episodes each.

=== Writing and filming ===
"The weird thing about working in television is that you only see the people that you’re in scenes with. It’s not like you’re all running around the set together. So if you’re going to hang out together, you kind of have to make an effort. And I think people have families, people have lives."

— Sara Ramirez on her first days at Grey's Anatomy

The season was primarily filmed in Los Angeles, California. Fisher Plaza, which is the headquarters building for the media company Fisher Communications and Fisher's ABC affiliated Komo radio and television stations for Seattle, is used for some exterior shots of Seattle Grace Mercy West Hospital, such as air ambulances landing on the Komo Television newscopter's helipad. This puts Seattle Grace conveniently close to the Space Needle, which is directly across the street from Fisher Plaza, the Seattle Monorail, and other local landmarks. However, the hospital used for most other exterior and many interior shots is not in Seattle, are shot at the VA Sepulveda Ambulatory Care Center in North Hills, California. Most scenes are primarily taped in Los Feliz, Los Angeles, at the Prospect Studios, and the set occupies two stages, including the hospital pieces, but some outside scenes are shot at the Warren G. Magnuson Park in Seattle. Several props used are genuine medical supplies, including the MRI machine.

Prior to being cast, Sara Ramirez was seen by ABC executives, in her Broadway performance of Spamalot, which garnered their attention. Due to their admiration, the network offered Ramirez a role on any ABC television series, of her choice, which ultimately led in her choosing Grey's Anatomy. Ramirez further explained that at her initial audition, the producers liked her, and had intentions to add her to the show, but did not know whom to cast her as. She also said she was in awe of how the executives said, "Pick a show, any show!", a statement she deemed rare. Ramirez's character was given recurring status in the second season, having been conceived as a love-interest for George O'Malley. At Torres' initial appearance on the show, she was disliked by fans, due to her getting in the way of O'Malley and Grey's relationship. When asked of this, Ramirez said: "You do run across a lot of people who are extremely invested in that storyline. Obviously, I've heard some negative stuff."

Discussing Izzie Stevens' relationship with Alex Karev, Katherine Heigl described her character as naive enough to believe she can save him, assessing that: "Even when Alex was a complete dirtbag to her, she forgave him and gave him another chance. And he really screwed her over." Writer Stacy McKee described Izzie's moving on from Alex to patient Denny Duquette as "karma", as Alex previously treated Izzie badly, yet as he begins to realize his true feelings, he is forced to watch her embark on a romance with Denny, regarded by her as "undeniably handsome and totally charming." Series writer Blythe Robe commented on Izzie and Denny: "I love the way Izzie lights up when she’s around him. I love their relationship because it's so pure and honest and completely game-free." Writer Elizabeth Klaviter noted at this time the way Izzie "seems to be sacrificing her reputation because of her feelings for Denny." When Izzie deliberately worsened Denny's condition to move him up the transplant list, series writer Mark Wilding questioned the morality of the actions, asking: "Is Izzie bad for doing it? Is she tremendously irresponsible? She cut the wire for love so does that make her action understandable?" Series creator Shonda Rhimes discussed costuming choices in the scene which saw the interns gather around Denny's deathbed, explaining: "Meredith and Cristina and Alex and George and Callie are all dressed, not for a prom, but for a funeral. Everyone in dark colors, everyone dressed somberly. As if they were in mourning. Only Izzie is in happy pink. Only Izzie looks like she didn't know this was coming."

Peter Horton, expressed that his plan of developing Chandra Wilson's character, Miranda Bailey, was to focus on the similarities between her and the actress, noting that "there's not a mean bone in her body, but she's solid and steady, like a rock." Wilson herself noted a significant evolution in her character's personality, noting a transition from the cold attitude that was characteristic to her in the past, to a maternal outlook on her interns. She also noted a number of similarities between her and her character, describing how she considers Miranda Bailey an alter-ego of hers, rather than someone living inside her. Wilson also assessed that being a real-life human is what makes Bailey an appreciated character: "She gets to be flawed, she gets to be tired, she can be cranky, she can be grumpy." Showrunner Shonda Rhimes explained that the idea of Miranda Bailey having a child was developed after Chandra Wilson had already been pregnant for 6 months. Cast member Kate Walsh deemed Wilson's portrayal of her character "sweet and wonderful", naming her a professional: "She makes you be a better actor, just by being there." She also described her performance during her character's labor as "heart-breaking, tender, powerful and wonderful", noting how she managed to transform the strong character into "a weak woman, struggling to fight the unusual situation." Fellow cast member James Pickens, Jr. described Wilson's portrayal of Miranda Bailey as "a breath of fresh air, literally and figuratively", also noting how the force she delivers is mainly due to the start of her career being in theater.

Horton also described the production process of the "It's the End of the World" and "As We Know It" two-part story arc, which he claimed to have been planning since the beginning of the series. He stated that the plot of the episodes had to "fill the demands of the Super Bowl", which was scheduled to air in the same night: "We really wanted something different and Shonda [Rhimes] came up with the idea of this bomb, that we found simply outstanding!" Visual effects supervisor Scott Milnex noted how "breaking down the story boards was really the key to getting all the departments to work together" during those episodes. He also assessed that the necessity to use Primacord, an element they had been trying to avoid, for the explosion scene proved excessively dangerous, and was ultimately replaced with wood and clothing material. He described the filming process by emphasizing the transition from mannequin to the real actor: "When we filmed it, there was a moment, a fraction of a second, when we changed the body with the actor."

=== Casting ===
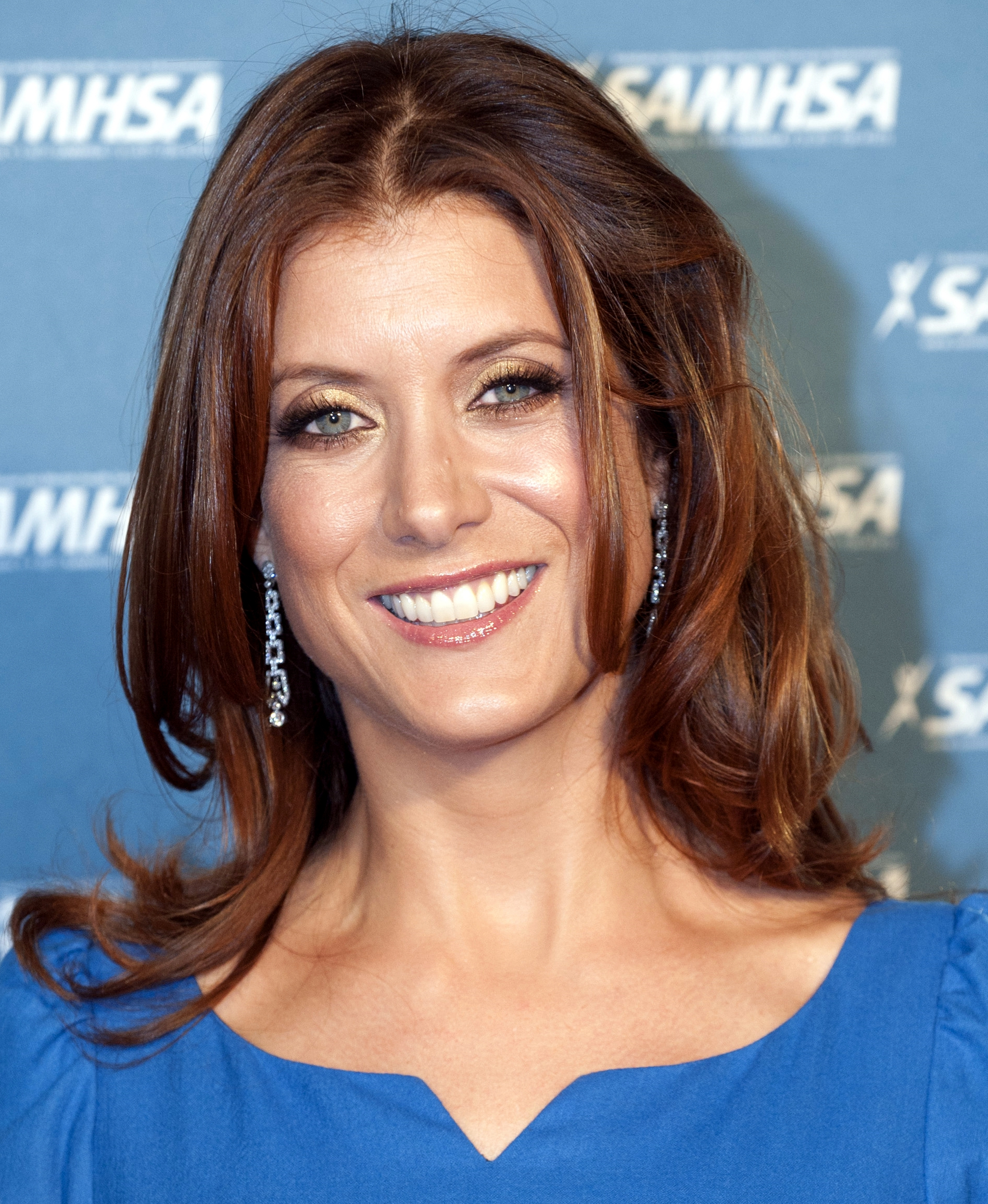
Walsh became a series regular in the seventh episode of the season, after previous appearances in a guest-star capacity.

The second season had ten roles receiving star billing, out of whom nine were returning from the first season. All the actors who appear as series-regulars portray physicians from the fictional Seattle Grace Hospital, specialized in surgery. Ellen Pompeo acted as Meredith Grey, the protagonist and the narrator of the series, a surgical intern who struggles to balance the difficulties of the competitive career she has chosen, with her troubled personal background. Sandra Oh portrayed highly competitive intern Cristina Yang, who suffers a miscarriage before she manages to make a decision about whether or not she wants to terminate the pregnancy. Katherine Heigl played intern Izzie Stevens, in a continuous struggle to be looked upon as a doctor, not the model she used to be. Justin Chambers acted as Alex Karev, who begins to develop an emotional side of his personality, after being introduced as arrogant and selfish. T. R. Knight played the role of intern George O'Malley, whose insecurity and lack of self-confidence evolve due to his unshared feelings for Meredith Grey. Chandra Wilson portrayed surgical resident and brilliant general surgeon Miranda Bailey, the mentor of the five interns, whose rudeness and cold attitude earns her the nickname "The Nazi." James Pickens, Jr. portrayed Seattle Grace Hospital's Chief of Surgery, Richard Webber, whose relationship with Meredith Grey's mother, which occurred 21 years ago, threatens to ruin his marriage. Isaiah Washington played the role of attending physician and cardiothoracic surgeon Preston Burke, who learns that Cristina, with whom he had a sexual relationship, is pregnant with his child. Patrick Dempsey portrayed attending neurosurgeon Derek Shepherd, whose relationship with intern Meredith Grey has been the focal point of the series since its inception. Although originally conceived as a guest-star with a five-episode story arc, Kate Walsh decided to extend her contract following positive reviews from critics and fans, resulting in her getting promoted to series-regular status. Being the first addition to the original cast from the first season, Walsh began receiving star-billing in the seventh episode of the season, portraying obstetrician-gynaecologist and world-class neonatal surgeon Addison Montgomery Shepherd, who comes in Seattle seeking reconciliation with her estranged husband, Derek Shepherd.

Numerous supporting characters have been given expansive and recurring appearances in the progressive storyline. Sara Ramirez appeared in a nine-episode arc in the season, portraying orthopedic surgical resident Callie Torres, introduced and developed as a love-interest for the character of George O'Malley. Steven W. Bailey is introduced in the recurring role of Joe, the Bartender, often being portrayed as a confidant of the surgeons of Seattle Grace Hospital. Chris O'Donnell portrayed veterinary physician Finn Dandridge, who became a love-interest for Meredith Grey. Renowned surgeon Ellis Grey, Meredith's mother, who is suffering from Alzheimer's disease, continues her recurring role from the first season, being portrayed by Kate Burton. Brooke Smith portrayed Erica Hahn, a cardiothoracic surgeon at Seattle Presbyterian Hospital, who is revealed to have been a rival of Preston Burke ever since they attended medical school together. Jeffrey Dean Morgan appears in six episodes throughout the season, portraying patient Denny Duquette, who begins a relationship with Izzie Stevens, but ultimately dies following an unsuccessful heart transplant surgery. Loretta Devine acted as Adele Webber, Richard's wife, who is revealed to have been aware of her husband's affair since its inception. Other guest-stars include Sarah Utterback in the role of nurse Olivia Harper, love-interest of both George O'Malley and Alex Karev, Kali Rocha portraying fifth-year resident Sydney Heron, who replaces Miranda Bailey temporarily when she takes a maternity leave, Jeff Perry portraying Meredith Grey's father, Thatcher Grey, Mare Winningham in the role of Susan Grey, Tsai Chin in the role of Helen Yang Rubenstein, Cristina's mother, Mandy Siegfried portraying Molly Grey Thompson, Meredith's half-sister and Tessa Thompson portraying Camille Travis, Richard Webber's niece, Christina Ricci portraying paramedic Hannah Davies, and Kyle Chandler in the role of Dylan Young, head of the bomb squad. Eric Dane, who would be promoted to a series-regular in the third season, appeared in the eighteenth episode, portraying attending physician, otolaryngologist and plastic surgeon Mark Sloan, Addison Montgomery's former lover, whose affair with her is presented as the reason behind the estrangement of her husband, Derek Shepherd.

== Release ==
The first five episodes of the season were initially planned to be within the first season with the episode "Bring the Pain" as the season one finale. According to Rhimes, after airing the ninth episode of the show, the ratings, the time-slots and the really great audience meant that they had to end the season with that episode, and the cliffhanger with the coming of Derek's estranged wife fit perfectly.

Due to the success of the first season, Grey's Anatomy took over the Sunday night timeslot along with Desperate Housewives, replacing Boston Legal at 10:00 pm. The highly acclaimed sixteenth and seventeenth episodes "It's the End of the World" and "As We Know It" formed the first two-part storyline, while the season finale was conceived as a three-parter, also the first of its kind in the series, and it aired on two consecutive nights with the final two episodes back-to-back.

In addition to the regular episodes, two clip shows recapped previous events of the show, both narrated by Steven W. Bailey in his recently introduced role as Joe the Bartender. The first special "Straight to Heart" aired one week before the winter-holiday hiatus ended, recapping the most memorable events of the first season and the first half of the second. It was followed by "Under Pressure", which aired before the twenty-third episode "Blues for Sister Someone".

Internationally, the season was distributed by Buena Vista International Television.

== Reception ==
=== Ratings ===
The second season averaged 21.07 million viewers, making it the highest-rated season of the series to date. It was ranked number five in the 2005-2006 television season with a 6.9 ratings share in the 18–49 demographic. The season also includes the series' highest-rated episode, "It's the End of the World" which was watched by 37.88 million viewers.

=== Critical response ===
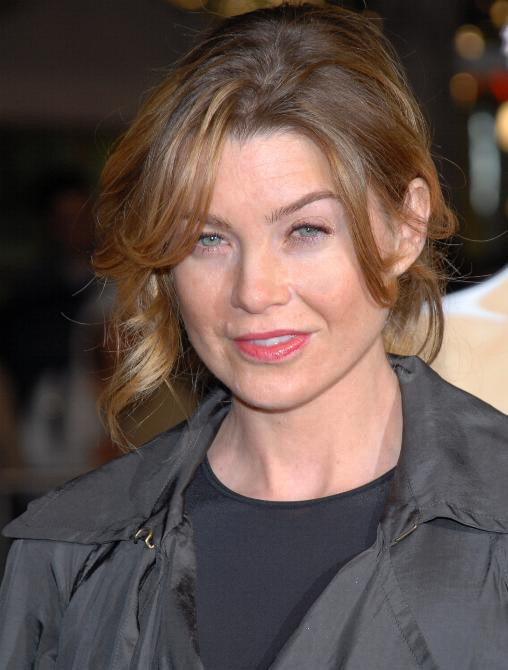
Ellen Pompeo was nominated for Best Actress in a Drama Series at the 63rd Golden Globe Awards.

The season opened up to high critical acclaim with many critics calling it "one of the best shows on TV" and was included in the top 10 for numerous "best of television" lists of 2006. Emily VanDerWerff of The A.V. Club called the show a "Pokémon" and "one of the best TV shows around, burning through plot points at a furious clip, swooning romanticism, at embracing the kind of deeply-earnest, intensely-felt romance that made the show’s relationships so great. Meredith’s famous "Pick Me, Choose Me, Love Me" speech is corny, to be sure, but it's got tremendous rhythm and absolute conviction... season 2 of Grey's was a comet." Todd Gilchrist of IGN Entertainment expressed hope in the further development of the series, noting the complex backgrounds of each character as being the series' focal-point. He noted that the ensemble, composed of "countless comely females and enough strong, competitive males" remains outstanding in primetime, being iconic, due to the vast interpretations regarding the main cast. Whereas Gilchrist acknowledged that the show gives the impression of it being only for women, he stated that he can attest to its universal, equal-opportunity appeal, assessing that the show "explores the medical world with both a sense of testosterone-fueled intensity and estrogen-laced sensitivity" and deserved to have viewers from both genders, championing its merits. In response to the bomb story-arc, he called the 2 episodes "juicy", while assessing that they "followed a storyline that not only explained the series up to that point, but featured all of the characters in their more-or-less purest from." Gilchrist provided an outlook on each character, describing Grey as a "prodigiously talented but insecure surgeon, waylaid by her love for attending Derek Shepherd", while stating that Yang, "an aggressively-ambitious intern" lacks knowledge on any topic, except medicine, comparing her to boyfriend Burke, described as her opposite. In response to George O'Malley's storyline, he noted how his sensitive personality constantly results in difficulty in his path to becoming a proper surgeon. He also expressed excitement in the doors opened by the previous season's cliffhanger, seeing the arrival of Montgomery (Walsh) as "certainly speaking to the show's focus on relationships over the nuts-and-bolts of being a surgeon", while praising Rhimes for continuing to "merge those disparate elements in the way that does, or at least should be a source of enthusiasm for both men and women, creating an atmosphere both professional and intimately personal, often at the same time."

"Overall, the show is terrific. Indeed, one of the best currently on television. While it remains to be seen what the creators do with it, now that it's become an outright event program, the season demonstrates that Rhimes & Co. know what to do with the opportunities presented them. But that just leaves the larger question: do you know what to do with the opportunities presented to you? Because whether you're male or female, this is the kind of entertainment that small-screen devotees and folks fed up with television need to see."

— Todd Gilchrist of IGN Entertainment

Noting the realism in the writing for the series, Gilchrist stated: "It's as if Rhimes & Co. harnessed the sublime and the mundane of our daily experiences, that strange sense of drama that emerges from even the most unimportant daily conflicts, and it transported it on a world that is legitimately fraught with life-and-death decisions." However, he expressed disappointment in the end of the second season, which he deemed surprisingly less strong, compared to the "powerful" first-half and the "immaculate" first season, describing Stevens' "awkward and self-destructive" relationship with a patient as a way to "slow episodes to a screeching halt with maudlin and painfully-underdeveloped turns towards melodrama", while expressing the predictability of Duquette's death. Gilchrist stated in response to Stevens' development in the last part of the second season: "Izzie's descent into abject hysteria, which followed her season-long sanctimoniousness about everything, actually made me want something terrible to happen to her too." He described how some episodes were not among the show's strongest, noting that the some plot-lines created poignancy, and connected in an unfamiliar way.

The reviews have stood the test of time and the season still remains a huge critical favorite. Entertainment Weekly reviewing the tenth season of the show acknowledged that, "the second season is still the show’s best season to date." The site added, "I do want to talk about what season 10 could learn from what I believe is the show’s best season to date: season 2." calling in all the signature elements of the show that it did the best with listing all the best moments from the season, "the elevator", "the walkway", "Joe’s bar, " Meredith's "Pick Me" speech." and the "memorable patients" adding, " I want 2 people stuck on a pole ("Into You Like a Train") or 2 Amish best friends having to say goodbye, and I want those stories to be given ample time to resonate. More than anything, I want them to affect our doctors in heartbreaking and beautiful ways."

Eyder Peralta of The Houston Chronicle was critical of Izzie's ethics in cutting Denny's LVAD wire, writing that she "should not be practising medicine" and stating: "That's the reason I don't watch Grey's Anatomy, anymore, because the super-hot blond chick can make an earth-shattering, fatal decision and she doesn't get canned." Regarding the second season, Kevin Carr from 7M Pictures said "Rhimes really just put Scrubs, E.R., Sex and the City and even a dash of The Love Boat in a blender and poured out Grey's Anatomy." Also in regard to the second season, Christopher Monfette of IGN TV said "[...] The second season of this medical drama expertly wove its signature elements of complex relationships, whimsical banter and challenging life-lessons - all to a montage-fetish, indie-rock soundtrack."

=== Accolades ===
In 2006, the series won the Golden Globe for Best Drama Series. Sandra Oh won the 2005 Golden Globe for Best Supporting Actress in a Series, Miniseries, or TV Film and the 2006 Screen Actors Guild Award for Outstanding Performance by a Female Actor in a Drama Series for her portrayal of Cristina Yang in the show's second season. Ellen Pompeo and Patrick Dempsey were also nominated for the Best Actress in a Drama Series and Best Actor in a Drama Series respectively at the 63rd Golden Globe Awards.

In 2006, casting directors Linda Lowy and John Brace won the Primetime Emmy Award Outstanding Casting for a Drama Series. The Grey's Anatomy cast won Best Ensemble in a Television Series at the 2006 Satellite Awards. At the Screen Actors Guild Awards, the cast was nominated for Outstanding Performance by an Ensemble in a Drama Series. Isaiah Washington was awarded Outstanding Actor in a Drama Series at the NAACP Image Awards in 2006.

Krista Vernoff received a Primetime Emmy Award for Outstanding Writing for a Drama Series nomination for the sixth episode of the season, which also earned Jeff Melman a nomination for Best Directing – Drama Series, Night at the 58th Directors Guild of America Awards. The sixteenth and seventeenth episodes of the season secured showrunner Shonda Rhimes a nomination for the Primetime Emmy Award for Outstanding Writing for a Drama Series in 2006.

Guest stars Christina Ricci and Kyle Chandler were nominated for Outstanding Guest Actor in a Drama Series and Outstanding Guest Actress in a Drama Series at the 58th Primetime Emmy Awards for their acclaimed portrayals of Hannah Davies, a paramedic, and Dylan Young, a bomb squad technician, respectively. Kate Burton also secured an Emmy nomination for her portrayal of Ellis Grey, Meredith Grey's mother who suffers from Alzheimer's disease.

== DVD release ==
The second season was officially released on DVD in Region 1 on September 12, 2006, almost 2 weeks before the third season premiere which aired on September 21, 2006. Under the title Grey's Anatomy: The Complete Second Season – Uncut, the box-set consists of episodes with Dolby Digital 5.1 surround sound and widescreen format. It also contained extras available only on DVD, including extended episodes, interviews with cast and crew members, footage from behind-the-scenes and unaired scenes cut from the aired episodes. For Target Stores in the United States, the season was released with a bonus disc attached that included a special interview with the cast and crew at the PaleyFest 2006 and some extra deleted scenes. The same set was released in Region 4 on January 10, 2007, 4 months after its original release in the United States, whereas its first release date in Region 2 was May 28, 2007, being made available first in the United Kingdom. The UK set contained the last 22 episodes of the season, due to the first 5 being released on the first season DVD.

Grey's Anatomy: The Complete Second Season - Uncut
Set details		Special features
27 episodes (4 extended); 6-disc set; 1.78:1 aspect ratio; English (Dolby Digital 5.1 Surround); Subtitles: English SDH; Runtime: 1174 minutes		Four Extended Episodes – Expanded and Uncut: "Thanks for the Memories"; "It's the End of the World"; "What Have I Done to Deserve This?"; "Losing My Religion"; Audio Commentaries on 5 episodes: “Into You Like a Train” with director Jeff Melman and writer Krista Vernoff.; “Thanks for the Memories” with creator Shonda Rhimes and editor Susan Vaill.; “Grandma Got Runover by a Reindeer” with Sandra Oh and director Peter Horton.; “It's the End of the World” and “As We Know It” with Shonda Rhimes, director Peter Horton and editor Edward Ornelas.; The Softer Side of Dr. Bailey – Up-Close Interview with Chandra Wilson; The Doctors Are In – Stars Answer Fans' Most Burning Questions; Deleted Scenes; Exclusive Set Tour of Seattle Grace Hospital with James Pickens Jr.; Creating "Pink Mist" – Anatomy of a Special Effect; Grey's Anatomy on Jimmy Kimmel Live!; Exclusive Target Bonus Disc Features: Behind the Scenes Q&A with the cast and crew at the 2006 PaleyFest; Bonus Deleted Scenes
Release dates
Region 1	Region 2	Region 4
September 12, 2006	May 28, 2007	January 10, 2007
