= List of awards and nominations received by The O.C. =

The O.C. awards and nominations
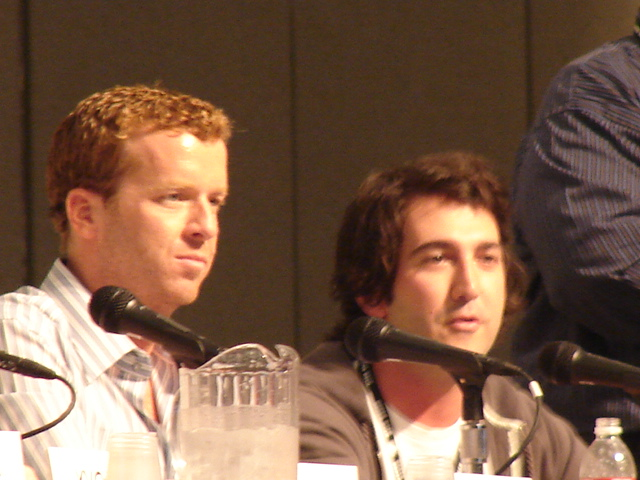
- Executive producer McG and series creator Josh Schwartz
Awards and nominations
Award	Wins	Nominations
Artios Awards	0	1
Logie Awards	1	1
People's Choice Awards	0	1
PRISM Awards	1	7
Teen Choice Awards	12	23
TCA Awards	0	1
WGA Awards	0	1
Young Artist Awards	0	1

Totals (Note: Certain award groups do not simply award one winner. They acknowledge several different recipients, have runners-up, and have third place. Since this is a specific recognition and is different from losing an award, runner-up mentions are considered wins in this award tally. For simplification and to avoid errors, each award in this list has been presumed to have had a prior nomination.)
- Wins: 14
- Nominations: 36

The following is a list of awards and nominations received by The O.C., an American teen drama television series.

== Artios Awards ==
The Artios Awards have been presented since 1985 for excellence in casting. Hosted by the Casting Society of America, theatrical casting in over eighteen categories is honored. The O.C. has received one nomination.

Year	Category	Nominee	Result
2004	Dramatic Pilot	Patrick J. Rush & Alyson Silverberg (for "Premiere")	Nominated

== Logie Awards ==
The Logie Awards have been awarded since 1959. Hosted by TV Week, the Australian television industry honor excellence in Australian television. The O.C. has received one award.

Year	Category	Result
2005	Most Popular Overseas Program	Won

== People's Choice Awards ==
The People's Choice Awards have been held annually since 1975. Hosted by Procter & Gamble they claim to honor shows based on the opinions of the general public. The O.C. has received one nomination.

Year	Category	Result
2005	Favorite TV Dramatic Series	Nominated

== PRISM Awards ==
The PRISM Awards are awarded annually to shows making realistic depictions of dependence. Hosted by the Entertainment Industries Council it honors programs that have dealt with drug, alcohol and tobacco issues well. The O.C. has received one award from seven nominations.

Year	Category	Nominee	Result
2004	TV Drama Series Episode	"The Gamble"	Commended
2004	TV Drama Series Multi-Episode Storyline	"The Escape"	Commended
2005	TV Drama Series Episode	"The Proposal"	Nominated
2005	Performance in a TV Drama Series Episode	Mischa Barton	Nominated
2006	TV Drama Series Episode	"The Dearly Beloved"	Nominated
2006	Performance in a TV Drama Series Episode	Peter Gallagher	Nominated
2006	Performance in a TV Drama Series Episode	Kelly Rowan	Won

== Teen Choice Awards ==
The Teen Choice Awards are presented annually by the Fox Broadcasting Company and Global Television Network. The program honors the year's biggest achievements in music, movies, sports, and television, as voted by teenagers aged twelve to nineteen. The O.C. has received twelve awards from twenty-three nominations.

Year	Category	Nominee	Result
2004	Choice Breakout TV Show		Won
2004	Choice Breakout TV Star – Female	Mischa Barton	Won
2004	Choice Breakout TV Star – Female	Rachel Bilson	Nominated
2004	Choice Breakout TV Star – Male	Adam Brody	Nominated
2004	Choice Breakout TV Star – Male	Benjamin McKenzie	Nominated
2004	Choice TV Actor – Drama/Action Adventure	Adam Brody	Won
2004	Choice TV Actor – Drama/Action Adventure	Benjamin McKenzie	Nominated
2004	Choice TV Actress – Drama/Action Adventure	Mischa Barton	Nominated
2004	Choice TV Actress – Drama/Action Adventure	Rachel Bilson	Nominated
2004	Choice TV Show – Drama/Action Adventure		Won
2005	Choice TV Actor: Drama	Adam Brody	Won
2005	Choice TV Actor: Drama	Benjamin McKenzie	Nominated
2005	Choice TV Actress: Drama	Mischa Barton	Nominated
2005	Choice TV Actress: Drama	Rachel Bilson	Won
2005	Choice TV Chemistry	Mischa Barton & Benjamin McKenzie	Nominated
2005	Choice TV Chemistry	Rachel Bilson & Adam Brody	Won
2005	Choice TV Parental Units	Kelly Rowan & Peter Gallagher	Nominated
2005	Choice TV Show: Drama		Won
2006	TV – Choice Actor: Drama/Action Adventure	Adam Brody	Won
2006	TV – Choice Actress	Mischa Barton	Won
2006	TV – Choice Actress: Drama/Action Adventure	Rachel Bilson	Won
2006	TV – Choice Drama/Action Adventure Show		Won
2006	TV – Choice Parental Unit	Kelly Rowan & Peter Gallagher	Nominated

== TCA Awards ==
The Television Critics Association (or TCA) is a group of approximately 200 United States and Canadian journalists and columnists who cover television programming. Since 1984 the organization has hosted the TCA Awards, honoring television excellence in 11 categories, which are presented every summer. The O.C. has received one nomination.

Year	Category	Result
2004	Outstanding New Program	Nominated

== WGA Awards ==
The Writers Guild of America Awards are presented annually by the Writers Guild of America. The O.C. has received one nomination.

Year	Category	Nominee(s)	Episode	Result
2004	Episodic Drama	Josh Schwartz	"Premiere"	Nominated

== Young Artist Awards ==
Beginning in 1981, the Young Artist Awards have been presented yearly in Los Angeles by the Young Artist Foundation. The O.C. has received one nomination.

Year	Category	Nominee	Result
2008	Best Performance in a TV Series – Guest Starring Young Actress	Bella Thorne (in The Case of the Franks)	Nominated
