= 58th Writers Guild of America Awards =

58th WGA Awards
- Date: February 4, 2006
- Organized by: Writers Guild of America, East and the Writers Guild of America, West

Highlights
- Best Adapted Screenplay: Brokeback Mountain

The 58th Writers Guild of America Awards, given on February 4, 2006, honored the best film and television writers of 2005.

== Winners and nominees ==
=== Film ===
==== Adapted Screenplay ====
Brokeback Mountain – Larry McMurtry and Diana Ossana †

- Capote – Dan Futterman
- The Constant Gardener – Jeffrey Caine
- A History of Violence – Josh Olson
- Syriana – Stephen Gaghan

==== Original Screenplay ====
Crash – Paul Haggis and Bobby Moresco †

- The 40-Year-Old Virgin – Judd Apatow and Steve Carell
- Cinderella Man – Akiva Goldsman and Cliff Hollingsworth
- Good Night, and Good Luck. – George Clooney and Grant Heslov
- The Squid and the Whale – Noah Baumbach

==== Documentary Screenplay ====
Enron: The Smartest Guys in the Room – Alex Gibney; based on the book The Smartest Guys in the Room: The Amazing Rise and Scandalous Fall of Enron by Bethany McLean and Peter Elkind

- Cowboy del Amor – Michèle Ohayon
- The Fall of Fujimori – Ellen Perry, Zack Anderson, and Kim Roberts
- March of the Penguins – Luc Jacquet and Michel Fessler (narration written by Jordan Roberts); based on the story by Luc Jacquet
- Street Fight – Marshall Curry

=== Television ===
==== Dramatic Series ====
Lost – J. J. Abrams, Kim Clements, Carlton Cuse, Leonard Dick, Paul Dini, Brent Fletcher, David Fury, Drew Goddard, Javier Grillo-Marxuach, Adam Horowitz, Jennifer Johnson, Christina M. Kim, Edward Kitsis, Jeffrey Lieber, Damon Lindelof, Lynne E. Litt, Monica Macer, Steven Maeda, Elizabeth Sarnoff, Janet Tamaro, Christian Taylor, Craig Wright

- Deadwood – Regina Corrado, Sara Hess, Ted Mann, Bryan McDonald, Bernadette McNamara, David Milch, Peter Ocko, Elizabeth Sarnoff, Steve Shill, Nick Towne, Jody Worth
- Grey's Anatomy – Zoanne Clack, Ann Hamilton, Kip Koenig, Stacy McKee, James D. Parriott, Tony Phelan, Joan Rater, Shonda Rhimes, Mimi Schmir, Gabrielle Stanton, Krista Vernoff, Harry Werksman
- Six Feet Under – Alan Ball, Scott Buck, Rick Cleveland, Bruce Eric Kaplan, Nancy Oliver, Kate Robin, Joey Soloway, Craig Wright
- The West Wing – Eli Attie, Debora Cahn, Carol Flint, Mark Goffman, Alex Graves, Peter Noah, Lawrence O'Donnell, Lauren Schmidt, Josh Singer, Aaron Sorkin, John Wells, Bradley Whitford, John Sacret Young

==== Comedy Series ====
Curb Your Enthusiasm – Larry David

- Arrested Development – Barbara Feldman, Brad Copeland, Richard Day, Karey Dornetto, Jake Farrow, Abraham Higginbotham, Mitchell Hurwitz, Sam Laybourne, John Levenstein, Courtney Lilly, Dean Lorey, Chuck Martin, Lisa Parsons, Richard Rosenstock, Tom Saunders, Maria Semple, Chuck Tatham, Jim Vallely, Ron Weiner
- Entourage – Brian Burns, Larry Charles, Cliff Dorfman, Doug Ellin, Chris Henchy, Stephen Levinson, Rob Weiss
- My Name Is Earl – Barbara Feldman, Bobby Bowman, Vali Chandrasekaran, J.B. Cook, Brad Copeland, Victor Fresco, Gregory Thomas Garcia, John Hoberg, Kat Likkel, Michael Pennie, Timothy Stack, Hilary Winston, Danielle Sanchez
- The Office – Jennifer Celotta, Greg Daniels, Lee Eisenberg, Ricky Gervais, Mindy Kaling, Paul Lieberstein, Stephen Merchant, B. J. Novak, Michael Schur, Gene Stupnitsky, Larry Wilmore

==== New Series ====
Grey's Anatomy – Zoanne Clack, Ann Lewis Hamilton, Kip Koenig, Stacy McKee, James D. Parriott, Tony Phelan, Joan Rater, Shonda Rhimes, Mimi Schmir, Gabrielle G. Stanton, Krista Vernoff, Harry Werksman and Mark Wilding

- Everybody Hates Chris – Aron Abrams, Rodney Barnes, Craig DiGregorio, Alyson Fouse, Howard Gewirtz, Ali LeRoi, Courtney Lilly, Chris Rock, Gregory Thompson and Kriss Turner
- My Name Is Earl – Barbara Feldman, Bobby Bowman, Vali Chandrasekaran, J.B. Cook, Brad Copeland, Victor Fresco, Gregory Thomas Garcia, John Hoberg, Kat Likkel, Michael Pennie, Timothy Stack, Hilary Winston and Danielle Sanchez
- The Office – Jennifer Celotta, Greg Daniels, Lee Eisenberg, Ricky Gervais, Mindy Kaling, Paul Lieberstein, Stephen Merchant, B. J. Novak, Michael Schur, Gene Stupnitsky and Larry Wilmore
- Rome – Alexandra Cunningham, David Frankel, Bruno Heller, Adrian Hodges, William J. MacDonald and John Milius

==== Episodic Drama ====
"Autopsy" – House – Lawrence Kaplow

- "Grave Danger" – CSI: Crime Scene Investigation – Anthony E. Zuiker, Carol Mendelsohn, Naren Shankar (teleplay); Quentin Tarantino (story)
- "Rhea Reynolds" – Nip/Tuck – Jennifer Salt
- "Singing for Our Lives" – Six Feet Under – Scott Buck
- "Normal Is the Watchword" – Veronica Mars – Rob Thomas
- "A Good Day" – The West Wing – Carol Flint

==== Episodic Comedy ====
"You Can't Miss the Bear (Pilot)" – Weeds – Jenji Kohan

- "Diversity Day" – The Office – B. J. Novak
- "Exile on Main Street (Pilot)" – Kitchen Confidential – David Hemingson
- "Motivational Seminar" – Malcolm in the Middle – Rob Ulin
- "Next" – Desperate Housewives – Jenna Bans & Kevin Murphy
- "Pilot" – My Name Is Earl – Greg Garcia

==== Long Form – Adapted ====
The Life and Death of Peter Sellers – Christopher Markus and Stephen McFeely

- The Colt – Stephen Harrigan
- Lackawanna Blues – Ruben Santiago-Hudson
- Our Fathers – Thomas Michael Donnelly

==== Long Form – Original ====
Warm Springs – Margaret Nagle

- Dirt – Richard Guay and Nancy Savoca
- The Librarian: Quest for the Spear – David N. Titcher
- The Reading Room – Randy Feldman

==== Daytime Serials ====
The Young and the Restless – Kay Alden, John F. Smith, Trent Jones, Jim Houghton, Sandra Weintraub, Chris Abbott, Joshua S. McCaffrey, Sara A. Bibel, Janice Ferri Esser, Natalie Minardi Slater, Eric Freiwald, Sally Sussman Morina
