= Theo Avgerinos =

American film director (born 1978)

Theo Avgerinos (born September 22, 1978, in New York City) is an American film director.

His directoral debut was Fifty Pills, an independent film. Budgeted at $250,000, it featured Lou Taylor Pucci, Kristen Bell, John Hensley, Nora Zehetner, Michael Peña, Jane Lynch, Monica Keena and Eddie Kaye Thomas. Despite a generally positive review from Screen International, it received a 33% on Rotten Tomatoes.

He also directed the 2015 film Americons. In 2024, his documentary Rising Hope was presented at the LightReel Film Festival, winning Best Documentary Feature.
