= How to Make the Cruelest Month =

- Directed by: Kip Koenig
- Written by: Kip Koenig
- Produced by: Alison Dickey; Mark Lipson
- Starring: Clea DuVall; Gabriel Mann; Marianne Jean-Baptiste; Mary Kay Place; Dennis Haysbert
- Cinematography: Julian Whatley
- Edited by: Chris Figler
- Music by: Jeff Martin
- Release date: January 16, 1998 (Sundance)
- Running time: 99 minutes
- Country: United States
- Language: English

How to Make the Cruelest Month is a 1998 comedy film written and directed by Kip Koenig and starring Clea DuVall. The story centers on Bell, a young woman who resolves to accomplish her New Year’s resolutions—to quit smoking and to find love—before the end of December.

== Plot ==
Bell is a neurotic young woman living in a small college town who addresses the camera to explain her problems—her parents are splitting up, older sister Sarah is happily married with a baby on the way, and her younger sister Dot is involved with Bell's ex-boyfriend, Leonard. Noting that people rarely stick to their New Year's resolutions, Bell decides she wants to accomplish the goals of quitting smoking and finding love before the year's end.

One night, Bell lures Leonard to a remote area, and in the middle of sex with him, she abandons him, leaving him without his clothes. Trying to find his way back home, Leonard stumbles into the home of eccentric married couple, Manhattan and Christina.

As Bell realizes that she is actually "smoking more and falling in love less", she starts to wonder if she might be a lesbian and tries going on a date with a woman.

== Cast ==
- Clea DuVall as Bell Bryant
- Gabriel Mann as Leonard Crane
- JD Souther as Uncle Jerry
- Mary Kay Place as Mary Bryant
- Marianne Jean-Baptiste as Christina Parks
- Dennis Haysbert as Manhattan Parks
- John Voskamp as Fryer Crane
- Amy Smart as Dot Bryant
- James Duval as Westy
- Jorja Fox as Sarah Bryant
- Christopher Gartin as Dr. Rutledge
- Fred Weller as Rickey

== Release ==
How to Make the Cruelest Month premiered at the 1998 Sundance Film Festival, where it was nominated for the Grand Jury Prize. At the 1998 Long Island Film Festival, the film won the award for Best of the Fest. The film was never distributed outside of festivals. A copy of it is held in the UCLA Film and Television Archive.

=== Critical reception ===
Writing for Variety, Emanuel Levy gave the film a mixed review. He praised the director's ideas and characters, as well as his sensitivity to the issues faced by young Americans. Levy drew comparisons between the film and Woody Allen's early films ("in spirit and ambition, if not in execution"). He also praised the ensemble cast and enjoyed DuVall's performance as the "tomboyish, neurotic Bell", although he noted the latter was "occasionally too intensely mannered." Among Levy's criticisms of the film were its "messy structure and lack of discipline", which he said often characterizes filmmakers' debut features.
