= As We Know It =

- Grey's Anatomy episode
- Episode no.: Season 2 Episode 17
- Directed by: Peter Horton
- Written by: Shonda Rhimes
- Production code: 212
- Original air date: February 12, 2006

Guest appearances
- Christina Ricci as Hannah Davies; Kyle Chandler as Dylan Young; Loretta Devine as Adele Webber; Jillian Armenante as Mindy Carlson; Cress Williams as Tucker Jones

Episode chronology
← Previous "It's the End of the World"	Next → "Yesterday"
- Grey's Anatomy season 2

"As We Know It" is the 17th episode of the second season of the American television medical drama Grey's Anatomy and the show's 26th episode overall. Written by series creator Shonda Rhimes and directed by co-executive producer Peter Horton, it originally aired on February 12, 2006, and is the second of a two-part story, following the first part, "It's the End of the World". Both episodes were named after the R.E.M. song "It's the End of the World as We Know It (And I Feel Fine)".

On its original broadcast, it was watched by 25.42 million viewers, with both parts receiving positive reviews from television critics upon broadcast and its bomb storyline leaving a lasting impression on pop culture.

The episode, along with its first part, earned Rhimes a nomination for the Primetime Emmy Award for Outstanding Writing for a Drama Series. Guest stars Christina Ricci and Kyle Chandler were both Emmy nominated for their performances in the categories Outstanding Guest Actress in a Drama Series and Outstanding Guest Actor in a Drama Series respectively.

== Plot ==
The episode opens with a voice-over narration from Meredith Grey about the inevitability of death and the urgency of making the most of the time one has left.

Miranda Bailey is in labor, but without her husband, Tucker Jones (who is undergoing neurosurgery), by her side, she refuses to push. George O'Malley teams up with obstetrician Addison Montgomery to convince Bailey to have the baby. George finally manages to give Bailey the motivation she needs, ultimately holding her while she delivers the baby. Meanwhile, Izzie Stevens and Alex Karev continue their physical relationship, having sex again.

The hospital's Chief, Richard Webber, is under immense stress from the ongoing chaos, leading everyone to believe he is suffering a heart attack. This concern brings his wife, Adele, to the hospital. During this time, Tucker goes into cardiac arrest but is saved by Derek Shepherd in surgery.

Meredith finally removes the explosive from the patient, and Dylan Young, the leader of the bomb squad, takes it away. As Meredith steps out of the operating room, she watches Dylan carry the bomb down the hallway. Suddenly, the bomb explodes, killing Dylan and a second bomb squad member, and knocking Meredith unconscious.

In a revival of the "shower scene" from the first part of the episode, this time with a more serious tone, a fully clothed Izzie and Cristina Yang wash the blood off a stunned Meredith, while George looks on. Despite the catastrophic events, both Tucker and the man who had the explosive embedded in his body survive.

At the episode's conclusion, Preston Burke and Derek overcome their earlier rivalry and become friends, addressing each other by their first names. In a quiet moment, Cristina tells a sleeping Burke, "I love you, too," reciprocating his confession from that morning. A dazed Derek later visits Meredith, commenting, "You almost died today." When Meredith admits she cannot remember their last kiss, Derek recalls it for her, saying she "smelled like some kind of flower". Meredith identifies the scent as lavender, and Derek leaves the room with a smile after their bittersweet exchange.

== Music ==
The episode's title refers to the song "It's the End of the World as We Know It (And I Feel Fine)" by R.E.M.

Anna Nalick's "Breathe (2 AM)" features in this episode for the first time. Considered an iconic song associated with Grey's Anatomy, it was later reprised by Chyler Leigh as Lexie Grey in the show's musical episode.

== Reception ==
Dave Anderson of TV Guide praised the use of Anna Nalick's song in three pivotal scenes, particularly highlighting the moment where George O'Malley convinces Dr. Miranda Bailey to go through with the birth, calling it T. R. Knight's "turn for Emmy consideration".

In December 2011, Wetpaint named this episode, along with its first part "It's the End of the World", as one of the five best episodes of Grey's Anatomy. Variety also listed the episode in its Top 10 Most Bizarre Medical Maladies encountered in the series.
