= It's the End of the World =

- Grey's Anatomy episode
- Episode no.: Season 2 Episode 16
- Directed by: Peter Horton
- Written by: Shonda Rhimes
- Production code: 211
- Original air date: February 5, 2006 (ABC)
- Running time: 43 minutes

Guest appearances
- Christina Ricci as Hannah Davies; Kyle Chandler as Dylan Young; Jillian Armenante as Mindy Carlson; Cress Williams as Tucker Jones; Larry Clarke as Paul; Sarah Utterback as Nurse Olivia Harper

Episode chronology
← Previous "Break on Through"	Next → "As We Know It"
- Grey's Anatomy season 2

"It's the End of the World" is the 16th episode of the second season of the American television medical drama Grey's Anatomy and the show's 25th episode overall. Written by series creator Shonda Rhimes and directed by co-executive producer Peter Horton, the episode is the first of a two-part storyline, which concludes with the following episode, "As We Know It". Both episodes were named after the R.E.M. song "It's the End of the World as We Know It (And I Feel Fine)".

"It's the End of the World" originally aired on February 5, 2006, on ABC, serving as the lead-out program for Super Bowl XL. On its original broadcast, it was watched by 38.1 million viewers, making it the highest-rated and most-watched episode in the series' history. Both parts received positive reviews from television critics upon broadcast, with its bomb storyline leaving a lasting impression on pop culture.

The episode, along with its second part, earned Rhimes a nomination for the Primetime Emmy Award for Outstanding Writing for a Drama Series. Guest stars Christina Ricci and Kyle Chandler were both Emmy nominated for their performances in the categories Outstanding Guest Actress in a Drama Series and Outstanding Guest Actor in a Drama Series respectively.

== Plot ==
The episode opens with a voice-over narration from Meredith Grey about the inevitability of death and the importance of pursuing one's dreams before it is too late.

In a dream sequence, George O'Malley imagines himself in the shower with Izzie Stevens, Cristina Yang and Meredith Grey. George wakes up from the dream only to find Meredith refusing to get out of bed for work, convinced she will die that day. Despite George and Izzie’s efforts to convince her otherwise, it takes Cristina joining in to finally get Meredith out of bed and to the hospital.

At the hospital, Meredith's ominous premonition seems to gain credibility. Dr. Miranda Bailey returns to the hospital to have her baby, alone, as her husband is on his way by car. Simultaneously, a severely injured male trauma patient and his panicked, screaming wife are brought in by paramedics. One of the paramedics, Hannah Davies, has her hand inside the man's chest cavity to stop the bleeding. Dr. Preston Burke quickly takes charge of the case, and Alex Karev is assigned to calm down the hysterical wife, which he successfully does by yelling back at her, shocking her into composure.

Things take a dangerous turn when it is discovered that Hannah’s hand isn’t the only thing inside the patient's chest. The patient has a piece of unexploded ammunition lodged in him, having accidentally fired a homemade bazooka. The hospital goes into Code Black for a bomb threat, shutting down most of the surgical wing—except for the operation that is already in progress: Derek Shepherd and Cristina are operating on the brain of a man who, unbeknownst to them at first, is Tucker Jones, Bailey's husband, who was involved in a car accident while rushing to the hospital to be with her.

Bailey refuses to have her baby until her husband arrives, unaware that he is already in surgery. The interns discover this when George calls Bailey's husband’s phone at her request, and Izzie finds the phone in the man's belongings. They decide not to tell Bailey until Derek has more information about his prognosis.

Meanwhile, the bomb squad, led by Dylan Young, arrives and works to contain the situation. They want to clear out the ORs of any non-essential personnel, but Derek, Cristina, and Meredith refuse to leave. Elsewhere, Izzie and George talk about feeling like "watchers" compared to Cristina and Meredith, who are "doers". Izzie, determined to act, decides to reignite her relationship with Alex, and they hook up in the supply closet.

Richard Webber, struggling to maintain order amidst the chaos, does his best to keep the hospital functioning despite the escalating danger. In the surgical wing, the anesthesiologist, without warning, quietly trains Hannah on how to provide airflow for the patient and then flees, leaving her alone with the patient and the bomb. Meredith finds Hannah on the verge of a breakdown, about to pull her hand out, which would detonate the bomb and kill everyone in the room. Despite Meredith’s attempts to calm her down, Hannah panics and pulls her hand out, fleeing the scene—leaving Meredith to step in and place her own hand on the bomb to keep the patient and everyone else safe.

== Music ==
The episode's title refers to the song "It's the End of the World as We Know It (And I Feel Fine)" by R.E.M., whose lead singer, Michael Stipe, collaborated with Coldplay frontman Chris Martin for a cover of the Joseph Arthur song "In The Sun", which closes the episode.

== Reception ==
Wetpaint named it in December 2011 one of the 5 best episodes of Grey's Anatomy along with the second part "As We Know It".
