= Monica Keena =

American actress (born 1979)

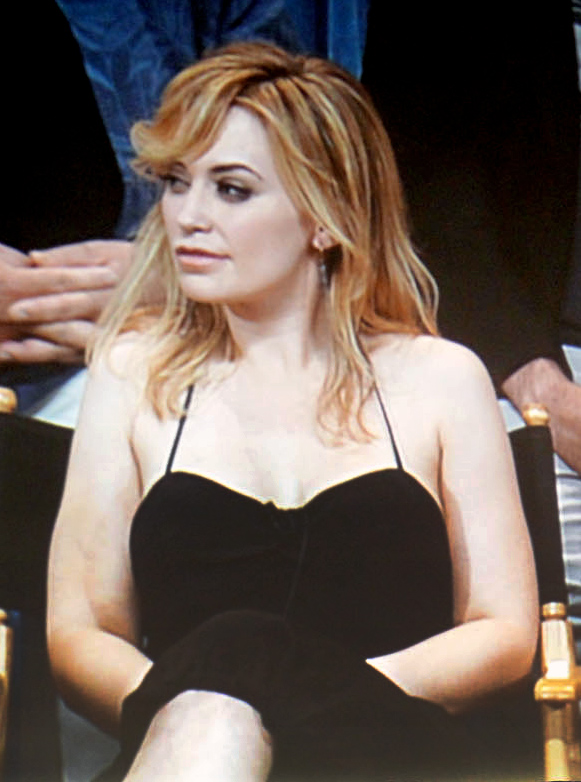
- Keena in 2011
- Born: May 28, 1979 (age 47); New York City, New York, U.S.
- Occupation: Actress
- Years active: 1994–present
- Partner: Edward Furlong (2009–2013)

Monica Keena (born May 28, 1979) is an American actress. Following her feature film debut in While You Were Sleeping (1995), she went on to play leading roles in Snow White: A Tale of Terror (1997), Crime and Punishment in Suburbia (2000), Freddy vs. Jason (2003), and the 2009 remake of Night of the Demons. Her other credits include The Devil's Advocate (1997), Orange County (2002), and Man of the House (2005). On television, Keena played Abby Morgan on The WB's Dawson's Creek (1998–1999), Rachel Lindquist on Fox's Undeclared (2001–2002), Kristen on HBO's Entourage (2004–2005), and Bonnie Crasnoff on ABC's Grey's Anatomy (2005; 2007).

== Early life ==
Keena was born and raised in Brooklyn, New York City. Her parents are William Junior, a financial sales manager, and Mary Catherine Keena, a nurse. She grew up with a sister, Samantha, two years older.

Keena attended Saint Ann's, a progressive private school in Brooklyn Heights. She auditioned for LaGuardia High School of Performing Arts at the age of 13, and was accepted into both the dramatic and vocal arts departments.

== Career ==
Following her television film debut in A Promise Kept: The Oksana Baiul Story, where she played the title character, Keena took a supporting role in the 1995 romantic comedy While You Were Sleeping. Her first major roles in feature films came in 1997, starring as Lilliana "Lilli" Hoffman in the folklore-inspired gothic horror film, Snow White: A Tale of Terror, and a minor role in Taylor Hackford's The Devil's Advocate.

In the Rob Schmidt-directed Crime and Punishment in Suburbia (2000), Keena played the principal role of Roseanne Skolnick, an outwardly popular high schooler with a dysfunctional home life. Describing it as "messy but hungry ... the kind of movie that lives and breathes", film critic Roger Ebert said of Keena, "[She] does a great deal with Roseanne, a character who is herself an actress–pretending to be a daughter, a girlfriend, a cheerleader, all the time screaming inside". Suburbia was nominated for the Grand Jury Prize at that year's Sundance Film Festival.

Keena starred as "final girl" Lori Campbell in the 2003 slasher film, Freddy vs. Jason, a crossover between the Nightmare on Elm Street and Friday the 13th franchises. Directed by Ronny Yu, FvJ was a financial success, grossing USD$117 million at the box office. A mixture of parts in mainstream and independent comedies—Bad Girls from Valley High, Man of the House (both 2005), Fifty Pills (2006)—came next, as did the Mafia drama Brooklyn Rules (2007) and a headline role in the 2009 remake of 1988 horror film Night of the Demons. In 2025, she starred as Lorna in How to Survive Hollywood directed by Paul Ruven.

Alongside recurring appearances as Abby Morgan on Dawson's Creek (1998–1999), Kristen on Entourage (2004–2005), and a starring role as college student Rachel Lindquist on Judd Apatow's short-lived cult hit sitcom, Undeclared (2001–2002), Keena played a string of television guest roles throughout the 2000s, on series such as Law & Order: Criminal Intent, Without a Trace, and CSI. For her portrayal of Bonnie Crasnoff—a patient who is severely injured in a train accident—on the second season of medical drama Grey's Anatomy, Keena was nominated for a 2006 Gold Derby Award and the Online Film & Television Association Award. The episode attracted a U.S. audience of 16.67 million viewers and received universal praise from critics, with many since referring to it as one of the series' greatest episodes.

== Personal life ==
During the filming of Night of the Demons (2009), Keena became romantically involved with her co-star, Edward Furlong. The pair dated for four years, with Furlong being arrested on three occasions between 2012 and 2013 for physically assaulting Keena, eventually spending six months in jail.

She has rekindled with Furlong numerous times since.

== Filmography ==
Film
Year	Title	Role	Notes
1995	While You Were Sleeping	Mary Callaghan	
1996	Ripe	Violet	
1997	Snow White: A Tale of Terror	Lilliana "Lilli" Hoffman	
1997	The Devil's Advocate	Alessandra Cullen	
1998	All I Wanna Do	Tinka Parker	
2000	The Simian Line	Marta	
2000	Crime and Punishment in Suburbia	Roseanne Skolnick	
2002	Orange County	Gretchen	
2003	Freddy vs. Jason	Lori Campbell	
2005	Bad Girls from Valley High	Brooke	
2005	Man of the House	Evie	
2005	Long Distance	Nicole Freeman	
2006	Fifty Pills	Petunia	
2006	The Lather Effect	Warm Leatherette Babe #1	
2006	Left in Darkness	Celia	
2007	Brooklyn Rules	Amy	
2008	Loaded	Brooke	
2008	Corporate Affairs	Snowy Egret	
2008	The Narrows	Gina Abruzzi	
2009	Fault Line		
2009	Night of the Demons	Maddie	
2010	Never Sleep Again: The Elm Street Legacy	Herself	Documentary film
2011	Walter Don't Dance	Phyliss	Short film
2012	40 Days and Nights	Tessa	
2012	Aftermath	Elizabeth	
2013	Isolated	Ambassador for Peace	
2013	Crystal Lake Memories: The Complete History of Friday the 13th	Herself	Documentary film
2017	The Ghost and the Whale	Dr. Sweetie Jones	
2020	Klaus Eats Butterflies	Molly	Short film
2025	How to Survive Hollywood	Lorna	Feature film
2026	Last Chance Motel	Sugar	Feature film

Television
Year	Title	Role	Notes
1994	A Promise Kept: The Oksana Baiul Story	Oksana Baiul	Television film
1995	Law & Order	Corey Russell	Episode: "Performance"
1997	Feds	Tina Walters	Episode: "Somebody's Lyin'"
1997	Homicide: Life on the Street	Billie Rader	Episode: "Double Blind"
1998–1999	Dawson's Creek	Abby Morgan	Recurring; 14 episodes
1999	First Daughter	Jess Hayes	Television film
2001–2002	Undeclared	Rachel Lindquist	Main role
2003	King of the Hill	Various (voice)	Episodes: "I Never Promised You an Organic Garden", "Night and Deity"
2004–2005	Entourage	Kristen	Recurring; 6 episodes
2005	Law & Order: Criminal Intent	Beatrice Onorato Mailer	Episode: "Death Roe"
2005, 2007	Grey's Anatomy	Bonnie Crasnoff	Episodes: "Into You Like a Train", "Some Kind of Miracle"
2006	Without a Trace	Heidi Peyton	Episode: "More Than This"
2006	CSI: Crime Scene Investigation	Madeline	Episode: "Built to Kill: Part 2"
2006	All She Wants for Christmas	Judith "Noelle" Dunn	Television film
2007	Ghost Whisperer	Holly Newman	Episode: "Deja Boo"
2009	Robot Chicken	Executive; Woman (voice)	Episode: "President Hu Forbids It"
2010	Private Practice	Kayla	3 episodes
2010	The Closer	Debbie Shriner	Episode: "Last Woman Standing"
2011	Castle	Charlene McCann	Episode: "Countdown"
2011	Beavis and Butt-Head	Various (voice)	6 episodes

Video games
Year	Title	Role
2006	The Sopranos: Road to Respect	Trishelle

== Awards and nominations ==
Year	Award	Category	Nominated work	Result	Ref.
2005	Online Film & Television Association Awards	Best Guest Actress in a Drama Series	Grey's Anatomy	Nominated	
2006	Gold Derby Awards	Supporting Actress — Drama	Grey's Anatomy	Nominated	
2025	Bangkok Movie Awards	Best Actress	How to Survive Hollywood	Won	
2025	LA Film Awards	Best Actress in an Indie Film	How to Survive Hollywood	Won	
2025	Mannheim Arts and Film Festival	Best Actress — Feature Film (Note: During the 2025 edition of the Mannheim Arts and Film Festival Keena won the "Best Actress in a Feature Film" award twice — in September and October 2025.)	How to Survive Hollywood	Won	
