= Into You Like a Train =

- Grey's Anatomy episode
- Episode no.: Season 2 Episode 6
- Directed by: Jeff Melman
- Written by: Krista Vernoff
- Production code: 201
- Original air date: October 30, 2005 (ABC)
- Running time: 43 minutes

Guest appearances
- Kate Walsh as Dr. Addison Montgomery; Monica Keena as Bonnie Crasnoff; Bruce A. Young as Tom Maynard; Kym Whitley as Yvonne; Cynthia Ettinger as Jana; Juliette Jeffers as Mary; Michelle Arthur as Brooke; Steven W. Bailey as Joe

Episode chronology
| ← Previous "Bring the Pain" | Next → "Something to Talk About" |
- Grey's Anatomy season 2

"Into You Like a Train" is the sixth episode of the second season of the American television medical drama Grey's Anatomy, and the show's fifteenth episode overall.

Written by Krista Vernoff and directed by Jeff Melman, the episode aired on ABC in the United States on October 30, 2005.

The track was also covered by the band Jawbreaker as a bonus track for the 2004 reissue of their album Dear You (1995).

On its initial airing, the episode garnered an American audience of 16.67 million viewers and received universal acclaim upon telecast, with critics referring to it as the best episode of the show at numerous occasions.

Vernoff received a nomination for the Primetime Emmy Award for Outstanding Writing for a Drama Series for her work on the episode.

== Plot ==
The episode opens with a voice-over narration from Meredith Grey (Ellen Pompeo) about balancing the need for control with embracing uncertainty and hope.

As Meredith Grey (Ellen Pompeo) nervously awaits Derek Shepherd's (Patrick Dempsey) final decision about their relationship, her thoughts are interrupted when a train crash brings several critically injured patients to Seattle Grace Hospital, including Bonnie Crasnoff (Monica Keena) and Tom Maynard (Bruce A. Young), two passengers who have been impaled on the same metal pole. The only way to remove the pole is through a high-risk surgery where one of the two must be slid back on the pole, an action that would likely result in their death. Tom, a man in his 50s, offers to sacrifice himself to save Bonnie, who is in her late 20s, engaged, and awaiting her fiancé's arrival at the hospital.

Despite Tom's offer, the doctors determine that Bonnie's injuries are more severe, making her the one to be moved on the pole. All the doctors involved promise to do everything possible to save both patients. However, during surgery, after Bonnie is removed from the pole, she begins to crash. The doctors work on her briefly but soon conclude she is "unsavable" and shift their focus to Tom, who has a better chance of surviving. Meredith, distraught, remains by Bonnie's side as she dies, pleading, "What about her? We can't just abandon her!" This situation reflects Meredith's feelings of abandonment as Derek returns to his unfaithful wife, Addison.

In the ER, Alex Karev (Justin Chambers) is performing sutures but fails to notice a woman bleeding internally, leading to her death. Meanwhile, Addison Montgomery (Kate Walsh) sees great potential in Izzie Stevens (Katherine Heigl), who faces a difficult choice—whether to remain loyal to her friend Meredith or seize a professional opportunity.

== Music ==
- "Blood and Peanut Butter" – B.C. Camplight
- "Back Where I Was" – The Hereafter
- "The City Lights" – Umbrellas
- "Today Has Been Okay" – Emilíana Torrini

== Reception ==
"Into You Like a Train" received universal acclaim upon its initial airing and has been referred to as one of the best episodes of Grey's Anatomy on numerous occasions.

The A.V. Club included it in its list of the best TV episodes of the decade in November 2009, noting that the episode "turned melodramatic excess into great, goofy fun". Variety also listed the episode in its Top 10 Most Bizarre Medical Maladies encountered in the series.

Outside the United States, the episode garnered similar high praise. Indielondon described the episode as "compelling" for the way it "manipulates your emotions—you’ll laugh, cry, and feel like screaming at the TV". They further added, "There’s no denying the brilliance of the episode. It’s provocative viewing that forces you to have an opinion while becoming emotionally involved with its characters. You’ll love and hate it in equal measure—and that can only be a good thing!"

The episode continued to be highly praised over time. In 2013, The A.V. Club reaffirmed it as "the best single episode the show ever produced".

Due to the positive fan reception, Monica Keena reprised her role as Bonnie Crasnoff, despite her character's death, in Season 3, Episode 17, "Some Kind of Miracle". appearing as a ghost while Meredith Grey (Ellen Pompeo) was in limbo.

== Awards ==
Krista Vernoff received a nomination for the Primetime Emmy Award for Outstanding Writing for a Drama Series for her work on the episode.
