= Jillian Armenante =

American television and film actress

- Born: July 5, 1964 (age 62)
- Occupation: Actress
- Years active: 1991–present
- Spouse: Alice Dodd
- Children: 2

Jillian Armenante (born July 5, 1964) is an American television and film actress, known for playing the role of Donna Kozlowski on the TV show Judging Amy.

== Life and career ==
Armenante grew up in Wyckoff, New Jersey.

Her feature-film credits include Vice, Hail, Caesar!, Bad Teacher, A Mighty Heart, North Country and Girl, Interrupted. On television, Armenante has made guest appearances on several shows including Fresh Off the Boat, The Mayor, Shameless, Medium, Party Down, Castle, The Closer, Private Practice, Grey's Anatomy, Las Vegas, ER, Six Feet Under, The West Wing, and Northern Exposure.

With Alice Dodd, her wife, Armenante co-produced, co-directed and co-wrote Laura Comstock's Bag-Punching Dog and In Flagrante Gothicto at the Circle X Theatre Company. Laura Comstock's Bag-Punching Dog won the Theatre L.A. Ovation Award for "Best New Musical" and "Best Musical Production".

In Flagrante Gothicto was produced at The Empty Space Theatre in Seattle in their 2003 season.

Armenante directed the world premiere of Great Men Of Science, Nos. 21 & 22. The show received a Theatre L.A. Ovation Award for "Best Production in a 99 seat theatre", and The L.A. Weekly Award for Best Production. She also produced The Texarkansas Waltz at Circle X Theatre.

Regionally, she has acted at the Empty Space Theatre in the title role of The Salvation Of Iggy Scrooge; at the Group Theatre in Marisol; at New City Theatre in Stript and 3 Americanisms.

She played "Melony" in a stage version of The Cider House Rules which was performed at The Atlantic Theater in New York City, the Seattle Repertory Theatre, and at The Mark Taper Forum in Los Angeles. For this role she was nominated for a Drama Desk Award, received a Garland Award and a Theatre World Award for "Debut on the New York Stage". The show also received a Theatre L.A. Ovation Award for "Best Production in a Larger Theatre".

In Seattle, she was a member of Annex Theatre for eight years, where she appeared in The Fatty Arbuckle Spookhouse Review, Bessemer's Spectacles, Tattoo Girl, and Hamlet The Musical. At Annex, she directed Triplets In Uniform, Exquisite Torture, and Running From Boomerangs. She was the Associate Artistic Director for Alice B. Theatre where she produced Pretty, Witty and Gay and Memory Tricks by Marga Gomez at the Broadway Performance Hall.

== Filmography ==
=== Film ===
Year	Title	Role	Notes
1997	The Wright Brothers	Col. Kovacevich	
1999	Delivered	Danielle	
1999	Girl, Interrupted	Cynthia Crowley	
2003	Frankie and Johnny Are Married	Cynthia	
2005	North Country	Peg	
2007	A Mighty Heart	Maureen Platt	
2007	The Gray Man	Delia Budd	
2008	Prairie Fever	Lettie	Video
2009	Shrink	Karen	
2010	Not Your Time	Debbie	Short
2011	Bad Teacher	Ms. Pavicic	
2012	The Dark Knight Rises	Lawyer's Clerk	
2013	Trust Me	Sandy	
2014	TSA America: Yeah, But Is It Ticking?	Officer Shears	Short
2014	Mr Maple Leaf	Cousin Zelda	Short
2016	Hail, Caesar!	Script Girl	
2018	Vice	Karen Hughes	
2019	The Untold Story	Patty	Completed
2019	Stuck	Officer Wheeler	

=== Television ===
Year	Title	Role	Notes
1993	Northern Exposure	Chef's Assistant	"The Big Feast"
1994	Northern Exposure	Olympias	"Baby Blues"
1997	Cracker	Ina Gardener, RN	"Hell Hath No Fury"
1999	The West Wing	Leela	"Five Votes Down"
1999–05	Judging Amy	Donna Kozlowski	Main role; 101 episodes
2004–05	Strong Medicine	Francine "Frankie" Biancavilla	"The Real World Rittenhouse", "Family Practice"
2005	Unscripted	Director	"1.6"
2005	Six Feet Under	Shirley	"Hold My Hand"
2005	ER	Tamara Gordon	"All About Christmas Eve"
2006	Grey's Anatomy	Mindy Carlson	"It's the End of the World", "As We Know It"
2006	Smith	Nash	"Two", "Three"
2007	Las Vegas	Beth Lipshitz	"Run, Cooper, Run!"
2008	Gorgeous Tiny Chicken Machine Show	Bonny Bonnom	"Surprise Party"
2008	The Closer	Norma Patterson	"Cherry Bomb"
2008	Terminator: The Sarah Connor Chronicles	Rita	"Allison from Palmdale", "Brothers of Nablus"
2008	Untitled Victoria Pile Project	Det. Grace Dillon	Unsold TV pilot
2009	Private Practice	Arlene Perkins	"Contamination"
2009	Numb3rs	Claire Wells	"First Law"
2009	Castle	Susan Mailer	"Ghosts"
2009	Hawthorne	Cheryl Brooks	"Pilot", "Healing Time", "The Sense of Belonging"
2009	Dollhouse	Grace	"The Public Eye"
2010	Party Down	Mona	"Not on Your Wife Opening Night"
2011	Medium	Veronica Tate	"Labor Pains"
2011	Shameless	Abby Ruggiero	"Aunt Ginger"
2011	Memphis Beat	Dolores Toscano	"Flesh and Blood"
2011	In Plain Sight	Dr. Perez	"A Womb with a View"
2011	The Guild	Lizette	"Downturn", "Grande Finale"
2011	Desperate Housewives	Rachel	"School of Hard Knocks", "The Art of Making Art"
2012	Scandal	Moira O'Donnell	"White Hats Off"
2013	Arrested Development	Armstrong	"Off the Hook"
2013	New Girl	Eileen	"The Box"
2015	Kittens in a Cage	Barbara	Regular role
2015	Better Call Saul	Paula	"RICO"
2015	The Fosters	Shaz	"Daughters"
2015	Dropping the Soap	Melanie	Regular role
2015–2019	Fresh Off the Boat	Nancy	Recurring role; 18 episodes
2017	The Mayor	Kitty	"Pilot", "City Hall-oween"
2017	Hank'n Barry	Lindsay	TV film, post-production
2021	The Sex Lives of College Girls	Coach Woods	5 episodes
2022-2023	Physical	Woman in recovery	7 episodes
2026	NCIS (TV series)	Secretary of the Navy Helen Marsh	1 Episode

== Other work ==
Year	Title	Notes
2016	Kittens in a Cage	Executive producer, director, writer
2016	The List	Producer, director
2016	Hank'n Barry	Executive producer, collaborating director, co-writer, editor
2017	Stuck	Executive producer, director
