= Teen Choice Award for Choice Drama Series =

Entertainment award category

The following is a list of Teen Choice Award winners and nominees for the Choice TV Drama Series award, which was formerly known as the Choice TV Action/Drama Series award. The television series with the most wins in this category is Pretty Little Liars, with 5 wins.

== Winners and nominees ==
=== 1990s ===
| Year | Winner | Nominees | Ref. |
|---|---|---|---|
| 1999 | Dawson's Creek | 7th Heaven; Buffy the Vampire Slayer; Charmed; ER; Felicity; Party of Five; The X-Files | |

=== 2000s ===
| Year | Winner | Nominees | Ref. |
|---|---|---|---|
| 2000 | Dawson's Creek | 7th Heaven; Buffy the Vampire Slayer; Charmed; Felicity; Get Real; Once and Again; Roswell | |
| 2001 | 7th Heaven | Boston Public; Buffy the Vampire Slayer; Dark Angel; Dawson's Creek; Felicity; Gilmore Girls; Roswell | |
| 2002 | 7th Heaven | Alias; Buffy the Vampire Slayer; Dark Angel; Dawson's Creek; Felicity; Gilmore Girls; Smallville | |
| 2003 | 7th Heaven | 24; Alias; American Dreams; Buffy the Vampire Slayer; Dawson's Creek; Fastlane; Smallville | |
| 2004 | The O.C. | 7th Heaven; Alias; American Dreams; Everwood; Joan of Arcadia; One Tree Hill; Smallville | |
| 2005 | The O.C. | 7th Heaven; Alias; Everwood; Grey's Anatomy; House; Lost; One Tree Hill | |
| 2006 | The O.C. | Grey's Anatomy; House; Lost; One Tree Hill; Smallville | |
| 2007 | Grey's Anatomy | Heroes; House; Kyle XY; Lost | |
| 2008 | Gossip Girl | Friday Night Lights; Grey's Anatomy; House; One Tree Hill | |
| 2009 | Gossip Girl | 90210; Grey's Anatomy; House; The Secret Life of the American Teenager | |

=== 2010s ===
| Year | Winner | Nominees | Ref. |
|---|---|---|---|
| 2010 | Gossip Girl | 90210; Grey's Anatomy; House; The Secret Life of the American Teenager | |
| 2011 | Gossip Girl | Bones; House; Make It or Break It; The Secret Life of the American Teenager | |
| 2012 | Pretty Little Liars | Bones; Gossip Girl; Revenge; Touch | |
| 2013 | Pretty Little Liars | Gossip Girl; Nashville; Revenge; Switched at Birth | |
| 2014 | Pretty Little Liars | The Fosters; Hart of Dixie; Switched at Birth; Twisted | |
| 2015 | Pretty Little Liars | Castle; Empire; The Fosters; Grey's Anatomy; Nashville | |
| 2016 | Pretty Little Liars | Empire; Gotham; Grey's Anatomy; Rosewood; Shades of Blue | |
| 2017 | Riverdale | Empire; Famous in Love; Pretty Little Liars; Star; This Is Us | |
| 2018 | Riverdale | Empire; Famous in Love; The Fosters; Star; This Is Us | |
| 2019 | Riverdale | Good Trouble; Pretty Little Liars: The Perfectionists; The Resident; Runaways; Star | |
