= Mark Wilding =

American TV producer

Mark Wilding is an American television producer and screenwriter. He was nominated for two Emmys for his work as executive producer on the series Grey's Anatomy, and won a Writers Guild of America Award for Best New Series as a writer on the same show. He has also worked on Private Practice and Charmed.

Wilding graduated from the University of Massachusetts Amherst in 1979 with a major in economics. While at UMass Amherst, he wrote a humor column for The Collegian. He has two children.

Wilding has worked on medical drama series Grey's Anatomy since its debut in 2005, serving as executive producer for five episodes and co-executive producer for over fifty episodes. He was a screenwriter for an additional five episodes from 2005 to 2007. He has also worked on the supernatural drama Charmed as the supervising producer and co-producer for a total of over thirty episodes, as well as screenwriter for another four.

He has also produced for Jesse, Ellen, Jake 2.0 and Good Girls. He has written episodes for all the series previously mentioned, in addition to Becker, Dave's World, and The Naked Truth.

Nearly 30 years after receiving his University of Massachusetts degree, Wilding returned to the Amherst campus to speak as an Eleanor Bateman scholar in residence. On April 29, 2009, Wilding discussed his 15+ year career in the film and television industry, shedding light on the creative processes behind the hit television series Grey's Anatomy. According to the Massachusetts Daily Collegian, University Chancellor Robert C. Holub presented Wilding with a clock/plaque commemorating his achievements in the industry.
