= Betsy Beers =

American television and film producer (born 1957)

- Born: 1957 (age 68–69)
- Education: Williams College
- Occupation: Television producer
- Years active: 1993–present

Betsy Beers (born 1957) is an American television and film producer whose credits include ShondaLand's Grey's Anatomy, Scandal, Private Practice, How to Get Away with Murder, The Catch, Station 19, For the People, and Bridgerton.

== Early life and education ==
Beers is a 1975 graduate of the Milton Academy. She went on to graduate from Williams College where she studied theater and English literature. Beers acted and performed comedy for several years in New York City before moving to Los Angeles to make the transition to producing.

== Career ==
Beers served as president of director Mike Newell’s Dogstar Films, where she produced the films 200 Cigarettes, starring Ben Affleck, Dave Chappelle, and Kate Hudson, and Best Laid Plans, starring Reese Witherspoon. She also developed such films as High Fidelity, directed by Stephen Frears and starring John Cusack, as well as Pushing Tin, starring Billy Bob Thornton, Cate Blanchett, and Angelina Jolie. She also served as Executive Producer on the films Safe Passage, starring Susan Sarandon, and Witch Hunt, starring Dennis Hopper, with producer Gale Ann Hurd.

She then served as president of the Mark Gordon Company. While there, she oversaw the development and production of its feature film and television projects, including the development of Grey's Anatomy. Additionally, Ms. Beers produced the feature films The Hoax, starring Richard Gere, and Casanova, starring Heath Ledger; both films were directed by Lasse Hallström.

In 2009, Beers partnered with Shonda Rhimes' production company ShondaLand to develop and produce additional feature film and television projects.

Beers serves on the Motion Picture & Television Fund (MPTF) Board of Governors.

== Recognition ==
For her work on Grey's Anatomy, Beers and her fellow producers were awarded the 2007 Producer of the Year Award from the Producers Guild of America, the 2007 Golden Globe Award for Best Television Series Drama, and received the 2006 and 2007 Emmy nominations for Outstanding Drama Series. Beers has been nominated three times by the Producers Guild of America for their Television Producer of the Year Award.

In 2014, Scandal was awarded the American Film Institute's Television Program of the Year Award. as well as a Peabody Award.
