= Teen Choice Award for Choice TV Actress Drama =

Entertainment award category

The following is a list of Teen Choice Award winners and nominees for the Choice TV Actress – Drama award, which was formerly known as the Choice TV Actress – Action/Drama award.

== Winners and nominees ==
=== 2000s ===
Year	Winner	Nominees	Ref.
2002	Sarah Michelle Gellar – Buffy the Vampire Slayer	Jessica Alba – Dark Angel; Lauren Ambrose – Six Feet Under; Alexis Bledel – Gilmore Girls; Jessica Biel – 7th Heaven; Jennifer Garner – Alias; Katie Holmes – Dawson's Creek; Keri Russell – Felicity	
2003	Sarah Michelle Gellar – Buffy the Vampire Slayer	Jessica Biel – 7th Heaven; Jennifer Garner – Alias; Katie Holmes – Dawson's Creek; Kristin Kreuk – Smallville; Brittany Snow – American Dreams; Tiffany Thiessen – Fastlane; Emily VanCamp – Everwood	
2004	Jennifer Garner – Alias	Mischa Barton – The O.C.; Rachel Bilson – The O.C.; Hilarie Burton – One Tree Hill; Kristin Kreuk – Smallville; Brittany Snow – American Dreams; Amber Tamblyn – Joan of Arcadia; Emily VanCamp – Everwood	
2005	Rachel Bilson – The O.C.	Mischa Barton – The O.C.; Hilarie Burton – One Tree Hill; Sophia Bush – One Tree Hill; Jennifer Garner – Alias; Evangeline Lilly – Lost; Beverly Mitchell – 7th Heaven; Emily VanCamp – Everwood	
2006	Rachel Bilson – The O.C.	Kristen Bell – Veronica Mars; Sophia Bush – One Tree Hill; Katherine Heigl – Grey's Anatomy; Kristin Kreuk – Smallville; Evangeline Lilly – Lost	
2007	Hayden Panettiere – Heroes	Emily Deschanel – Bones; Katherine Heigl – Grey's Anatomy; Jennifer Love Hewitt – Ghost Whisperer; Evangeline Lilly – Lost	
2008	Blake Lively – Gossip Girl	Hilarie Burton – One Tree Hill; Sophia Bush – One Tree Hill; Katherine Heigl – Grey's Anatomy; Leighton Meester – Gossip Girl	
2009	Leighton Meester – Gossip Girl	Minka Kelly – Friday Night Lights; Blake Lively – Gossip Girl; Olivia Wilde – House; Shailene Woodley – The Secret Life of the American Teenager	

=== 2010s ===
Year	Winner	Nominees	Ref.
2010	Leighton Meester – Gossip Girl	Sophia Bush – One Tree Hill; Blake Lively – Gossip Girl; Olivia Wilde – House; Shailene Woodley – The Secret Life of the American Teenager	
2011	Blake Lively – Gossip Girl	Emily Deschanel – Bones; Josie Loren – Make It or Break It; Olivia Wilde – House; Shailene Woodley – The Secret Life of the American Teenager	
2012	Lucy Hale – Pretty Little Liars	Emily Deschanel – Bones; Sarah Michelle Gellar – Ringer; Leighton Meester – Gossip Girl; Emily VanCamp – Revenge	
2013	Troian Bellisario – Pretty Little Liars	Blake Lively – Gossip Girl; Vanessa Marano – Switched at Birth; Hayden Panettiere – Nashville; Emily VanCamp – Revenge	
2014	Lucy Hale – Pretty Little Liars	Troian Bellisario – Pretty Little Liars; Rachel Bilson – Hart of Dixie; Maddie Hasson – Twisted; Maia Mitchell – The Fosters	
2015	Lucy Hale – Pretty Little Liars	Taraji P. Henson – Empire; Maia Mitchell – The Fosters; Shay Mitchell – Pretty Little Liars; Hayden Panettiere – Nashville; Kerry Washington – Scandal	
2016	Ashley Benson – Pretty Little Liars	Troian Bellisario – Pretty Little Liars; Taraji P. Henson – Empire; Jennifer Lopez – Shades of Blue; Maia Mitchell – The Fosters; Kerry Washington – Scandal	
2017	Lucy Hale – Pretty Little Liars	Troian Bellisario – Pretty Little Liars; Ashley Benson – Pretty Little Liars; Shay Mitchell – Pretty Little Liars; Sasha Pieterse – Pretty Little Liars; Bella Thorne – Famous in Love	
2018	Lili Reinhart – Riverdale	Ryan Destiny – Star; Camila Mendes – Riverdale; Chrissy Metz – This Is Us; Maia Mitchell – The Fosters; Bella Thorne – Famous in Love	
2019	Lili Reinhart – Riverdale	Sofia Carson – Pretty Little Liars: The Perfectionists; Ryan Destiny – Star; Maia Mitchell – Good Trouble; Camila Mendes – Riverdale; Cierra Ramírez – Good Trouble	
