= Kip Koenig =

Kip Koenig is an American film and television producer and screenwriter.

Koenig's most notable work has been on medical drama Grey's Anatomy, for which he has served as supervising producer and consulting producer for dozens of episodes, and has written an additional three episodes. His other television credits include Still Life, Septuplets and The American Embassy, for all of which he has served as executive producer and producer, and has written for.

He has also written and produced Bio-Dome, a 1996 film, and has written a single episode of Wasteland. He directed the 1998 film How to Make the Cruelest Month, the only directing credit to his name.
