= Mimi Schmir =

American screenwriter

Mimi Schmir is an American television producer and screenwriter. Her most notable work has been for the medical drama Grey's Anatomy, for which she has served as producer, supervising producer and writer for over thirty episodes, and the legal drama Shark, as writer and consulting producer.

Aside from her Grey's Anatomy and Shark work, she wrote episodes for Promised Land, Party of Five and Felicity. She was also credited as executive story editor for several episodes of Felicity.

She was nominated, along with the rest of the Grey's Anatomy crew, for two Emmys in 2006 and 2007, both for "Outstanding Drama Series". Also for the Grey's Anatomy crew, she won the Writers Guild of America Award for "New Series" in 2006, and was nominated for two others in 2006 and 2007, both in the "Dramatic Series" category.

== Personal life ==
Schmir was married to late TV producer and writer Gary Glasberg, with whom she had two sons, Dash and Eli. Glasberg died in his sleep on September 28, 2016, in Los Angeles at the age of 50.
