= Peter Horton =

American actor and director

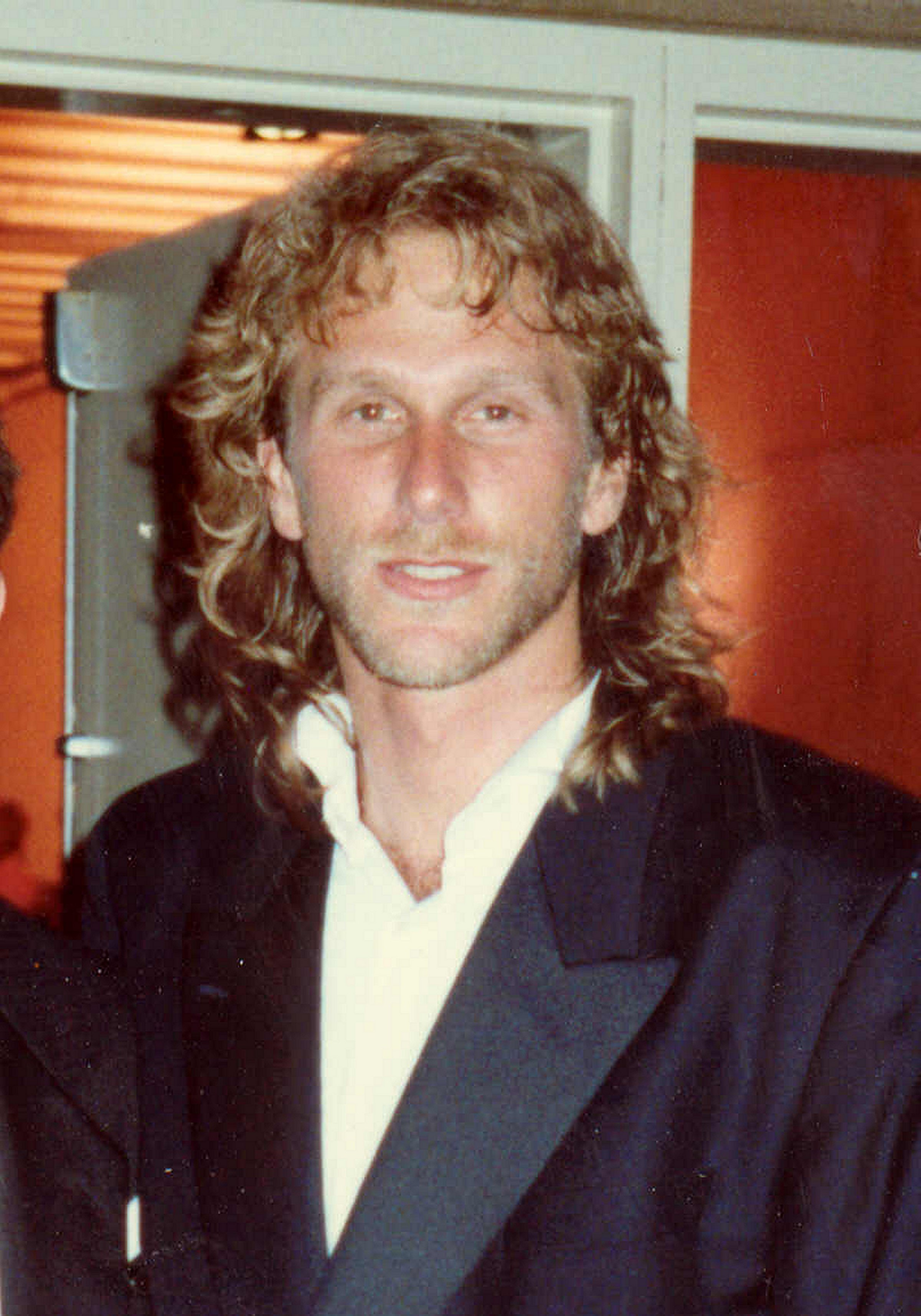
- Horton in 1988
- Born: August 20, 1953 (age 73); Bellevue, Washington, U.S.
- Education: University of California, Santa Barbara (BA)
- Occupations: Actor, director
- Years active: 1964–present
- Spouses: Michelle Pfeiffer (m. 1981; div. 1988) Nicole Deputron (m. 1995)
- Children: 2

Peter Horton (born August 20, 1953) is an American actor and director. He played Professor Gary Shepherd on the television series Thirtysomething from 1987 until 1991.

== Life ==
Horton was born in Bellevue, Washington, to a father who worked in the shipping business. He attended Redwood High School in Marin County, California, and Principia College in Illinois. He later attended University of California, Santa Barbara, where he received a Bachelor of Arts degree in music composition.

During his run on Thirtysomething, People magazine named him one of the "50 Most Beautiful People." Horton acted in television shows including St. Elsewhere, The White Shadow, Dallas, Eight Is Enough, In Treatment and The Geena Davis Show, played the lead in the short-lived series Brimstone, and played Crane McFadden in the one-season series (1982–1983) Seven Brides for Seven Brothers. He played Jacob in the 1982 feature film Split Image, Father Mahoney in the 1986 feature film Where the River Runs Black, Roy Fox in the 1996 film Two Days in the Valley, and played Burt in the 1984 Stephen King movie Children of the Corn. He had a minor role in Cameron Crowe's Seattle romantic comedy, Singles. He played Harry Landers in the "Hospital" skit from Amazon Women on the Moon opposite wife Michelle Pfeiffer, whom he had previously directed in the ABC Afterschool Special One Too Many in 1985. Horton also appeared in the 1997 TV movie version of the Jon Krakauer book Into Thin Air: Death on Everest, playing Scott Fischer, the leader of the disastrous 1996 climb on Mount Everest. He was also in the movie Sideout (1990) as Zach Barnes, a down-and-out ex-volleyball champ. As a director he has worked on several television series including The Shield, Thirtysomething, The Wonder Years, Once and Again, and directed the pilot for Grey's Anatomy as well as pilots for Class of '96, Birdland, Dirty Sexy Money, The Philanthropist and Reconstruction. He directed the 1990 film for television Extreme Close-Up as well as the 1995 feature film The Cure. As a producer, he produced Reconstruction (which he co-created), Lone Star, The Philanthropist, The Body Politic (which he also co-created), Grey's Anatomy, Six Degrees and Murder Live (for which he wrote the story).

He appeared in Who Killed the Electric Car? and is on the board of directors of the Environmental Alliance.

As of 2010, Horton is an executive producer and director of Grey's Anatomy on ABC, and produced and directed NBC's The Philanthropist. In 2015, he signed a deal with Universal TV. His production company is Pico Creek Productions. Horton co-created the 2015 series American Odyssey.

In the late 1970s, Horton dated actress Valerie Harper. Horton has been married twice. His first marriage was to Michelle Pfeiffer, whom he met in Milton Katselas's acting class. The couple married in 1981. Of their relationship, Pfeiffer reflected, "I broke one of my own Ten Commandments never to date an actor, especially one you study with. Then I married one!" The couple divorced in 1988. The divorce was amicable, with Horton saying both his and Pfeiffer's devotion to their careers affected the marriage.

== Filmography ==
=== Film ===
Year	Title	Role	Notes
1980	Serial	Cult Member 4	
1980	Fade to Black	Joey	
1982	Split Image	Jacob	
1984	Children of the Corn	Burt	
1986	Where the River Runs Black	Father Mahoney	
1987	Amazon Women on the Moon	Harry Landers	
1990	Side Out	Zack Barnes	
1992	Singles	Jamie	
1995	The Baby-Sitters Club	Patrick	
1996	2 Days in the Valley	Roy Foxx	
1997	The End of Violence	Brian	
1998	T-Rex: Back to the Cretaceous	Dr. Donald Hayden	
2004	The Dust Factory	Lionel	
2005	Happy Endings	Ted the Urologist	Uncredited
2005	The Naked Brothers Band: The Movie	Peter Horton	
2018	Family	Charlie	

=== Television ===
Year	Title	Role	Notes
1979	The White Shadow	Raymond Collins	Episode: "One of the Boys"
1979	Kaz	Ron	Episode: "Trouble on the South Side"
1979	Dallas	Wayne	2 episodes
1979	The Runaways	Sam Barnard	Episode: "Throwaway Child"
1979	She's Dressed to Kill	Tony Smith	Television film
1979	Eight Is Enough	Marty / Eric	2 episodes
1981	Miracle on Ice	Jack O'Callahan	Television film
1981	Freedom	Bill	Television film
1981	Flamingo Road	Scott	Episode: "The Victim"
1982–1983	Seven Brides for Seven Brothers	Crane McFadden	22 episodes
1983	St. Elsewhere	Barry Dorn	Episode: "Lust Et Veritas"
1983	Choices of the Heart	Doug	Television film
1983	Sawyer and Finn	Tom Sawyer	Television film
1987–1991	Thirtysomething	Gary Shepherd	85 episodes
1993	Class of '96	Professor Hartman	Episode: "Pilot"
1994	Children of the Dark	Jim Harrison	Television film
1994	The Gift	Joe	Television film
1996	Death Benefit	Steven Keeney	Television film
1996	Crazy Horse	George Armstrong Custer	Television film
1997	Murder Live!	Lt. Clay Maloney	Television film
1997	Gun	Jack Keyes	Episode: "Columbus Day"
1997	Into Thin Air: Death on Everest	Scott Fischer	Television film
1998	From the Earth to the Moon	Documentary Director	Episode: "We Have Cleared the Tower"
1998–1999	Brimstone	Ezekiel Stone	13 episodes
2000–2001	The Geena Davis Show	Max Ryan	22 episodes
2003	Karen Sisco	Ray Nicolette	Episode: "The One That Got Away"
2003	Thoughtcrimes	Dr. Michael Welles	Television film
2003, 2004	Line of Fire	Nick Brustin	2 episodes
2004	While I Was Gone	Eli Mayhew	Television film
2004	LAX	Alex	Episode: "Abduction"
2007	Six Degrees	Guy at Lunar Eclipse	Episode: "A Simple Twist of Fate"
2007	Brothers & Sisters	Warren Salter	Episode: "Unaired Pilot"
2008	In Treatment	Zack	Episode: "Sophie: Week Nine"
2010	Life Unexpected	Grant Cassidy	Episode: "Father Unfigured"
2012	CSI: NY	Cade Conover	Episode: "2,918 Miles"
2018	New Amsterdam	Cardiologist	Episode: "Pilot"
