= Private Practice season 2 =

Private Practice
- Season 2
- DVD cover art
- Starring: Kate Walsh; Tim Daly; Audra McDonald; Paul Adelstein; KaDee Strickland; Chris Lowell; Taye Diggs; Amy Brenneman
- No. of episodes: 22

Release
- Original network: ABC
- Original release: October 1, 2008 – April 30, 2009

Season chronology
- ← Previous; Season 1 Next → Season 3

The second season of Private Practice, the spin-off series to Grey's Anatomy, premiered on October 1, 2008, and concluded on April 30, 2009. The season consisted of 22 episodes.

== Plot ==
The first half of the second season dealt with the practice's financial troubles. Naomi reveals to Addison that they are in danger of losing the practice due to unpaid debt causing Addison to tell Sam. This in turn causes a shift within the practice making Addison the new boss. Adding to the drama was the competition of a new practice, Pacific Wellcare. This new practice, located within the same building as Oceanside Wellness, was run by Charlotte causing turmoil for her and Cooper.

Another happening within this season is the dynamic between Sam and Naomi who by the finale realize they can no longer be friends as well as the deepening romantic relationship of Cooper and Charlotte. Addison was romantically linked with Kevin Nelson (played by David Sutcliffe), a police officer, but later realized their relationship was going nowhere. Towards the end of the season, Addison falls in love with cardiovascular surgeon Noah Barnes, who as it turns out, is married and is expecting his first child. Matters become more complicated when Addison realizes that Noah's wife is one of her patients. Archer Montgomery (Grant Show), Addison's playboy brother, also made sporadic appearances causing trouble for her and Naomi. Archer was found to be with an aggressive brain tumor which was later diagnosed as parasites. Addison sought the professional help of her ex-husband, Derek Shepherd (Patrick Dempsey). After Derek successfully saved Archer, Addison discovered he was back to his old tricks cheating on Naomi.

Violet stirred some of her own drama when she began dating Sheldon (Brian Benben), who works for Pacific Wellcare, and Pete. During the latter half of the season, Violet was found to be pregnant although she did not know who the father of her baby was. Also, Violet found herself and her unborn baby at the mercy of a psychotic patient bent on taking Violet's baby by any means necessary in the closing moments of the season finale. Meanwhile, Dell struggled with his own issues caused by his former girlfriend's drug habits and the fight for custody of his daughter Betsey. Some of the medical cases that caused a stir and tension among the doctors at Private Practice was the issue of abortion (a first for the practice), the sex reassignment of a newborn, the sexual activity of a 12-year-old, the switching of embryos for two mothers-to-be and a young couple who later discovered they were siblings.

== Cast and characters ==
=== Main cast ===
- Kate Walsh as Addison Montgomery
- Tim Daly as Pete Wilder
- Audra McDonald as Naomi Bennett
- Paul Adelstein as Cooper Freedman
- KaDee Strickland as Charlotte King
- Chris Lowell as Dell Parker
- Taye Diggs as Sam Bennett
- Amy Brenneman as Violet Turner

=== Recurring cast ===
- David Sutcliffe as Kevin Nelson
- Geffri Maya as Maya Bennett
- Brian Benben as Sheldon Wallace
- Hailey Sole as Betsey Parker
- Grant Show as Archer Montgomery
- James Morrison as William White
- Jayne Brook as Meg Porter
- Jay Harrington as Wyatt Lockhart
- Sharon Leal as Sonya
- Amanda Detmer as Morgan Barnes
- Josh Hopkins as Noah Barnes
- Agnes Bruckner as Heather
- Amanda Foreman as Katie Kent
- Sean Bridgers as Frank

=== Special guest stars ===
- Justin Chambers as Alex Karev
- Chandra Wilson as Miranda Bailey
- James Pickens Jr. as Richard Webber
- Eric Dane as Mark Sloan
- Patrick Dempsey as Derek Shepherd

=== Guest stars ===
- Idina Menzel as Lisa King
- Alexis Denisof as Daniel

== Episodes ==
List of Private Practice season 2 episodes
No. overall	No. in season	Title	Directed by	Written by	Original release date	US viewers (millions)
10	1	"A Family Thing"	Mark Tinker	Shonda Rhimes & Marti Noxon	October 1, 2008	8.16
At Oceanside Wellness, friendships are tested and secrets revealed when Addison discovers that Naomi is concealing the practice's financial problems. Dell becomes frustrated at having to keep Naomi's secrets and quits. Addison and Naomi also clash over the ethical issue of whether a patient's baby should be delivered 3 months early (and likely die), so his cord blood could be used to save their other child, who is dying. Meanwhile, Violet wonders what secret Cooper is keeping from her, while Cooper himself has to decide whether or not to reveal a medical secret to a patient.
11	2	"Equal and Opposite"	Tom Verica	Mike Ostrowski	October 8, 2008	7.40
Addison and Sam form a hostile takeover in order to bring the practice out of bankruptcy, as all of the doctors look for additional clients and new income streams, while Violet's friendship with Cooper is on the brink of extinction as Cooper keeps his relationship with Charlotte a secret from her. Addison and Naomi have to break the news to a married couple that they are actually related. Pete challenges Sam over his decision to go against a patient's wishes in order to keep his wealthy father happy.
12	3	"Nothing to Talk About"	Helen Shaver	Ayanna A. Floyd	October 22, 2008	7.98
Charlotte tries to woo Addison to St. Ambrose Hospital with promises of surgeries, as Addison and Kevin's (David Sutcliffe) relationship heats up. Meanwhile Sam uses Naomi to pitch his ideas for saving the practice, Pete's firefighter patient begins cross-dressing as a way of coping with post-traumatic stress disorder, and Violet's patient thinks her son might try to kill her. Naomi confesses to Violet that she is sleeping with Sam, and Addison discovers that Dell has started working at St. Ambrose Hospital, and convinces him to return to the practice.
13	4	"Past Tense"	Michael Pressman	Craig Turk	October 29, 2008	7.93
An office election pits Sam and Naomi against each other to lead the practice, and ends with surprising results, while Addison treats a young Afghan girl who wants to hide her past, and Cooper's objectionable personal life catches up with his professional one. Addison confides in Violet's her fears of progressing her relationship with Kevin. Addison wants things to go back the way it was before the practice was broken, meaning before Sam and Naomi were broken. She enlists the other members of the practice to help arrange a vote as to who runs Oceanside better. Naomi and her soft side approach, or Sam and his businesslike atmosphere. While discussing it a woman (Jayne Brook) comes in and begins kissing Pete, confusing all involved. After each side lobbies for their side it comes down to a vote with Addison abstaining after a speech about patient care. The surprising result is that after a vote for Sam and Naomi both, all other votes are for Addison, who now has no idea what to do.
14	5	"Let It Go"	Michael Zinberg	Lauren Schmidt	November 5, 2008	9.17
In trying to fix the financial troubles at Oceanside Wellness, Addison puts her relationship with her fellow workers in peril, as she keeps Dell on administrative work, interferes with a patient that the practice has known for years and attempts to lease out the office space above much to Naomi and Sam's annoyance. A good friend of Violet's places her in the terrible position of breaking the law to help her, Cooper and Charlotte attempt to take their relationship to the next level while Charlotte is secretive about a job interview, and Maya hopes that her parents, Sam and Naomi, are rekindling their relationship for good.
15	6	"Serving Two Masters"	Joanna Kerns	Emily Halpern	November 19, 2008	7.23
Episode title evokes Matthew 6:24. Addison treats two pregnant women who unknowingly share the same husband, a visit from an Alzheimer's patient and her loving husband (Billy Dee Williams) forces Sam and Naomi to look at their own relationship, the office finds out about Cooper's relationship with Charlotte while Violet confronts Charlotte over her plans to open a new clinic above Oceanside Wellness, and Dell reveals a very special woman in his life to his surprised coworkers. Naomi and Addison finally get their friendship back on track, while Addison panics after Kevin tells her he loves her, which leads to her putting the relationship at risk when she follows him.
16	7	"Tempting Faith"	James Frawley	Jon Cowan & Robert L. Rovner	November 26, 2008	6.33
Addison receives a surprise visit from her brother, Archer (Grant Show), a neurologist. His presence not only causes trouble for her relationship, but for Naomi and Sam as well. Addison and Naomi become concerned when their patients reject treatment that could save her triplets, as they fear angering God. Meanwhile Meg returns to try to make it work with Pete, a patient accused of a malicious crime stirs up anger and emotions for both Violet and Dell, and Violet and Charlotte continue to clash over Charlotte opening a new practice, and when Cooper finds out he breaks up with Charlotte.
17	8	"Crime and Punishment"	Mark Tinker	Shonda Rhimes	December 3, 2008	7.78
Addison and Charlotte have a legal battle to face when the partner of a comatose pregnant woman refuses to let them perform a cesarean section as he hopes his partner will wake up from her coma; Meg ruffles feathers when she begins performing abortions at Oceanside and tempers flare as differing opinions come to light; Violet seeks Kevin's advice when a patient is suspected of killing his wife; Charlotte attempts to rebuild her relationship with Cooper; and Violet meets the new therapist hired for Charlotte's practice, Sheldon (Brian Benben).
18	9	"Know When to Fold"	Jeff Melman	Elizabeth J. B. Klaviter	December 10, 2008	6.86
Charlotte's rival practice, Pacific Wellcare, opens its doors and the competition with Oceanside Wellness begins, as Sam and Pete steal one of their clients they end up in an ethical dilemma where if they treat the patient's knee he could over exert himself and have a heart attack, a patient of Addison's goes to a Pacific Wellcare doctor for a second opinion and the doctor's pompous attitude rubs Addison up the wrong way, and Dell proposes the creation of an in-house adoption program. Charlotte takes a pregnancy test. Violet goes on a date with Sheldon, but after a lackluster sexual experience, she ends up sleeping with Pete.
19	10	"Worlds Apart"	Bethany Rooney	Steve Blackman	December 17, 2008	6.61
Pete's girlfriend, Meg, returns to Los Angeles and notices that Pete and Violet are considerably closer; Kevin questions the direction he and Addison are headed in as a couple when he learns that Addison is treating a call girl; Naomi attracts the ire of the practice when she assists Charlotte and Dr. Wyatt Lockhart (Jay Harrington) with a patient, Cooper treats a young diabetic boy and worries when he finds out that the child could have been kidnapped; and Charlotte and her team of Pacific Wellcare doctors continue to siphon business away from Oceanside Wellness.
20	11	"Contamination"	Kate Woods	Fred Einesman	January 8, 2009	8.98
One of Cooper's patients contracts the measles and forces the quarantine of all those at Oceanside Wellness, and a Health Service worker to visit, who quickly rubs Sam up the wrong way, while Naomi pressures Addison into working with her cocky rival, Wyatt, on a fertility case; meanwhile, Addison wonders whether her relationship with Kevin is worth saving, Cooper tells the practice about Violet and Pete's relationship as they wonder if their friends-with-benefits relationship should move to the next level, and Dell fights for sole custody of his daughter.
21	12	"Homeward Bound"	Mark Tinker	Sal Calleros	January 15, 2009	8.49
As Addison and Kevin struggle in their relationship, she finds herself attracted to Wyatt, the cocky doctor from rival Pacific Wellcare, while Violet seeks a way to carry on relationships with both Pete and Sheldon, and Cooper grows closer to Charlotte when she experiences a family emergency. The doctors treat an entire family suffering from cystic fibrosis, and things get complicated when the daughter has to be separated from the rest of the family due to a bacterial infection. Sam and Violet have to deal with a patient who doesn't want to move to Florida with her son because of a secret. Naomi attempts to find out everything she can about Sam's new girlfriend.
22	13	"Nothing to Fear"	Allison Liddi-Brown	Jon Cowan & Robert Rovner	January 22, 2009	9.49
Violet is pregnant but doesn't know who the father is. Meanwhile Pete and Sam clash when their dying cancer patients wants their assistance in ending his life. Addison is haunted by guilt when Kevin keeps asking about why she was late coming home. After her father's death, Charlotte proposes to Cooper. The patient that Dell inducted into his adoption trial gives birth, but as the baby struggles with a birth defect, all parties involved struggle to make the necessary decisions. Violet tries to help a patient with severe agoraphobia attend her daughter's wedding.
23	14	"Second Chances"	James Frawley	Craig Turk	January 29, 2009	7.74
Archer causes problems between Addison and Naomi, after he moves to LA to work at Pacific Wellcare. Meanwhile, Cooper tries to help Violet talk to both Pete and Sheldon about her pregnancy. Naomi's patient wants to have her daughter's child after she's killed in a car accident, but things get complicated when Violet tells Naomi a family secret. Cooper attempts to restart his relationship with Charlotte after turning down her marriage proposal. Dell is injured when a drug addict overdoses in Pete's office, before accusing the doctors of trying to kill him.
24	15	"Acceptance"	Steve Gomer	Mike Ostrowski	February 5, 2009	12.91
When Archer suffers a seizure, Addison and Naomi search for a cause and a cure. They even have to call Derek for help. Addison and Naomi leave for Seattle at Archer's bedside. Meanwhile, Violet tells Sheldon and Pete about her pregnancy, while Cooper is left to take care of a seven-year-old abandoned patient. Dell is worried when a baby he delivers doesn't exhibit normal behavioral signs. Charlotte's jealousy towards Cooper's friendship with Violet puts obstacles in the way of them reuniting. This is the first part of a four-part crossover with Grey's Anatomy. This episode segues into the Grey's Anatomy episode, "Before and After".
25	16	"Ex-Life"	Mark Tinker	Jon Cowan, Robert Rovner, Krista Vernoff & Debora Cahn	February 12, 2009	14.10
Bailey (Chandra Wilson) and Naomi try to discover why Sam has a sudden asthma attack while Addison helps Derek (Patrick Dempsey) save the life of his pregnant patient. At Oceanside Wellness, Cooper, Violet and Pete work together to treat a mother suffering from postpartum depression. This is the third part of a four-part crossover with Grey's Anatomy which began with the Private Practice episode "Acceptance". This episode picks up from where the Grey's Anatomy episode, "Before and After" left off. It segues into the concluding part "An Honest Mistake". Grey's Anatomy main cast members Justin Chambers, Chandra Wilson, James Pickens, Jr., Eric Dane and Patrick Dempsey are featured as special guest stars.
26	17	"Wait and See"	Michael Zinberg	Steve Blackman	February 19, 2009	11.16
Archer and Naomi grow romantically closer, but Addison discovers that her brother has begun sleeping around again, and she struggles with whether to tell Naomi. Meanwhile, Dell, Addison and Naomi heatedly debate the pros and cons of gender reassignment surgery when their patients' newborn child is born with both male and female sex organs. Violet and Sheldon settle some of their own issues when they co-lead a couples' therapy group. Sonya confronts Sam over why he traveled to Seattle, and worries whether he's committed to her. Pete has a patient who keeps seeing him under mysterious circumstances.
27	18	"Finishing"	Donna Deitch	Shonda Rhimes	March 12, 2009	8.60
Addison is attracted to a colleague at St. Ambrose Hospital who turns out to be more than she bargained for; Pete and Sheldon team up to persuade Violet to take a paternity test, but she firmly resists their efforts; and Naomi helps Sam plan romantic activities with Sonya after he accidentally calls her "Naomi" in bed. Violet and Pete deal with the victim of a carjacking who wants to remember the event. Cooper has a young patient, who requires surgery to have a heart tumor removed, but after a failed operation she decides to go against other surgical options.
28	19	"What Women Want"	Mark Tinker	Lauren Schmidt	March 19, 2009	9.74
After Addison discovers that a mentally unbalanced pregnant patient has lost her baby, Violet must convince her that the baby has died and that surgery is necessary, while Cooper must tell a longtime patient he must remove part of his jaw due to a fast-growing cancer. Meanwhile, Dell copes with the absence of his daughter after his ex moves for a new job, and Sam and Addison find themselves suppressing their feelings for two very unattainable people.
29	20	"Do the Right Thing"	Eric Stoltz	Craig Turk	March 26, 2009	10.12
Cooper struggles with a patient's mother, who is allowing her 12-year-old daughter to be sexually active. Naomi worries about Dell's nonchalant attitude toward work after his ex takes Betsy away. Meanwhile Pete begins dating his patient's fun and outgoing mom, causing a bit of jealousy in Violet; Sam has to take the stand during a malpractice trial for a colleague, and Addison continues to fight her feelings for a very persistent Noah.
30	21	"What You Do For Love"	Tom Verica	Ayanna A. Floyd	April 23, 2009	9.08
When a pregnant woman starts to show signs of heart complications, Addison rushes her to St. Ambrose where Noah is standing by to help. Meanwhile at Oceanside Wellness, Sam notices Naomi frequently sneaking away from the clinic, and her elusiveness causes him to rethink their friendship; Pete's relationship with Lisa (Idina Menzel) becomes complicated by Violet's ever-present pregnancy; and Sheldon decides it's time to take a stand. Sam faces an ethical dilemma when he finds out his teacher patient is sleeping with a student, and things get worse when the student suffers an extreme allergic reaction to chlamydia medication.
31	22	"Yours, Mine and Ours"	Michael Zinberg	Jon Cowan & Robert Rovner	April 30, 2009	9.70
Violet chooses between Pete and Sheldon; Addison faces her feelings for Noah as Morgan goes into labor; Dell has concerns for his daughter when a drugged-out Heather returns to town; and Naomi must decide if it's in her best interest to stay with Oceanside Wellness or start anew at Pacific Wellcare. Violet refuses to answer Sheldon's proposal. A mistake which saw two patients receive the wrong fetal implant is discovered. Violet finds herself and her unborn child at the mercy of a grief stricken patient.

== Ratings ==
=== U.S. ===
#	Episode	Air Date	Timeslot (EST)	Rating	Share	18-49 (Rating/Share)	Viewers (m)	Weekly Rank (#)
1	"A Family Thing"	October 1, 2008	Wednesday; 9:00 P.M.	5.5	8	3.3/8	8.16	TBA
2	"Equal and Opposite"	October 8, 2008	Wednesday; 9:00 P.M.	5.1	8	2.6/7	7.4	TBA
3	"Nothing to Talk About"	October 22, 2008	Wednesday; 9:00 P.M.	5.5	8	3.0/8	7.98	46
4	"Past Tense"	October 29, 2008	Wednesday; 9:00 P.M.	5.3	8	2.9/7	7.93	52
5	"Let It Go"	November 5, 2008	Wednesday; 9:00 P.M.	6.2	9	3.2/8	9.54	30
6	"Serving Two Masters"	November 19, 2008	Wednesday; 9:00 P.M.	5.0	8	2.4/6	7.14	50
7	"Tempting Faith"	November 26, 2008	Wednesday; 9:00 P.M.	4.2	7	1.8/6	6.334	TBA
8	"Crime And Punishment"	December 3, 2008	Wednesday; 9:00 P.M.	5.4	8	2.5/7	7.782	46
9	"Know When To Fold"	December 10, 2008	Wednesday; 9:00 P.M.	4.9	8	2.4/6	6.859	44
10	"Worlds Apart"	December 17, 2008	Wednesday; 9:00 P.M.	4.6	7	2.3/6	6.61	37
11	"Contamination"	January 8, 2009	Thursday; 10:00 P.M.	6.0	10	3.3/8	8.977	29
12	"Homeward Bound"	January 15, 2009	Thursday; 10:00 P.M.	5.8	9	3.3/8	8.494	TBA
13	"Nothing to Fear"	January 22, 2009	Thursday; 10:00 P.M.	6.3	11	3.6/10	9.487	19
14	"Second Chances"	January 29, 2009	Thursday; 10:00 P.M.	5.4	9	2.8/8	7.735	32
15	"Acceptance"	February 5, 2009	Thursday; 10:00 P.M.	8.3	14	5.3/14	12.91	13
16	"Ex-Life"	February 12, 2009	Thursday; 10:00 P.M.	8.9	15	5.7/15	14.097	4
17	"Wait and See"	February 19, 2009	Thursday; 10:00 P.M.	7.3	12	4.4/12	11.157	17
18	"Finishing"	March 12, 2009	Thursday; 10:00 P.M.	5.9	10	3.3/9	8.804	TBA
19	"What Women Want"	March 19, 2009	Thursday; 10:00 P.M.	6.8	12	3.5/9	9.736	19
20	"Do the Right Thing"	March 26, 2009	Thursday; 10:00 P.M.	6.8	11	3.6/10	10.123	18
21	"What You Do For Love"	April 23, 2009	Thursday; 10:00 P.M.	6.2	11	3.3/9	9.084	25
22	"Yours, Mine and Ours"	April 30, 2009	Thursday; 10:00 P.M.	6.7	11	3.5/10	9.702	26

=== United Kingdom ===
In the second season, Private Practice aired on Thursdays at 9pm (then 10pm) on Living, with the episode airing again (which aired that night) on Living+1 an hour later and on Living+2 two hours later. Repeats on Sky Living Loves Weekdays 8am (then 2pm)

#	Title	Timeslot	Air date	Viewers (000s) Living/+1/+2	Weekly Rank (#)
2-01 (10)	A Family Thing	Thursday 9.00 P.M.	June 25, 2009	351	#7
2-02 (11)	Equal and Opposite	Thursday 9.00 P.M.	July 2, 2009	373	#5
2-03 (12)	Nothing to Talk About	Thursday 9.00 P.M.	July 9, 2009	339	#8
2-04 (13)	Past Tense	Thursday 9.00 P.M.	July 16, 2009	344	#5
2-05 (14)	Let It Go	Thursday 10.00 P.M.	July 23, 2009	319	#5
2-06 (15)	Serving Two Masters	Thursday 10.00 P.M.	July 30, 2009	344	#5
2-07 (16)	Tempting Faith	Thursday 10.00 P.M.	August 6, 2009	333	#5
2-08 (17)	Crime and Punishment	Thursday 10.00 P.M.	August 13, 2009	361	#4
2-09 (18)	Know When To Fold	Thursday 10.00 P.M.	August 20, 2009	390	#4
2-10 (19)	Worlds Apart	Thursday 10.00 P.M.	August 27, 2009	381	#4
2-11 (20)	Contamination	Thursday 10.00 P.M.	September 3, 2009	326	#4
2-12 (21)	Homeward Bound	Thursday 10.00 P.M.	September 10, 2009	398	#4
2-13 (22)	Nothing to Fear	Thursday 10.00 P.M.	September 17, 2009	302	#4
2-14 (23)	Second Chances	Thursday 10.00 P.M.	September 24, 2009	321	#5
2-15 (24)	Acceptance	Thursday 10.00 P.M.	October 1, 2009	387	#4
2-16 (25)	Ex-Life	Thursday 10.00 P.M.	October 8, 2009	378	#4
2-17 (26)	Wait and See	Thursday 10.00 P.M.	October 15, 2009	335	#4
2-18 (27)	Finishing	Thursday 10.00 P.M.	October 22, 2009	359	#6
2-19 (28)	What Women Want	Thursday 10.00 P.M.	November 5, 2009	353	#6
2-20 (29)	Do the Right Thing	Thursday 10.00 P.M.	November 12, 2009	360	#3
2-21 (30)	What You Do For Love	Thursday 10.00 P.M.	November 19, 2009	320	#3
2-22 (31)	Yours, Mine and Ours	Thursday 10.00 P.M.	November 26, 2009	361	#3

== DVD release ==
Private Practice: The Complete Second Season
Set Details
Special Features
- 22 Episodes (2 extended episodes)
- 6-Disc Set
- English (Dolby Digital 5.1 Surround)
- English SDH, Spanish & French subtitles
- Audio Commentaries
- Runtime: 974 minutes
- 2 Extended Episodes:
  - "Crime and Punishment"
  - "Nothing to Fear"
- Deleted Scenes
- Audio commentaries by creator/executive producer Shonda Rhimes and executive producer Betsy Beers on several deleted scenes
- Bloopers
- Patient Confidentiality: Examining Season 2
- Life Through the Lens: The Pictures of Chris Lowell
- Private Practice: Starter Kit - Season 1 recap
Release Dates
Region 1
Region 2
September 15, 2009
March 1, 2010
