= Private Practice season 3 =

Private Practice
- Season 3
- DVD cover art
- Starring: Kate Walsh; Tim Daly; Audra McDonald; Paul Adelstein; KaDee Strickland; Chris Lowell; Taye Diggs; Amy Brenneman
- No. of episodes: 23

Release
- Original network: ABC
- Original release: October 1, 2009 – May 13, 2010

Season chronology
- ← Previous; Season 2 Next → Season 4

The third season of Private Practice premiered on October 1, 2009, and concluded on May 13, 2010. The season consisted of 23 episodes.

== Plot ==
In the third season, Violet survives from the cliffhanger from season two thanks to Pete, Naomi and Addison. She gives Pete their baby, Lucas, while she recovers from the ordeal. Addison and Sam get even closer and develop feelings for each other, but decide not to become a couple because they don't want to hurt Naomi. Charlotte and Cooper break up, and Dell loses Heather in an explosion which nearly kills Betsey also.

Sam and Naomi's daughter, Maya, gets pregnant and marries the father of her baby, Dink. Addison and Pete become a couple, which causes Addison to get close to Lucas until Violet wants him back, even going as far as taking Pete to court to get joint custody. Sheldon starts to fall for Charlotte after they start to sleep together.

In the season finale, Addison and Sam finally get together while Charlotte and Cooper get engaged much to Sheldon's dismay. Pete and Violet work over their issues, while Dell and Maya get involved in a car accident and the severity of Dell's condition is overlooked. Dr. Amelia Shepherd, younger sister of Derek Shepherd (Addison's ex-husband) operated on him, having just arrived in town. She was unable to resuscitate him following heart failure. Maya survived her operation to save her spinal cord and prevent paralysis while at the same time she gives birth to a girl, who also survives the ordeal.

== Cast and characters ==
=== Main cast ===
- Kate Walsh as Addison Montgomery
- Tim Daly as Pete Wilder
- Audra McDonald as Naomi Bennett
- Paul Adelstein as Cooper Freedman
- KaDee Strickland as Charlotte King
- Chris Lowell as Dell Parker
- Taye Diggs as Sam Bennett
- Amy Brenneman as Violet Turner

=== Also starring ===
- Brian Benben as Sheldon Wallace

=== Recurring cast ===
- Geffri Maya as Maya Bennett
- Hailey Sole as Betsey Parker
- James Morrison as William White, Ryan Leitsch
- Amanda Detmer as Morgan Barnes
- Agnes Bruckner as Heather
- Amanda Foreman as Katie Kent
- Michael Patrick Thornton as Gabriel Fife
- Christina Chang as Vanessa Hoyt
- Stephen Lunsford as Filmore "Dink" Davis
- Stephen Collins as "The Captain" Montgomery
- Caterina Scorsone as Amelia Shepherd
- Sean Bridgers as Frank

=== Special guest stars ===
- Chandra Wilson as Miranda Bailey
- Eric Dane as Mark Sloan

=== Guest stars ===
- JoBeth Williams as Bizzy Montgomery
- Rosanna Arquette as Corinne, Dink's mother

== Episodes ==
List of Private Practice season 3 episodes
No. overall	No. in season	Title	Directed by	Written by	Original release date	US viewers (millions)
32	1	"A Death in the Family"	Mark Tinker	Shonda Rhimes, Jon Cowan & Robert Rovner	October 1, 2009	11.58
Pete comes home to find Violet on the floor bleeding to death, from Katie attacking her, and that the baby is gone, moments later Naomi arrives and they both call an ambulance and race to save her life. At the hospital everyone begins wondering where the baby is, as Cooper begins getting paged to pediatrics for a newborn baby. Addison begins surgery on Violet, only to find that the only way to save her life might be to perform a hysterectomy making it impossible for her to have a child. As all of the doctors at Oceanside Wellness worry for Violet, Cooper goes to pediatrics only to find that Katie has come to the hospital with Violet's baby, immediately getting the baby away from her making sure that the baby is safe. When Cooper presents the baby to Addison she finds that he also needs surgery, and has to leave Naomi in surgery with Violet in order to save both of their lives; Violet and the baby make it through their surgeries after Addison and Naomi are able to save their lives.
33	2	"The Way We Were"	Donna Deitch	Patti Carr & Lara Olsen	October 8, 2009	9.50
It's been one month since the events of the previous episode, and Violet is physically recovering from her violent attack at home, but the emotional trauma she suffers from isn't going away, despite the best efforts of Pete and her other friends to help. Addison and Naomi try to mend their tension-filled relationship. Cooper is surprised when he learns a family, whose daughter is one of his patients, have been involved in a violent domestic row---and more surprised when he learns who stabbed whom.
34	3	"Right Here, Right Now"	Rob Corn	Dana Baratta	October 15, 2009	10.36
Miranda Bailey (Grey's Anatomy's Chandra Wilson) brings Izzie Stevens (Katherine Heigl)'s kidney patient, Sarah Freemont (Alexie Gilmore) to Los Angeles, but she comes into conflict with Sam when the only possible donor is Sarah's HIV-positive sister, Emily (Joey Honsa). Meanwhile the consequences of Addison's emotional affair with Noah catch up with her. As Violet returns to work for the first time since her attack, Sheldon and Pete finally discover who the father of her baby is. Cooper and Pete try and help their patient attend his school dance with his girlfriend and share their first kiss. This episode concludes a patient crossover which began on Grey's Anatomy with the sixth season episode "Invasion". Chandra Wilson and patient guest star, Alexie Gilmore appear in both parts as Miranda Bailey and Sarah Freemont respectively.
35	4	"Pushing the Limits"	Allison Liddi-Brown	Ayanna A. Floyd	October 22, 2009	9.93
Addison, Sam and Cooper treat the sick child of a homeless teen mother they met while volunteering. Violet has trouble relating to her baby when her feelings about her attack resurface during counseling of a rape victim who is now pregnant. Cooper's financial woes catch up with him when he's asked to help buy out Naomi's share of the practice. After learning he's not the father of Violet's baby, Sheldon becomes jealous of Pete's friendship with Naomi. Dell has to deal with a patient who's paranoid that her baby is due.
36	5	"Strange Bedfellows"	Steve Gomer	Kathy McCormick	October 29, 2009	9.16
Katie Kent is on trial for what she did to Violet. Violet is asked to testify against her attacker, but she struggles with whether or not she can face her attacker in court. Meanwhile a serious complication threatens the fetuses of two of Naomi's former patients and Charlotte is determined to convince Addison, Sam and Cooper to let her join Oceanside Wellness Group.
37	6	"Slip Slidin' Away"	Helen Shaver	Fred Einesman	November 5, 2009	9.11
The doctors venture into controversial territory when an unexpected new hire at Pacific Wellcare causes Naomi to struggle with the idea of genetically designing babies and Violet makes a sudden decision to try electric shock therapy on a patient. Addison somehow finds herself alone and with a cat. Charlotte begins losing confidence in herself as she fails to attract patients.
38	7	"The Hard Part"	Mark Tinker	Steve Blackman	November 12, 2009	10.25
Addison and Sam go for a hike in Malibu, and must perform urgent field care when they stumble upon an expecting couple, trapped in their car after an accident. After the terrifying ordeal the two share an intimate moment. Meanwhile at Oceanside Wellness, Charlotte, Cooper and Violet treat a newlywed who, out of nervousness for his wedding night, has taken too much Viagra. Pete and Sheldon hit the bar scene together but fall for the same girl.
39	8	"Sins of the Father"	Tom Verica	Elizabeth J. B. Klaviter	November 19, 2009	8.93
Addison is shaken by the unwelcome arrival of her father (Stephen Collins) to Los Angeles, Cooper is arrested when he refuses to cooperate in a case involving a longtime patient, and his relationship with Charlotte is on the rocks after she confesses that she was once married. Pete fights to keep a terminally ill patient alive long enough for him to meet his new daughter. Dell surprises everyone when he announces that he's married Heather.
40	9	"The Parent Trap"	Donna Deitch	Craig Turk	December 3, 2009	9.21
Part one of a two-hour episode. Addison performs a complex in utero surgery, proving not only her talents to her father but also finally giving them some common ground. Sam and Naomi deal with their own family crisis when they discover their daughter is growing up way too fast, and Violet does something which draws her into the difficult dynamics of Addison's family. Violet and Charlotte clash over who should be seeing a patient with sexual problems.
41	10	"Blowups"	Mark Tinker	Sonay Washington	December 3, 2009	9.21
Part two of a two-hour episode. A terrible explosion at Dell's house lands Betsey and Heather in the hospital, and everyone is pushed to the limit trying to save their lives. Tensions rise even higher between Addison and the Captain when her mother, Bizzy (JoBeth Williams), shows up. Dell and Pete argue violently over whether Dell should let recovering Betsey visit her gravely burned and injured mother once more, knowing Heather caused the explosion. Addison walks in on Bizzy kissing a woman, Susan, who's been Bizzy's personal assistant for 20 years. Addison struggles to come to terms with both her mother's lesbianism and the realization that the Captain is not quite the scoundrel Addison assumed him to be. Heather dies of her injuries, portending consequences for both Betsey and Dell.
42	11	"Another Second Chance"	Michael Zinberg	Krista Vernoff & Kathy McCormick	January 14, 2010	10.96
Desperate to help his pregnant daughter (Leven Rambin), Mark (Eric Dane) follows Addison back to Oceanside Wellness, and old feelings between the two begin to resurface. Dell and Naomi struggle to raise their children under the same roof. Violet and Cooper heatedly disagree on how to treat a patient and Cooper and Charlotte hit the breaking point in their relationship. This episode concludes a crossover with Grey's Anatomy that begins on "Blink".
43	12	"Best Laid Plans"	Bethany Rooney	Patti Carr & Lara Olsen	January 21, 2010	9.64
Sam and Naomi are stunned by a shocking announcement from Maya, and Naomi's irrational response leaves Sam to pick up the pieces. Pete challenges Fife on the best course of treatment for a patient with a cutting-edge bionic arm. Dell tries his best to accommodate a single mom who's determined to have a natural childbirth in spite of a multiple-day course of labor. Violet reaches out with compassion to a man at St. Ambrose who has just lost his wife. The hostility between Charlotte and Cooper continues to make life uncomfortable for both of them as they clean up the loose ends of their failed relationship.
44	13	"Shotgun"	Karen Gaviola	Jon Cowan & Robert Rovner	February 4, 2010	9.25
Addison and Cooper counsel a couple who must make an unthinkable choice: deciding which one of their ailing daughters to save with their newborn's cord blood. Sam meets Dink's mother, Corrine (Rosanna Arquette), and is dealt another blow when he finds out Dink's intent to marry Maya. Some of the doctors get together for an intervention to try and draw in a still-devastated and distant Naomi. Things heat up between Addison and Sam as they develop true feelings for each other, but Addison is determined not to hurt Naomi.
45	14	"Love Bites"	Matthew Penn	Dana Baratta	February 11, 2010	9.04
Sam convinces Violet to help plan Maya's wedding when Naomi refuses to take part. As tensions between Addison and Sam rise even as they work together to treat a suicidal patient, she turns to Pete for comfort. Cooper and Pete treat a teenage girl with a mysterious bite mark on her neck. William White expresses a romantic interest in Naomi. Cooper and Charlotte continue to be snarky with each other.
46	15	"Til Death Do Us Part"	Kenny Leon	Craig Turk	February 18, 2010	7.59
As Violet continues to help Sam with Maya's wedding, Naomi refuses to take part as she works with Addison and Pete to save the life of a 25-week-old premature baby. Meanwhile, Cooper suspects that Charlotte's new boyfriend is abusing pills. Meanwhile, Pete and Addison decide to become a couple, despite Addison being in love with Sam, and Pete still in love with Violet. They decide to keep it a secret from them, but Sam ends up finding out.
47	16	"Fear of Flying"	Mark Tinker	Ayanna A. Floyd	March 4, 2010	7.57
Things get too close for comfort when Addison, Pete and Sam must come together on a complicated case involving a dad-to-be who comes down with tuberculosis and threatens the future of his new family. Addison meets Sam's new girlfriend, Vanessa. Meanwhile, with Violet still gone on her Costa Rican escape with Cooper, Sheldon takes over helping one of her patients, Natasha, to get over her crippling fear of flying, and he asks Charlotte for advice. Cooper comes back from the Costa Rican trip early and finds himself in a "zen" state, but his zen soon disappears after walking in on Charlotte and Sheldon kissing. As Naomi continues to be wooed by William White, Fife confesses his own feelings for her.
48	17	"Triangles"	Tom Verica	Steve Blackman	March 11, 2010	7.66
When Addison's patient and the life of the three unborn babies she is carrying as a surrogate hang in the balance, Sam's new girlfriend, Vanessa, and Addison are sharply divided on the course of treatment. Cooper seeks Sheldon's help with a young patient, but their personal quarrels over Charlotte get in the way, and Naomi has a dilemma of her own between William and an unexpectedly charming Dr. Fife. Pete notices William struggling with a medical condition, but is forbidden from telling Naomi.
49	18	"Pulling the Plug"	Ann Kindberg	Kathy McCormick	March 25, 2010	8.71
A husband's decision to pull the plug on his pregnant wife is overruled by a judge, forcing the hospital to keep her on life support until the fetuses she is carrying as a surrogate are able to survive. Naomi feels betrayed after learning of Sam and Addison's feelings for one another, and she turns to Dr. Fife for support while William is away on business. And unable to cope with the tension, Addison takes the day off with Pete and Lucas, leaving one of her patients under the care of Dell, who suddenly has to deliver a baby out in the field without equipment.
50	19	"Eyes Wide Open"	Eric Stoltz	Jesse Zigelstein	April 1, 2010	7.82
When famed neurosurgeon Dr. Ginsberg and her team pay a visit to St. Ambrose to wake Kayla from her coma, Addison is shocked to see Amelia Shepherd - Derek's younger sister - on the team. After Dr. Ginsberg declares nothing can be done, Amelia causes strife among Addison, Sam and Pete when she claims she can save Kayla's life. Charlotte seeks Cooper's help with a sex education seminar for the elderly that only leads to more tension between the two, as they try to figure out how to work together. Pete has to deal with paperwork and Fife's arrogance after Naomi travels to Switzerland to be with William.
51	20	"Second Choices"	Jeff Bleckner	Patti Carr & Lara Olsen	April 22, 2010	7.49
After her open-ended escape to Costa Rica, Violet has finally returned home and to the practice. Everyone treads a little lightly around her, especially Pete and Addison who have mixed feelings about Violet's desire to reconnect with Lucas. Addison and Sam clash over the best way to treat a soldier, whose wife wants him to leave the military. Amelia butts into Sam's personal life, pointing out that he can mend hearts in the OR but can't seem to do that for himself; and Sheldon encourages Charlotte to reconcile with Cooper, while Cooper deals with a young patient who eats everything in sight.
52	21	"War"	Eric Stoltz	Elizabeth J. B. Klaviter & Sonay Washington	April 29, 2010	7.78
After Violet files for joint custody of Lucas, an embittered Pete voraciously fights back by hiring a tough attorney for the trial, forcing their friends and co-workers to choose sides and have their personal lives dragged onto the stand and into the public eye.
53	22	"In the Name of Love"	Mark Tinker	Fred Einesman	May 6, 2010	8.15
Naomi puts Fife in a conflicted position when she begs him to help William's advanced ALS with his still experimental treatment. Violet and Amelia treat a woman with a brain tumor who has to choose between life or quality of life, and Sheldon decides to officially throw his hat into the ring for Charlotte's affections. Meanwhile, Addison and Sam become concerned about how their pregnant patient is treated by her father, but they discover something much more shocking.
54	23	"The End of a Beautiful Friendship"	Jeannot Szwarc	Debora Cahn	May 13, 2010	9.28
Maya and her unborn baby are fighting for their lives on the operating table, and Addison, Amelia and Fife try everything humanly possible to save them. Dell---who was driving Maya and her baby to the hospital---appears at first to recover from his injuries, while Charlotte, Addison, and others assure him the accident wasn't his fault. Meanwhile, Sam operates on an incoming crash victim and later makes a grim discovery; Cooper makes an ill-timed but valiant effort with Charlotte, and the staff's world gets rocked by an unexpected death. Addison decides to end things with Pete, saying he needs to be with Violet. After some advice from Sheldon, Addison decides to follow her heart and be with Sam.

== Ratings ==
=== U.S. ===
#	Episode	Air Date	Timeslot (EST)	Rating	Share	18-49 (Rating/Share)	Viewers (m)	Weekly Rank (#)
1	"A Death in the Family"	October 1, 2009	Thursday; 10:00 P.M.	7.6	13	4.6/13	11.58	20
2	"The Way We Were"	October 8, 2009	Thursday; 10:00 P.M.	6.2	11	3.6/10	9.50	25
3	"Right Here, Right Now"	October 15, 2009	Thursday; 10:00 P.M.	6.8	12	3.8/11	10.36	21
4	"Pushing the Limits"	October 22, 2009	Thursday; 10:00 P.M.	6.7	11	3.7/10	9.928	28
5	"Strange Bedfellows"	October 29, 2009	Thursday; 10:00 P.M.	6.1	10	3.6/9	9.155	29
6	"Slip Slidin' Away"	November 5, 2009	Thursday; 10:00 P.M.	6.0	10	3.4/10	9.11	27
7	"The Hard Part"	November 12, 2009	Thursday; 10:00 P.M.	6.7	11	3.9/11	10.249	TBA
8	"Sins of the Father"	November 19, 2009	Thursday; 10:00 P.M.	6.0	10	3.1/9	8.926	TBA
9	"The Parent Trap"	December 3, 2009	Thursday; 10:00 P.M.	6.3	10	3.2/8	9.211	24
10	"Blowups"	December 3, 2009	Thursday; 10:00 P.M.	6.3	10	3.2/8	9.211	24
11	"Another Second Chance"	January 14, 2010	Thursday; 10:00 P.M.	7.1	12	4.2/12	10.963	TBA
12	"Best Laid Plans"	January 21, 2010	Thursday; 10:00 P.M.	6.6	11	3.6/10	9.637	TBA
13	"Shotgun"	February 4, 2010	Thursday; 10:00 P.M.	6.2	11	3.3/10	9.254	TBA
14	"Love Bites"	February 11, 2010	Thursday; 10:00 P.M.	6.1	10	3.1/9	9.036	26
15	"'Til Death Do Us Part"	February 18, 2010	Thursday; 10:00 P.M.	5.1	8	2.8/7	7.593	32
16	"Fear of Flying"	March 4, 2010	Thursday; 10:00 P.M.	5.2	9	2.7/8	7.572	36
17	"Triangles"	March 11, 2010	Thursday; 10:00 P.M.	5.3	9	2.8/8	7.656	TBA
18	"Pulling the Plug"	March 25, 2010	Thursday; 10:00 P.M.	5.8	10	2.9/8	8.705	TBA
19	"Eyes Wide Open"	April 1, 2010	Thursday; 10:00 P.M.	5.3	9	2.6/8	7.822	TBA
20	"Second Choices"	April 22, 2010	Thursday 9:00 P.M.	5.1	9	2.3/6	7.491	TBA
21	"War"	April 29, 2010	Thursday; 10:00 P.M.	5.4	9	2.9/9	7.775	TBA
22	"In the Name of Love"	May 6, 2010	Thursday; 10:00 P.M.	5.7	10	2.8/8	8.152	TBA
23	"The End of A Beautiful Friendship"	May 13, 2010	Thursday; 10:00 P.M.	6.3	11	3.2/9	9.299	TBA

=== United Kingdom ===
In the third season, Private Practice aired on Thursdays at 10pm on Living, with the episode airing again (which aired that night) on Living+1 an hour later. The season averaged 251,000 viewers, 29% less than the second season.

#	Title	Timeslot	Air date	LIVING		LIVING +1		Total (000s)
#	Title	Timeslot	Air date	Viewers^{a}	Rank^{b}	Viewers^{a}	Rank^{b}	Total (000s)
3-01 (32)	A Death in the Family	Thursday 10.00 P.M.	June 17, 2010	276	#7	—N/a	—N/a	276
3-02 (33)	The Way We Were	Thursday 10.00 P.M.	June 24, 2010	260	#7	—N/a	—N/a	260
3-03 (34)	Right Here, Right Now	Thursday 10.00 P.M.	July 1, 2010	270	#5	—N/a	—N/a	270
3-04 (35)	Pushing the Limits	Thursday 10.00 P.M.	July 8, 2010	218	#6	93	#8	309
3-05 (36)	Strange Bedfellows	Thursday 10.00 P.M.	July 15, 2010	224	#5	127	#6	351
3-06 (37)	Slip Slidin' Away	Thursday 10.00 P.M.	July 22, 2010	206	#7	125	#4	331
3-07 (38)	The Hard Part	Thursday 10.00 P.M.	July 29, 2010	234	#4	93	#8	327
3-08 (39)	Sins of the Father	Thursday 10.00 P.M.	August 5, 2010	260	#4	88	#10	348
3-09 (40)	The Parent Trap	Thursday 10.00 P.M.	August 12, 2010	229	#6	111	#3	340
3-10 (41)	Blowups	Thursday 10.00 P.M.	August 19, 2010	279	#4	—N/a	—N/a	279
3-11 (42)	Another Second Chance	Thursday 8.00 P.M.	August 26, 2010	182	#4	—N/a	—N/a	182
3-12 (43)	Best Laid Plans	Thursday 8.00 P.M.	September 2, 2010	235	#5	—N/a	—N/a	235
3-13 (44)	Shotgun	Thursday 8.00 P.M.	September 9, 2010	166	#5	90	#5	256
3-14 (45)	Love Bites	Thursday 8.00 P.M.	September 16, 2010	246	#3	70	#8	316
3-15 (46)	'Til Death Do Us Part	Thursday 8.00 P.M.	September 23, 2010	177	#7	—N/a	—N/a	177
3-16 (47)	Fear of Flying	Thursday 8.00 P.M.	September 30, 2010	203	#5	—N/a	—N/a	203
3-17 (48)	Triangles	Thursday 7.00 P.M.	October 7, 2010	129	#10	—N/a	—N/a	129
3-18 (49)	Pulling the Plug	Thursday 7.00 P.M.	October 14, 2010	—N/a	—N/a	88	#10	88
3-19 (50)	Eyes Wide Open	Thursday 7.00 P.M.	October 21, 2010	219	#7	—N/a	—N/a	219
3-20 (51)	Second Choices	Thursday 7.00 P.M.	October 28, 2010	211	#5	—N/a	—N/a	211
3-21 (52)	War	Thursday 7.00 P.M.	November 4, 2010	168	#7	—N/a	—N/a	168
3-22 (53)	In the Name of Love	Thursday 7.00 P.M.	November 11, 2010	197	#7	79	#7	276
3-23 (54)	The End of a Beautiful Friendship	Thursday 7.00 P.M.	November 18, 2010	218	#6	—N/a	—N/a	218

^{a} Viewers in thousands. ^{b} Ranks for specific channel only.

== DVD release ==
Private Practice: The Complete Third Season
Set Details		Special Features
23 Episodes; 5-Disc Set; English (Dolby Digital 5.1 Surround); English SDH, Spanish & French subtitles; Runtime: 991 minutes		Bloopers; Deleted Scenes; Kate's Top Eight - Kate Walsh shares her favorite moments from Season Three
Release Dates
Region 1	Region 2	Region 4
September 14, 2010	March 21, 2011	November 3, 2010
