= Dell Parker =

William Parker
- Private Practice & Grey's Anatomy character
- First appearance: Grey's Anatomy: "The Other Side of This Life (Part 1)" 3x22 Private Practice: "In Which We Meet Addison, a Nice Girl From Somewhere Else" 1x01
- Last appearance: Grey's Anatomy: "The Other Side of This Life (part 2)" 3x23 Private Practice: "The End of a Beautiful Friendship" 3x23
- Created by: Shonda Rhimes
- Portrayed by: Chris Lowell

In-universe information
- Alias: Dell
- Gender: Male
- Occupation: Midwife; Registered Nurse; Receptionist
- Spouse: Heather Parker (deceased)
- Children: Betsy Parker (daughter with Heather)
- Relatives: Wendell Parker (grandfather)

William Parker, more commonly known as Dell Parker, is a character on the Grey's Anatomy spin-off, Private Practice. He was portrayed by actor Chris Lowell and appeared from the first through third seasons. Dell was the receptionist at the Oceanside Wellness Group as well as a qualified nurse, training to be a mid-wife, helping out the doctors with various tasks. Dell was frequently shown to be concerned with the health of younger patients, which is likely related to his abuse as a child, as well as his own young daughter. The character died following injuries sustained in a car crash.

== Storylines ==
=== Season 1 ===
Dell was abused as a child by his mother, making it easy to relate to patients. He then became addicted to heroin and introduced his girlfriend Heather to his drug dealing friends, she became addicted too. Heather got pregnant with Dell's baby, Dell wanted an abortion but Heather didn't. Later in the show we find out that Dell's child Betsey (6-8yrs) is being raised by him, and Heather is no longer in her life but seems to come back time to time.

=== Season 2 ===
In the season two premiere, Dell tries to help Naomi hide the practice's budding financial struggles, under the pretenses of "going green," but does so without her knowledge. However, believing he wants to talk to her regarding his crush on her, Naomi continually ignores his pleas to discuss the matter, forcing Dell to concede and quit his job.

After leaving his job at the Oceanside Wellness Group, Dell works as a nurse at St. Ambrose Hospital. Upon learning this, Naomi tries to convince Dell to return to the practice without much luck. After a pep talk from Addison, Dell wishes to return to the practice as long as a list of demands are met, one of which states that he is to be exempt from wearing pink scrubs. Sam, the head of the practice at the time, refuses to rehire him. This forces Naomi to fight for his reinstatement to which Sam finally agrees.

Dell later ends up arguing with Addison, who has since become the head of the practice, over whether or not he should have his own office; but he eventually ends up setting one aside for himself without permission. However, Addison does not punish him and allows him to keep the office when it is revealed that he has a six-year-old daughter, Betsy, from an unsuccessful relationship with Heather when he was seventeen; and he was just trying to impress his daughter.

Dell enrolled as a student in the South Bay School of Holistic Midwifery and Family Nursing. He earned credit towards his degree in midwifery by assisting staff doctors with obstetrical exams and childbirths. Dell's hobbies included surfing during his lunch breaks.

When Heather gets a promotion at work, she talks to Dell, informing him the promotion is in St. Louis. Dell does not want this to happen, and they fight about it. Later on, when Dell goes to talk to her, he finds her apartment empty, and Betsy gone.

=== Season 3 ===
Dell married Heather, and most of the group at the practice did not approve of it. He later yelled at Violet and Naomi due to their opposition of his marriage.

One night when Dell was heading out for work, his home exploded. Betsy escapes with minor injuries, but Heather received third degree burns on her body. Later on, the explosion was revealed to have been caused by Heather cooking crystal meth on the stove. After this revelation, Dell was furious and told Heather to go die and suffer a miserable death for putting their daughter in danger, then proceeded to not allow Betsy see her mother. Later in the hospital that night, Heather died due to her injuries, never having the chance to say good-bye to Dell or Betsy.

Dell later befriended Naomi and Sam's daughter Maya, who had gotten pregnant and didn't have her mother's support. Dell supported Maya when she decided to marry Dink, the father of her baby, and later helped them out during her pregnancy. When Maya goes into labor, she calls Dell who picks her up and drives her to the hospital. They are involved in a car crash and Maya is in a critical state, as well as her baby. With everything going on with Maya and the baby, nobody checks on Dell, who suddenly passes out and is revealed to have an initially undetected brain hemorrhage. Naomi will not let Amelia out of Maya's spinal surgery to fix Dell, and Charlotte and Amelia eventually operate on him, but during surgery he goes into cardiac arrest and Charlotte and Amelia were not able to resuscitate him on the table.
