= Private Practice season 1 =

Private Practice
- Season 1
- ABC promotional poster for the first season of Private Practice.
- Starring: Kate Walsh; Tim Daly; Audra McDonald; Paul Adelstein; KaDee Strickland; Chris Lowell; Taye Diggs; Amy Brenneman
- No. of episodes: 9

Release
- Original network: ABC
- Original release: September 26 – December 5, 2007

Season chronology
- Next → Season 2

The first season of Private Practice, an American television series created by Shonda Rhimes, consisted of nine episodes that ran from September 26 to December 5, 2007. A spin-off of Grey's Anatomy, the series tells the story of Addison Montgomery, a world-class neonatal surgeon, as she adjusts to her move from Seattle to Los Angeles and a new job at Oceanside Wellness Group, a private medical practice. The episodes also focus on the interpersonal relationships among Addison's co-workers, Naomi Bennett, Sam Bennett, Cooper Freedman, Dell Parker, Violet Turner and Pete Wilder, as well as St. Ambrose Hospital chief of staff Charlotte King.

Private Practice's first season aired in the United States on Wednesdays at 9:00 pm ET on ABC, a terrestrial television network. The season garnered an average of 10.76 million viewers per episode during the 2008–09 American television season. In the United Kingdom, the season premiered on Living on July 15, 2008, and was subsequently shown on Tuesdays at 10:00 pm. It aired in Canada on CTV Television Network and in Australia on the Seven Network. It received generally negative reviews from television critics on its debut, but was nominated for three NAACP Image Awards and one People's Choice Award, and earned one BMI Film & TV Award.

The season was released on DVD as a three-disc box set under the title of Private Practice: The Complete First Season – Extended Edition, on September 16, 2008, by Buena Vista Home Entertainment in Region 1 and on March 16, 2009, in Region 2. The season is also available for purchase by registered users at the U.S. iTunes Store, as well as numerous streaming video on demand services.

== Episodes ==
List of Private Practice season 1 episodes
No. overall	No. in season	Title	Directed by	Written by	Original release date	US viewers (millions)
1	1	"In Which We Meet Addison, a Nice Girl From Somewhere Else"	Mark Tinker	Shonda Rhimes	September 26, 2007	14.41
Addison Montgomery resigns from Seattle Grace Hospital to accept a position as a gynecologist at the Oceanside Wellness Center. During her first day of work, her six co-workers (and main characters) Naomi Bennett, Sam Bennett, Violet Turner, Cooper Freedman, Dell Parker, and Pete Wilder, are introduced. Addison has difficulty adjusting to her new work environment on discovering Naomi did not tell anyone that she had been hired, and learning she will handle a lower number of patients than expected. All of the doctors deal with individual patients, while trying to resolve problems in their personal lives. Addison and Dell help a pregnant teenager with a difficult childbirth, Violet consoles her patient in the middle of a nervous breakdown in a store, and Naomi and Sam discuss whether they should fulfill a woman's wish to extract her dead boyfriend's semen and impregnate her with it. At the end of the day, Addison delivers a speech to her co-workers, announcing that she will be staying at the practice.
2	2	"In Which Sam Receives an Unexpected Visitor"	Tony Goldwyn	Mike Ostrowski	October 3, 2007	12.45
Cooper hires a stripper for Sam to help him adjust to his new single life. Naomi becomes upset with Sam when the stripper is admitted to the practice as a patient. After performing genetic testing on a clients' baby, Cooper, Addison, and Naomi discover that the child was switched at birth. The doctors collaborate with Charlotte King to determine the identity of the person who switched the babies and the location of the clients' real child. Charlotte and Addison clash over the best way to handle the situation. The mothers meet and bond over their love for the children, with the babies being returned to their biological parents. Cooper consults a patient who becomes extremely sick whenever he drinks alcohol. Violet attempts to deal with her continued feelings for her ex-boyfriend.
3	3	"In Which Addison Finds the Magic"	Mark Tinker	Shonda Rhimes & Marti Noxon	October 10, 2007	12.42
Addison and Pete treat newlyweds who are experiencing sexual problems. Addison diagnoses the wife with vulvar vestibulitis, and Pete treats her through alternative medicine. Cooper attempts to find out why his patient and her three siblings are all displaying signs of ammonium nitrate poisoning. Through a home visit, Cooper realizes that the children were playing in a shed containing bags of fertilizer. Violet tries to convince her patient to leave his wife, but he stays with her after she is diagnosed with granulomatosis with polyangiitis (referred to by the former Nazi eponym for the disease "Wegener's granulomatosis"). Naomi is distraught when Maya chooses to spend the week with Sam. Dell attempts to comfort Naomi by bringing in freshly-baked cakes every day. Pete honors the anniversary of his wife's death.
4	4	"In Which Addison Has a Very Casual Get Together"	Arvin Brown	Andrea Newman	October 17, 2007	11.78
Addison feels offended when none of her co-workers have responded to her invitation to a party. Sam makes his first talk show appearance to promote his latest self-help book. Cooper counsels a young, lovesick patient and makes a pact that they both reveal their crushes to their friends. However, the boy is beaten up for revealing he is gay and Cooper consoles him. Violet is caught off guard when her ex-boyfriend's new wife admits herself as a patient and is diagnosed with a bladder infection from having too much sex. Addison agrees to help a psychiatric patient, who everyone believes has Munchausen syndrome, and finds out that she in fact has Crohn's disease. Pete tries to treat an elderly man who keeps falling asleep unexpectedly, but he faces issues as the man doesn't believe in his kind of treatment. When Addison tells her co-workers about her frustration over the party, they tell her that they had always planned on going to it.
5	5	"In Which Addison Finds a Showerhead"	Julie Anne Robinson	Shonda Rhimes & Marti Noxon	October 24, 2007	11.91
Addison experiences frequent sexual dreams about Pete that leave her in a constant state of arousal, leading to Naomi and Violet suggesting that she masturbate using a shower head. Naomi's daughter Maya approaches Addison and tells her that she may have an STD and asks her not to notify her mother. However, it is revealed that Maya was asking to help her friend Ruby, who is found bleeding on the kitchen floor. Naomi is angry at Addison and Maya for keeping information from her, and Addison suggests that Naomi talk to her daughter about sex. Pete and Charlotte attempt to help an athlete, but her refusal to follow their orders leaves her physically unable to race again. Violet and Sam help a woman who is considering undergoing drug-induced amnesia to remove traumatic memories of a home invasion. Despite Cooper's insistence, Violet attempts to become friends with her ex-boyfriend. Dell performs his first Pap smear on a patient after several failed attempts. Addison decides to use her shower head after imagining Pete as a cowboy and a gladiator.
6	6	"In Which Charlotte Goes Down the Rabbit Hole"	David Solomon	Jenna Bans	October 31, 2007	10.34
Charlotte seeks help from Oceanside Wellness, saying that she has not been able to sleep for more than three hours over the last three days. She is sent to Pete after refusing a sleep aid from Sam. Following several failed attempts, Charlotte finally sleeps after talking to Pete about her family's lack of intimacy and affection. Addison and Naomi consult a couple who plan on having a child; the wife, Angie Paget, tells them in private that she does not want children as she believes that she has the gene for Huntington's disease. Angie is tested positive for the gene and tells her husband about her family's history with the disease. They both decide to continue working with Addison and Naomi so they can raise a child before Angie gets the disease. Cooper discovers that his patient is being physically abused by her mother, who suffers from multiple sclerosis. Sam becomes concerned and angry when Dell develops a crush on Naomi.
7	7	"In Which Sam Gets Taken For a Ride"	Jeff Melman	Emily Halpern	November 14, 2007	11.48
While answering a house call, Sam gets caught in a hostage situation at a convenience store and is held at gunpoint by a pregnant woman named Kelly. When Kelly goes into labor, Sam helps her to deliver her baby and persuades her to let him call the police. When Sam returns to the practice, he and Naomi reignite their passion and have sex. Violet and Cooper agree to start a friends with benefits relationship, but Cooper advises against it due to his romantic feelings for her. Meanwhile, Pete and Addison decide to pursue a casual relationship, while helping a woman deliver a baby after her boyfriend died. However, Pete ends up standing Addison up. Meanwhile, Addison attracts the attention of Kevin Nelson, the former police partner of her patient's dead boyfriend. Dell delivers his first baby, but he, Naomi and Violet have to help the mother accept her son after she rejects him because she wanted a daughter.
8	8	"In Which Cooper Finds a Port In His Storm"	Mark Tinker	Lauren Schmidt	November 21, 2007	8.54
Cooper discovers that he has been talking to Charlotte on an online dating website, and the two initiate a sexual relationship. Addison goes on a date with one of Violet's patients but is disturbed to learn about his shoe fetish after finding out that he stole one of her shoes and inserted it in his rectum. Naomi and Sam attempt to find the cause for a typhus outbreak in a convent while providing care for the affected nuns and priest. They discover that the priest is the carrier and spread typhus by sneaking into the nunnery. Addison and Pete help with a program involving the safe-haven law. She becomes attached to one of the babies, whom she names "Batgirl".
9	9	"In Which Dell Finds His Fight"	Wendey Stanzler	Ayanna Floyd	December 5, 2007	10.40
Dell suspects that his grandfather is being abused at his nursing home after noticing bruises on his body. Sam investigates the nursing home and discovers that Dell's grandfather is a part of a fight club run by the residents. Addison begins a romantic relationship with a police officer, Kevin Nelson, while attempting to maintain a friendship with Pete. Addison and Naomi are treating the couple from the third episode after they have difficulty in conceiving a child. Violet and Cooper discuss the changes in their friendship after Cooper avoids her to have a secret sexual relationship with Charlotte. Cooper and Pete participate in a program to prepare first-time fathers to care for their children. Sam and Naomi also have a secret relationship after having sex in previous episodes. Dell kisses Naomi and proclaims his feelings for her and his desire to fight for her.

== Production ==
=== Development ===
On February 21, 2007, Edward Wyatt of The New York Times reported that ABC was in the process of developing a spin-off series from the medical drama television series Grey's Anatomy. Even though network executives and series creator Shonda Rhimes did not confirm plans for Private Practice, Wyatt called it a "well-known secret" as information about the casting and production was becoming increasingly more available. The spin-off was officially confirmed through subsequent media commentators, who stated that the two-part episode "The Other Side of This Life" would serve as the backdoor pilot for the new series. Grey's Anatomy cast members Ellen Pompeo and Katherine Heigl had mixed reactions to the decision to create a spin-off for Kate Walsh's character Addison Montgomery. Today's Jeannette Walls reported that Pompeo was angry at not being consulted prior the show's creation. Heigl praised the concept for Private Practice but wished her character (Izzie Stevens) had been chosen for the spin-off instead.

The show was officially announced as part of ABC's 2007 fall television schedule on The Ellen DeGeneres Show. The season was produced by ABC Studios, the Mark Gordon Company, and ShondaLand. The executive producers were Rhimes, Betsy Beers, Marti Noxon, Mark Gordon, and Mark Tinker; Rhimes also served as the show's cinematographer. Production began on July 18, 2007, in Los Angeles. The series' theme and score were composed by Chad Fischer and Tim Bright.

=== Casting ===
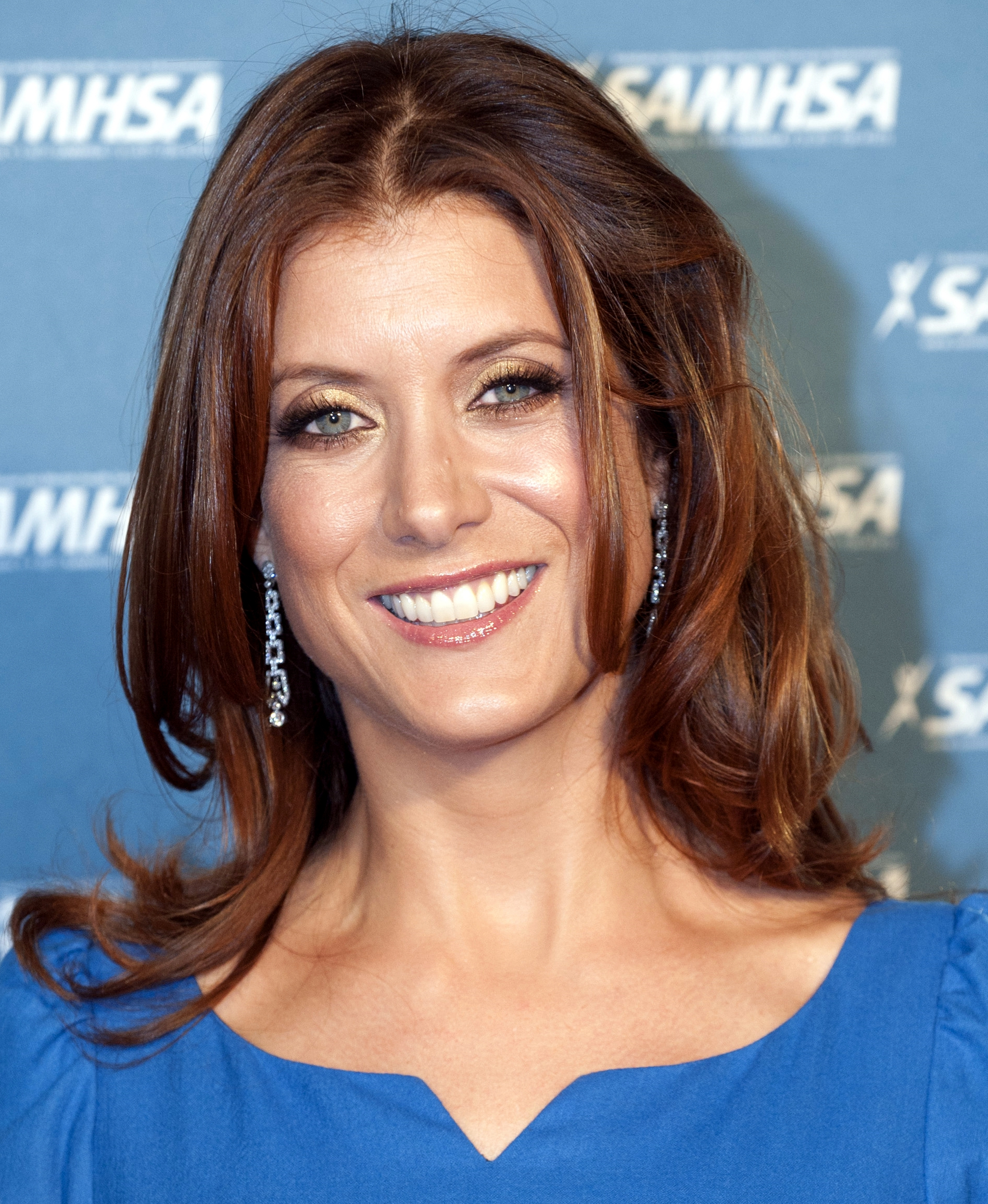
The series was created to focus on Kate Walsh's character.

The first season features a cast of eight actors who receive star billing. Kate Walsh stars as Dr. Addison Montgomery, a neonatologist who moved to Santa Monica in order to reinvent herself. Audra McDonald and Taye Diggs play the respective characters of fertility specialist Dr. Naomi Bennett and health guru Dr. Sam Bennett, Addison's divorcee college friends. The role of Naomi was originally played by Merrin Dungey in the backdoor pilot. According to a writer from Variety, network executives replaced her with McDonald due to concerns over the lack of chemistry between Dungey and Diggs. The recasting did not result in reshooting any of the pilot's previous scenes. Amy Brenneman is Dr. Violet Turner, a therapist who constantly doubts herself. Paul Adelstein portrays pediatrician Dr. Cooper Freedman, who is a sex addict. Tim Daly plays the seductive alternative medicine specialist, Dr. Pete Wilder, and Chris Lowell is the receptionist Dell Parker, who frequently appears shirtless in the office.

KaDee Strickland portrays Dr. Charlotte King, who also works as a hospital administrator. Strickland's character was introduced in the first season and did not make an appearance in the backdoor pilot. Her addition to the main cast was announced on July 11, 2007, prior to the commencement of the first season. Strickland did not have to audition for the role, but was cast after a meeting with Rhimes.

Numerous supporting characters have been given expansive and recurring appearances in the progressive storylines. David Sutcliffe plays police officer Kevin Nelson, who was introduced as a love interest of Addison. Sutcliffe later appeared in 11 episodes in the second season. Geffri Maya Hightower plays Naomi and Sam's daughter, Maya Bennett. Hightower would return for future seasons, and was included in 30 episodes over the course of the series. James Pickens Jr. portrays Dr. Richard Webber, as a special guest star, appearing in the teaser sequence for the first episode.

== Reception ==
=== Viewing figures ===
The pilot episode, which aired on September 26, 2007, garnered 14.1 million viewers, ranking number 13 in its time slot of Wednesdays at 9:00 pm Eastern Time Zone (ET). ABC picked up the series for a full 22-episode season on October 18, 2007, after it had aired four episodes. At the time of its renewal, Private Practice was the most-watched new drama of the 2007 television season. The first season was shortened due to the 2007–08 Writers Guild of America strike. Overall, it averaged 10.76 million viewers for the nine episodes aired in the U.S., with the pilot being the highest rated episode. Of the regular prime time programming that aired during the 2007–08 American television season, Private Practice ranked 36 out of 225 programs, according to the Nielsen ratings.

=== Critical response ===
Private Practice received generally negative critical reviews when it was first broadcast. On the review aggregator website Metacritic, the first season scored 45 out of 100, based on 25 reviews, indicating "mixed to average" responses. The series was called "shallow and smirky" by The Washington Post's Tom Shales, who felt the dialogue and storylines relied too much on sexual humor; he thought the first season would not appeal to Grey's Anatomy fans. David Hinckley of the New York Daily News was critical of the pilot's opening sequences, finding they represented the show too much as a sitcom, but felt that it found its footing as the episode progressed and more emphasis was placed on "the more nuanced personal and professional sides of its characters". David Zurawik of The Baltimore Sun praised Brenneman and McDonald's performances, but was disappointed in the series premiere.

Some critics commented negatively on the characters and the show's representation of women. The series was described as an improvement over the backdoor pilot by USA Today's Robert Blanco, but he criticized the doctors' characters as childish and seemingly incapable of doing their jobs. Blanco viewed the show as a misstep in Addison's character development, writing that she is "a woman who was once a tough, smart, flawed, sexy adult [who] has turned into a fluttering, indecisive sorority girl". Alessandra Stanley of The New York Times was critical of the show's interpretation of feminism, describing the characters as "one of the most depressing portrayals of the female condition since The Bell Jar", and reminiscent of the "seven stages of womanly despair" in William Hogarth's engraving A Surgeon's Progress. Dough Elfman of the Chicago Sun-Times wrote that the actors were better than the show's premise and writing, and The Boston Globe's Matthew Gilbert described the characters as a "stock cast of whiney healers" and the storylines as "hokey, gimmicky medical cases of the week".

=== Awards and nominations ===
The first season of Private Practice was nominated for three NAACP Image Awards—Outstanding Supporting Actor in a Drama Series (Diggs), Outstanding Supporting Actress in a Drama Series (McDonald), and Outstanding Writing in a Drama Series (Rhimes) for the pilot. The series received a nomination for the People's Choice Award for Favorite New TV Drama. Chad Fischer and Tim Bright won the BMI TV Music Award at the BMI Film & TV Awards.

== DVD release ==
Private Practice: The Complete First Season – Extended Edition
Set details	Special features
Nine episodes (two extended episodes); Three-disc set; English (Dolby Digital 5.1 Surround); Subtitles: English SDH, Spanish & French; Audio commentaries; Runtime: 394 minutes	2 Extended Episodes - "In Which We Meet Addison, A Nice Girl From Somewhere Else" & "In Which Addison Finds the Magic"; Audio Commentaries on 3 Episodes: "In Which We Meet Addison, a Nice Girl From Somewhere Else" with Shonda Rhimes, Kate Walsh & Betsy Beers; "In Which Sam Gets Taken for a Ride" with Amy Brenneman & Paul Adelstein; "In Which Dell Finds His Fight" with Taye Diggs & Chris Lowell; Kate Walsh: Practice Makes Perfect; Alternative Ensemble: Behind the Scenes of Private Practice; Deleted scenes; Bloopers
Release dates
Region 1	Region 2
September 16, 2008	March 16, 2009
