= Private Practice (TV series) =

American television series (2007–2013)

- Genre: Medical drama
- Created by: Shonda Rhimes
- Showrunner: Steve Blackman
- Starring: Kate Walsh; Tim Daly; Audra McDonald; Paul Adelstein; KaDee Strickland; Chris Lowell; Taye Diggs; Amy Brenneman; Brian Benben; Caterina Scorsone; Benjamin Bratt; Griffin Gluck
- Theme music composer: Chad Fischer
- Composers: Chad Fischer; Timothy Bright
- Country of origin: United States
- Original language: English
- No. of seasons: 6
- No. of episodes: 111 (list of episodes)

Production
- Executive producers: Shonda Rhimes; Marti Noxon (seasons 1–2); Betsy Beers; Mark Gordon; Mark Tinker; Jon Cowan (seasons 2–3); Robert Rovner (seasons 2–3); Craig Turk (seasons 4–5); Steve Blackman (seasons 4–5); Mark Wilding (season 2); Barbie Klingman (season 6); Jennifer Cecil (season 6)
- Producers: Lauren Schmidt; Sanford Golden; Hans van Doornewaard; Ayanna Floyd; Scott Printz; Elizabeth Klaviter; Jenna Bans; Karen Wyscarver; Ann Kindberg; Christopher Fife
- Camera setup: Single-camera
- Running time: 43 minutes
- Production companies: Shondaland; The Mark Gordon Company; ABC Studios

Original release
- Network: ABC
- Release: September 26, 2007 – January 22, 2013

Related
- Grey's Anatomy; Merhaba Hayat

Private Practice is an American medical drama television series that aired on the American Broadcasting Company for six seasons from September 26, 2007, to January 22, 2013. A spin-off of Grey's Anatomy, the series takes place at Seaside Health & Wellness Center (formerly Oceanside Wellness Group) and chronicles the life of Dr. Addison Montgomery, played by Kate Walsh, as she leaves Seattle Grace Hospital in order to join a private practice, located in Los Angeles. Private Practice also revolves around Addison's co-workers at Seaside Health & Wellness Center, and how they deal with patients and the practice while still finding time to live their everyday lives.

The series was created by Shonda Rhimes, who also served as executive producer, alongside Betsy Beers, Mark Gordon, Mark Tinker, Craig Turk, and Steve Blackman, who served as showrunners due to Rhimes's duties on Grey's Anatomy.

On May 11, 2012, Private Practice was renewed for a sixth season. The sixth season was the only one not to feature Tim Daly and was announced on October 19, 2012, to be the final season. The series finale aired on January 22, 2013. Reruns can be seen in syndication on some local ABC stations and can be streamed on Hulu and Disney Plus.

== Series overview ==
Private Practice series overview
Season	Episodes	Originally released		Average US viewership (in millions)
Season	Episodes	First released	Last released	Average US viewership (in millions)
Pilot	2	May 3, 2007		21.23
1	9	September 26, 2007	December 5, 2007	11.53 (Note: Multiple references; for the first season, see: Episode 1: Episode 2: Episode 3: Episode 4: Episode 5: Episode 6: Episode 7: Episode 8: Episode 9:)
2	22	October 1, 2008	April 30, 2009	8.89 (Note: Multiple references; for the second season, see: Episode 1: Episode 2: Episode 3: Episode 4: Episode 5: Episode 6: Episode 7: Episode 8: Episode 9: Episode 10: Episode 11: Episode 12: Episode 13: Episode 14: Episode 15: Episode 16: Episode 17: Episode 18: Episode 19: Episode 20: Episode 21: Episode 22:)
3	23	October 1, 2009	May 13, 2010	9.05 (Note: Multiple references; for the third season, see: Episode 1: Episode 2: Episode 3: Episode 4: Episode 5: Episode 6: Episode 7: Episode 8: Episodes 9 and 10: Episode 11: Episode 12: Episode 13: Episode 14: Episode 15: Episode 16: Episode 17: Episode 18: Episode 19: Episode 20: Episode 21: Episode 22: Episode 23:)
4	22	September 23, 2010	May 19, 2011	7.59 (Note: Multiple references; for the fourth season, see: Episode 1: Episode 2: Episode 3: Episode 4: Episode 5: Episode 6: Episode 7: Episode 8: Episode 9: Episode 10: Episode 11: Episode 12: Episode 13: Episode 14: Episode 15: Episode 16: Episode 17: Episode 18: Episode 19: Episode 20: Episode 21: Episode 22:)
5	22	September 29, 2011	May 15, 2012	6.86 (Note: Multiple references; for the fifth season, see: Episode 1: Episode 2: Episode 3: Episode 4: Episode 5: Episode 6: Episode 7: Episodes 8 and 9: Episode 10: Episode 11: Episode 12: Episode 13: Episode 14: Episode 15: Episode 16: Episode 17: Episode 18: Episode 19: Episode 20: Episode 21: Episode 22:)
6	13	September 25, 2012	January 22, 2013	4.64 (Note: Multiple references; for the sixth season, see: Episode 1: Episode 2: Episode 3: Episode 4: Episode 5: Episode 6: Episode 7: Episode 8: Episode 9: Episode 10: Episode 11: Episode 12: Episode 13:)

=== Season 1 (2007) ===
The first season deals with Addison's move from Seattle to Los Angeles and her attempts to adjust to a very different type of working environment at Oceanside Wellness Group, a co-op private practice. The first season also deals with her budding relationships with her new co-workers. Among them are her best friend Naomi Bennett, a fertility specialist, and Naomi's ex-husband Sam Bennett, who specializes in internal medicine. Also working within the practice is psychiatrist Violet Turner, pediatrician Cooper Freedman, alternative medicine specialist Pete Wilder, and receptionist Dell Parker. It is revealed early on that the Bennetts established the practice with the rest of the doctors owning a share of it as well. Charlotte King, who serves as chief of staff at St. Ambrose Hospital, works with Oceanside Wellness through her dealings with Sam and her sexual relationship with Cooper.

=== Season 2 (2008–2009) ===
The second season begins with the practice dealing with financial troubles. Naomi reveals to Addison that they are in danger of losing the practice due to unpaid debt, causing Addison to tell Sam. This in turn causes a shift within the practice, whereby Sam and Naomi decide the new boss will be determined by a vote among the members of the practice, resulting in the highest vote getter, Addison, taking over. More tension is added when a new practice on the fourth floor, Pacific Wellcare, competes for patients. This new practice, run by Charlotte, is causing turmoil for her and Cooper. Also in this season, Sam and Naomi finally realize they can no longer be friends, and the romantic relationship of Cooper and Charlotte deepens. Addison was romantically linked with Kevin Nelson (played by David Sutcliffe), a police officer, but later realized their relationship was going nowhere. Towards the end of the season, Addison falls in love with cardiovascular surgeon Noah Barnes, who as it turns out, is married and is expecting his first child. Matters become more complicated when Addison realizes that Noah's wife is one of her patients. Archer Montgomery (Grant Show), Addison's playboy brother, made sporadic appearances causing trouble for her and Naomi. Archer was found to have an aggressive brain tumor which was later diagnosed as parasites. Addison sought the professional help of her ex-husband, neurosurgeon Derek Shepherd (Patrick Dempsey). After Derek successfully saved Archer, Addison discovered Archer was back to his old tricks by cheating on Naomi. Violet stirred some of her own drama when she began dating Sheldon (Brian Benben), who works for Pacific Wellcare, and Pete. During the latter half of the season, Violet was found to be pregnant although she did not know who the father of her baby was. Furthermore, Violet found herself and her unborn baby at the mercy of a psychotic patient bent on taking Violet's baby by any means necessary in the closing moments of the season finale. Meanwhile, Dell struggled with his own issues caused by his former girlfriend's drug habits. He fights for custody of his daughter Betsey. Some of the medical cases that caused a stir and tension among the doctors at Private Practice was the issue of abortion (a first for the practice), the sex reassignment of a newborn, the sexual activity of a 12-year-old, the switching of embryos for two mothers-to-be and a young couple who later discovered they were siblings.

=== Season 3 (2009–2010) ===
In the third season, Violet survives the cliffhanger in Season 2 while she gives her baby Lucas to Pete while she recovers from the ordeal. Addison and Sam get even closer but decide not to become a couple because they don't want to hurt Naomi. Charlotte and Cooper break up, and Dell loses Heather in an explosion which nearly kills Betsey. Addison and Pete become a couple, which causes Addison to get close to Lucas until Violet wants Pete back even going as far as taking Pete to court to get joint custody. Sheldon falls for Charlotte after they start to sleep together. Sam and Naomi's daughter, Maya, gets pregnant and marries the father of her baby, Dink. Derek Shepherd's sister, Dr. Amelia Shepherd, arrives in town. In the season finale, Addison and Sam finally get together while Charlotte and Cooper get engaged much to Sheldon's dismay. Pete and Violet work over their issues, while Dell and Maya get involved in a car accident and the severity of Dell's condition is overlooked while Maya was being attended to in the operating room. Dr. Amelia Shepherd, younger sister of Derek Shepherd (Addison's ex-husband), operated on him but was unable to resuscitate following Dell's heart failure. Maya survived her operation to save her spinal cord and prevented paralysis while at the same time she gives birth to a girl, who also survives the ordeal.

=== Season 4 (2010–2011) ===
In the fourth season, Brian Benben and Caterina Scorsone were upgraded to series regulars. The season begins with the aftermath of Dell's death, and what happens to his daughter Betsey. Violet and Pete get married in the season premiere and begin a new life with their son Lucas. Addison and Sam reveal their romance to the staff of Oceanside Wellness, a development that Naomi accepts, upon which she leaves leave town to learn. Cooper and Charlotte get engaged. Charlotte is raped and badly beaten by one of the patients at her hospital. She tells only Addison about this, and swears her to secrecy. Later everyone finds out but she initially refuses to identify Lee McHenry as her rapist. It is later revealed that Violet was raped when she was in college. Charlotte eventually identifies Lee at the urging of Sheldon. She goes to the police, but since she did not come forward immediately, prosecutors decline to charge Lee. However, when he threatens his girlfriend, she stabs him in self defense, forcing Charlotte to save his life on the operating table. His girlfriend reports this to the authorities, which results in his arrest. In the season finale, it is decided Oceanside Wellness will be closed, and a new practice will be opened. Naomi decides it would be best to move to New York to be with Gabriel.

=== Season 5 (2011–2012) ===
On January 10, 2011, ABC renewed Private Practice for a fifth season. Audra McDonald, who plays the character Naomi Bennett, did not return as a regular cast member in the fifth season of Private Practice. Following the departure of Audra McDonald, Benjamin Bratt was added to the series as a regular cast member. He plays Jake Reilly, a fertility specialist "who is quite accomplished and up to speed with cutting-edge technology and procedures." The fifth season focuses on Amelia and her drug addiction, and the entire practice trying to save her life, ultimately deciding to have an intervention for her, and thus sending her to rehab. After rehab, Amelia finds out that she is pregnant by Ryan, a boyfriend who got her back into drugs and later died of an overdose. She finds out that the baby does not have a brain, but ultimately decides to take the baby to full term and donate the organs to save other children's lives. Later in the season, Cooper was revealed to have had an 8-year-old son from a previous one night stand. The son, who is named Mason, is portrayed by child actor Griffin Gluck. While Gluck initially served as a guest star, he was promoted to series regular later in the season. Gluck is notable for being the first child to be a series regular in Private Practice, or in the original series Grey's Anatomy. Mason's mother named Erica sought out Cooper after discovering that she was stricken with cancer, and she dies later in the season. Season 5 also deals with Addison not being able to have her own children, only to be able to adopt a child, Henry, just as Amelia's tragic news is given.

=== Season 6 (2012–2013) ===
On May 11, 2012, ABC renewed Private Practice for a sixth season, which premiered on September 25, 2012. Tim Daly, who plays Pete Wilder, did not return to the main cast in Season 6. In the sixth season premiere, Violet finds out that Pete hasn't shown up for court and assumes that he ran off only to find out later that he had a heart attack jogging and died. Charlotte finds outs that she's pregnant but is happy because her IUD will most likely destroy the pregnancy, only to find out she's pregnant with triplets. After a difficult pregnancy and even delivering one of the triplets at 26 weeks, Charlotte and Cooper eventually have three healthy daughters. The final episode of the series brings many happy endings: Addison and Jake marry; Sheldon quits the practice to spend time with his love who's dying of cancer; Sam and Naomi remarry and will be having a second baby; Amelia has found the love of her life; Violet finally gets over her issues with Pete's death and announces she's started writing her book.

Shortly after the May renewal, speculation arose that this would be the final season of the series. This appeared to be confirmed when Kate Walsh announced on June 12, 2012, that she would leave Private Practice after the thirteenth episode of season six. Private Practice creator Shonda Rhimes confirmed on October 19, 2012, that Season 6 and the show would end with the thirteenth episode.

=== Crossovers ===
Throughout the series' run, Private Practice had a handful of crossovers with its sister show, Grey's Anatomy.

==== Season 1 ====
- Private Practice: Richard Webber (James Pickens Jr.) appears in the opening minutes of the first episode convincing Addison to stay in Seattle. She says that she is leaving and he tells her he'll keep her job open for as long as he can and the two part ways.
- Grey's Anatomy: Addison Montgomery (Kate Walsh) returns to Seattle Grace for the first time since she left to perform a risky operation. She is shocked to learn how significantly everyone's lives have changed since she left.

Note: This episode took place while Private Practice was on an extended hiatus due to the 2007–2008 Writers Guild of America strike.

==== Season 2 ====
In February, Grey's Anatomy and Private Practice did their first extensive crossover storyline. The 3-episode arc started on Grey's Anatomy when Addison and Naomi Bennett (Audra McDonald) bring Archer Montgomery (Grant Show) to Seattle Grace to meet with Derek Shepherd (Patrick Dempsey), Mark Sloan (Eric Dane), Meredith Grey (Ellen Pompeo), and Richard to remove the parasites from Archer's brain. At first Derek says it's inoperable until Sam Bennett (Taye Diggs) later comes to Seattle and gives medical advice on how to remove the parasites. Derek and Meredith perform the operation successfully. The episode ends with Derek's patient Jen Harmon (Jennifer Westfeldt) having a complication from the brain surgery Derek performed on her shortly after Archer's surgery. The story continues on Private Practice where Sam has a sudden asthma attack and is treated by Naomi and Miranda Bailey (Chandra Wilson). Richard wants to publicize Archer's case. Mark convinces Sam that he had an asthma attack because of the stress of Archer being with Naomi, who he still has feelings for. Addison assists Derek and Alex Karev (Justin Chambers) on Jen's case. The episode ends with Jen having another complication. The story concludes on Grey's Anatomy. At this point, Naomi, Sam and Archer have returned to L.A. but Derek asks Addison to stay. Derek and Addison have an argument on their course of action for Jen and Jen dies in surgery.

==== Season 3 ====
- Private Practice: In the third episode, Miranda Bailey comes to Los Angeles with a patient to meet with the patient's sister about a kidney transplant.

In January, the show did another extensive crossover story with Grey's Anatomy. Addison comes to Seattle to operate on Mark's daughter, Sloan Riley (Leven Rambin). Then Mark and Sloan travel to Los Angeles for more surgery. Addison and Mark have an ongoing tryst during this crossover.

==== Season 4 ====
- Grey's Anatomy: In that season's third episode Amelia Shepherd (Caterina Scorsone) comes to Seattle to reconcile with Derek.
- Grey's Anatomy: Addison returns in the musical episode to assist the doctors on Callie Torres (Sara Ramirez), who had gotten into a serious car accident and was 6 months pregnant at the time. This is mentioned to explain Addison's absence in the Private Practice episode "The Hardest Part".

==== Season 5 ====
Grey's Anatomy and Private Practice did their last crossover before the series finale in 2013. On Grey's Anatomy, Amelia returns to Seattle to convince Derek and Lexie Grey (Chyler Leigh) to operate on Erica Warner (A.J. Langer), who has a gliosarcoma. Lexie helps Amelia practice and Derek eventually agrees to help as well. Then on Private Practice, Cooper Freedman (Paul Adelstein) and Charlotte King (KaDee Strickland) bring Erica to Seattle Grace to meet with Derek, Lexie and Amelia about the operation. Erica's surgery is successful.

==== Season 6 ====
Despite no characters crossing over, Addison receives a phone call from Derek about Mark's passing, which happens at the start of Grey's Anatomy's ninth season.

==== After Private Practice ====
In April 2014, Amelia returned to Grey's Anatomy for the last four episodes of the tenth season. She became a series regular from the eleventh season onwards.

In October 2021, Addison returned to Grey's Anatomy for two episodes of the eighteenth season. She performs a uterine transplant with the help of Meredith and allows for the surgery to be a teaching moment for Richard's residents. She later also reconnects with Amelia, with whom she discusses life during the COVID-19 pandemic, and meets Meredith and Derek's children.

== Cast ==
Actor	Character	Seasons					
Actor	Character	1	2	3	4	5	6
Kate Walsh	Addison Montgomery	Main	Main	Main	Main	Main	Main
Tim Daly	Pete Wilder	Main	Main	Main	Main	Main	
Audra McDonald (Note: Naomi was initially played by Merrin Dungey in the show's backdoor pilot. McDonald assumed the role from the first season onwards.)	Naomi Bennett	Main	Main	Main	Main		Guest
Paul Adelstein	Cooper Freedman	Main	Main	Main	Main	Main	Main
KaDee Strickland	Charlotte King	Main	Main	Main	Main	Main	Main
Chris Lowell	William "Dell" Parker	Main	Main	Main			
Taye Diggs	Sam Bennett	Main	Main	Main	Main	Main	Main
Amy Brenneman	Violet Turner	Main	Main	Main	Main	Main	Main
Brian Benben	Sheldon Wallace		Recurring	Also starring (Note: Benben is initially credited a guest star in season three before being promoted to also starring in the seventh episode.)	Main	Main	Main
Caterina Scorsone	Amelia Shepherd			Recurring	Main	Main	Main
Benjamin Bratt	Jake Reilly				Guest	Main	Main
Griffin Gluck	Mason Warner				Guest	Main	Main

Cast in the show included:

- Kate Walsh as Addison Montgomery - a double board-certified OB/GYN, subspecializing in maternal-fetal medicine/fetal surgery. She moves to the practice after divorcing Derek Shepherd and leaving Seattle. By the end of the show she marries Jake and adopts Henry.
- Tim Daly as Pete Wilder (seasons 1–5) - a naturopathic doctor and licensed herbalist. He practices alternative medicine and is also an ER doctor. He shares a child with Violet Turner and later marries her. He dies at the start of season 6 following an off-screen heart attack.
- Audra McDonald as Naomi Bennett (seasons 1–4, guest season 6) - a fertility and IVF doctor, she was married to Sam but they divorce before the first season. They share a daughter, Maya. They reunite at the end of the show after finding out she is pregnant.
- Paul Adelstein as Cooper Freedman - a pediatrician at the practice. He marries Charlotte King and they later have girl triplets. He also has his son Mason from a previous relationship, who he meets in season 5.
- KaDee Strickland as Charlotte King - chief of staff at St Ambrose Hospital, she practices urology and sexology. She is married to Cooper, with whom she shares triplet girls and Mason.
- Chris Lowell as William “Dell” Parker (seasons 1–3) - the receptionist at the practice who is a nurse and training to be a mid-wife. He has a daughter, Betsy. He harbours a crush on Naomi in the first season. He is killed following a car crash.
- Taye Diggs as Sam Bennett - a cardiologist and cardiothoracic surgeon. He was married to Naomi prior to the show, whom he shares his daughter Maya with. He dates Addison but they later split up as he cannot commit. He later remarries Naomi in the final episode.
- Amy Brenneman as Violet Turner - a psychiatrist at Oceanside Wellness Group (later Seaside Health & Wellness). She shares a child with Pete, whom she later marries.
- Brian Benben as Sheldon Wallace (recurring season 2, also starring season 3, main seasons 4–6) - a psychiatrist, initially hired at Pacific Wellcare, the practice upstairs to Oceanside Wellness Group (later Seaside Health & Wellness). He has romantic encounters with both Charlotte and Amelia. In the final season he develops cancer and dates a fellow patient at the hospital.
- Caterina Scorsone as Amelia Shepherd (recurring season 3, main seasons 4–6) - Addison's former sister-in-law, Derek Shepherd's youngest sister. A neurosurgeon at Oceanside Wellness Group (later Seaside Health & Wellness) and St Ambrose Hospital. She is a drug addict but later enters rehab, she later discovers she is pregnant by her dead boyfriend, who died of an overdose. The baby is born without a brain and Amelia donates his organs.
- Benjamin Bratt as Jake Reilly (guest season 4, main seasons 5–6) - the new fertility specialist at the practice after Naomi leaves. He is a widower. He dates and later marries Addison, and adopts Henry with her. He has a daughter from his previous marriage.
- Griffin Gluck as Mason Warner (seasons 5–6) - Cooper's 8-year-old son, from a previous one-night stand. His mother introduces him after finding out she is dying from a brain tumour. He then moves in with Cooper and Charlotte following his mom's death. He calls Charlotte "mama" to honor her as a mother, whilst keeping his other mother "mom".

== Production ==
=== Origin and development ===
Private Practice intertitle

On February 21, 2007, The Wall Street Journal reported that the American Broadcasting Company (ABC) was developing a spin-off of Grey's Anatomy centered on Kate Walsh's character, Addison Montgomery. Subsequent reports confirmed that an expanded two-hour episode of Grey's Anatomy, which aired on May 3, 2007, would serve as a backdoor pilot for the spin-off. The episode features Montgomery taking a leave from Seattle Grace Hospital to visit the Oceanside Wellness Centre in Los Angeles. This backdoor pilot was broadcast as the 22nd and 23rd episodes of the season and was directed by Michael Grossman, as reported by Variety. Gossip columnists Kristin dos Santos and Michael Ausiello also confirmed that the spin-off would be set in Los Angeles.

=== Casting ===
On June 29, 2007, ABC announced that Merrin Dungey, who played the role of Naomi Bennett, would be replaced by four-time Tony Award winner Audra McDonald. ABC did not provide a reason for the change. On July 11, 2007, it was revealed that a new character, portrayed by KaDee Strickland, had been added to the main cast. Tony Award winner Idina Menzel appeared in two episodes during the second season, alongside her then-husband and Private Practice star Taye Diggs. Other notable guest stars included David Sutcliffe, Jayne Brook, and Josh Hopkins.

=== Location ===
Private Practice filmed many of its exterior shots, as well as some outdoor storylines, in Santa Monica, California. The Oceanside Wellness Group building is located at the corner of 4th and Wilshire in Santa Monica. Characters Addison Montgomery and Sam Bennett are depicted as living in beachfront houses in Malibu, California, which in reality would cost upwards of $4 million each.

== Broadcast ==
On May 3, 2007, the backdoor pilot for Private Practice aired on the American Broadcasting Company (ABC) as part of a double episode of Grey's Anatomy titled "The Other Side of This Life." The pilot introduced the main characters of Private Practice and provided a brief overview of their roles. The cast included Amy Brenneman, Paul Adelstein, Tim Daly, Taye Diggs, Chris Lowell, and Merrin Dungey.

The two-hour backdoor pilot for Private Practice averaged 21 million viewers, surpassing Grey's Anatomy's third season average of 19.1 million viewers per episode. The episode ranked #1 in both the 9:00 PM and 10:00 PM time slots. On May 5, 2007, it was announced on The Ellen DeGeneres Show that Private Practice would be part of ABC's 2007 fall lineup. The first television promo for the series aired during the Grey's Anatomy Season 3 finale on May 17, 2007, and the series premiere followed on September 26, 2007, averaging 14.41 million viewers, making it the most-watched show in its time slot. The series premiered in the UK on July 15, 2008, on LIVING. In mid-season 2009, Private Practice was moved to Thursdays at 10:00 PM after Grey's Anatomy to accommodate the return of Lost. On May 16, 2011, Sky Living Loves broadcast repeats of Season 3 at 7:00 PM and 12:00 AM. On September 5, 2011, Sky Living Loves broadcast repeats of Season 2 at 8:00 AM and 2:00 PM.

=== Syndication ===
Private Practice began airing in broadcast syndication on weekends starting on September 15, 2012.

=== International ===
International Broadcasting

Country	Network
Albania	Digi Plus
(Arab League) Arab World	OSN First, Fox Series
Angola	TPA1
Argentina	Sony Entertainment Television
Australia	Seven Network
Austria	ORF 1
Belgium	RTL-TVI, vtm and VIJFtv
Brazil	Sony Entertainment Television
Bulgaria	Fox Life, BNT 1
Canada	A (Season 1–4), City (Season 5–6)
Colombia	Sony Entertainment Television
Costa Rica	Sony Entertainment Television
Croatia	Nova TV, Fox Life
Chile	Sony Entertainment Television
Dominican Republic	Sony Entertainment Television
Denmark	Kanal 4
Ecuador	Sony Entertainment Television
Estonia	Fox Life
Finland	MTV3
France	France 2
Germany	Pro7
Greece	Fox Life Greece, ANT1
Hong Kong	Star World, ATV World
Hungary	RTL Klub
Iceland	Sjónvarpið
India	Zee Café; Star World India
(Republic of Ireland) Ireland	RTÉ 2
Israel	yes stars Drama\yes stars HD
Italy	Foxlife, Rai Due
Japan	WOWOW
Latvia	Fox Life
(North Macedonia) Macedonia	Fox Life
Malaysia	ntv7, Star World
Mexico	Sony Entertainment Television, Azteca 7
Netherlands	NET 5
New Zealand	TV2
Norway	TV2
Paraguay	Sony Entertainment Television
Peru	Sony Entertainment Television
Philippines	Studio 23
Poland	Fox Life
Portugal	Fox Life and RTP2
Puerto Rico	WAPA-TV
Romania	Prima TV, Euforia Lifestyle TV
Russia	Fox Life
Serbia	Fox Life
Singapore	MediaCorp Channel 5
Slovenia	Kanal A
South Africa	M-net
Spain	FOX, Cosmopolitan and Antena 3
Sweden	TV4
Switzerland	RSI La 1 (Italian), TSR (French), SF zwei (German)
Thailand	Star World
Turkey	DiziMax
United Kingdom	Previously Sky Living and later repeated on Sky Living Loves
Uruguay	Sony Entertainment Television
Venezuela	Sony Entertainment Television
Vietnam	Star World

== Home media ==
To date, Walt Disney Studios Home Entertainment (under the ABC Studios brand) has released the entire series on DVD in Regions 1, 2, and 4. The series is also available for download on iTunes Store.

Season	Episodes	Title	DVD release dates		
Season	Episodes	Title	Region 1	Region 2	Region 4
1	9	The Complete First Season	September 16, 2008	March 16, 2009	December 3, 2008
2	22	The Complete Second Season	September 15, 2009	March 1, 2010	November 2, 2009
3	23	The Complete Third Season	September 14, 2010	March 21, 2011	November 3, 2010
4	22	The Complete Fourth Season	September 13, 2011	April 2, 2012	October 12, 2011
5	22	The Complete Fifth Season	September 11, 2012	February 4, 2013	November 14, 2012
6	13	The Complete Sixth and Final Season	May 7, 2013	December 2, 2013	November 6, 2013

== Reception ==
Private Practice initially received mixed reviews. Metacritic, which assigns a weighted mean rating out of 100 to reviews from mainstream critics, gave the show a score of 45 based on 25 critical reviews. The first episode was criticized by some, with The New York Times describing the show's characters as "collectively offer[ing] one of the most depressing portrayals of the female condition since The Bell Jar."

=== U.S. television ratings ===
Season	Timeslot (EST)	Number of Episodes	Premiere		Finale		TV Season	Overall rank	18–49 rank	Overall viewership
Season	Timeslot (EST)	Number of Episodes	Date	Viewers (millions)	Date	Viewers (millions)	TV Season	Overall rank	18–49 rank	Overall viewership
1	Wednesday 9:00 pm	9	September 26, 2007	14.41	December 5, 2007	10.40	2007–08	#12	#13	10.76
2	Wednesday 9:00 pm (2008) Thursday 10:00 pm (2009)	22	October 1, 2008	8.16	April 30, 2009	9.70	2008–09	#27	#10	9.20
3	Thursday 10:00 pm	23	October 1, 2009	11.58	May 13, 2010	9.28	2009–10	#42	#37	9.15
4	Thursday 10:00 pm	22	September 23, 2010	8.83	May 19, 2011	7.45	2010–11	#58	#48	7.75
5	Thursday 10:00 pm (2011–2012) (1–17) Tuesday 10:00 pm (2012) (18–22)	22	September 29, 2011	7.79	May 15, 2012	6.81	2011–12	#63	#49	8.80
6	Tuesday 10:00 pm	13	September 25, 2012	6.45	January 22, 2013	5.32	2012–13	#58	#51	7.03

=== Awards and accolades ===
Awards and accolades for Private Practice
Award	Year	Category	Recipients	Result	Ref.
ALMA Awards	2012	Favorite TV Actor	Benjamin Bratt	Nominated	
BMI Film & TV Awards	2008	BMI TV Music Award	Chad Fischer and Tim Bright	Won	
BMI Film & TV Awards	2009	BMI TV Music Award	Chad Fischer and Tim Bright	Won	
GLAAD Media Awards	2010	Outstanding Individual Episode	"Homeward Bound"	Nominated	
GLAAD Media Awards	2010	Outstanding Individual Episode	"Wait and See"	Nominated	
Hollywood Music in Media Awards	2009	Outstanding Music Supervision – TV	Alexandra Patsavas	Nominated	
NAACP Image Awards	2008	Outstanding Supporting Actor in a Drama Series	Taye Diggs	Nominated	
NAACP Image Awards	2008	Outstanding Supporting Actress in a Drama Series	Audra McDonald	Nominated	
NAACP Image Awards	2008	Outstanding Writing in a Drama Series	Shonda Rhimes (for "In Which We Meet Addison, a Nice Girl From Somewhere Else")	Nominated	
NAACP Image Awards	2009	Outstanding Supporting Actor in a Drama Series	Taye Diggs	Won	
NAACP Image Awards	2009	Outstanding Supporting Actress in a Drama Series	Audra McDonald	Nominated	
NAACP Image Awards	2010	Outstanding Actor in a Drama Series	Taye Diggs	Nominated	
NAACP Image Awards	2010	Outstanding Supporting Actress in a Drama Series	Audra McDonald	Nominated	
NAACP Image Awards	2011	Outstanding Writing in a Drama Series	Shonda Rhimes (for "Did You Hear What Happened to Charlotte King?")	Won	
NAMIC Vision Awards	2009	Drama	Private Practice	Nominated	
People's Choice Awards	2008	Favorite New TV Drama	Private Practice	Nominated	
People's Choice Awards	2011	Favorite TV Drama Actor	Taye Diggs	Nominated	
People's Choice Awards	2011	Favorite TV Drama Actress	Kate Walsh	Nominated	
PRISM Awards	2010	Drama Series Multi-Episode Storyline	"Contamination" / "What Women Want" / "Yours, Mine and Ours"	Nominated	
PRISM Awards	2011	Drama Series Multi-Episode Storyline – Mental Health	"Did You Hear What Happened to Charlotte King?" / "What Happens Next" / "Can't Find My Way Back Home"	Nominated	
PRISM Awards	2011	Female Performance in a Drama Series Multi-Episode Storyline	KaDee Strickland	Won	
Young Artist Awards	2009	Best Performance in a TV Series – Guest Starring Young Actor	Joey Luthman	Won	
Young Artist Awards	2010	Best Performance in a TV Series – Guest Starring Young Actress	Emily Rae	Nominated	

== Turkish adaptation ==
A Turkish adaptation titled Merhaba Hayat began airing on Fox in October 2012.
