= Naomi Bennett =

- Private Practice & Grey's Anatomy character
- First appearance: Grey's Anatomy: "The Other Side of This Life, Part 1" 3x22 Private Practice: "In Which We Meet Addison, a Nice Girl From Somewhere Else" 1x01
- Last appearance: Grey's Anatomy: "Before and After" 5x15 Private Practice: "...To Change the Things I Can" 4x22 (as regular cast) "In Which We Say Goodbye" 6x13 (as guest)
- Created by: Shonda Rhimes
- Portrayed by: Merrin Dungey (backdoor pilot); Audra McDonald

In-universe information
- Nickname: Nai
- Title(s): Director at Pacific Wellcare Center (former); Director at Oceanside Wellness Group (former); M.D. F.A.C.O.G.
- Occupation: Physician at Pacific Wellcare Center (former); Physician at Oceanside Wellness Group (former)
- Family: Philmore "Dink" Davis (son-in-law via Maya); Olivia Davis (grand-daughter via Maya)
- Spouses: Sam Bennett (remarried)
- Significant others: William White (deceased); Dr. Gabriel Fife (ex-fiancé); Archer Montgomery (ex-boyfriend)
- Children: Maya Davis (née Bennett; daughter with Sam); Betsey Parker (adoptive daughter); Unnamed child (with Sam)

Dr. Naomi Bennett is a fictional character on the Grey's Anatomy spin-off Private Practice. She was initially portrayed by Merrin Dungey in the backdoor pilot Grey's Anatomy episode, "The Other Side of This Life", but was replaced by Audra McDonald prior to the show's first season. Naomi is a fertility specialist and founding partner of the Oceanside Wellness Group in Los Angeles. She is the best friend of central character Addison Montgomery (Kate Walsh) and was married to the practice's internist Sam (Taye Diggs), with whom she has a daughter, Maya. She left Private Practice at the end of the fourth season but returned for the series finale.

== Storylines ==
Naomi is a founding partner of the Oceanside Wellness Center in Los Angeles, California, where she works as a fertility specialist, board-certified in reproductive endocrinology, obstetrics, and gynecology. She attended Columbia University College of Physicians and Surgeons, and is a member of the American Society for Reproductive Medicine, the Society of Reproductive Endocrinology and Infertility, and the American College of Obstetricians and Gynecologists. She works alongside her ex-husband Sam (Taye Diggs), from who she divorced prior to the beginning of the series. Together they have a teenage daughter named Maya (Geffri Maya Hightower), whose godmother is Naomi's best friend from medical school, Addison Montgomery (Kate Walsh). Naomi offers Addison a position at the Oceanside Wellness Group, which she accepts, prompting her move to Los Angeles.

Initially, Naomi's relationship with Sam is relatively amicable but often strained. The reasons for their divorce are unclear, with Sam saying he was "unhappy" but that he had "no good reason" for asking for a divorce and Naomi seemingly resentful of this. However, the two have sex after Sam is involved in a hostage situation. Naomi later calls this incident a "slip-up," but the two end up having sex again.

The office receptionist Dell has a crush on Naomi, showing it by getting her coffee, bringing her home-baked chocolate cake, and frequently complimenting her. Naomi doesn't take his crush too seriously, calling him a "child". Both Sam and Dell ultimately tell Naomi their intentions to fight for her, leaving Naomi confused about her own emotions. Dell's romantic interest in Naomi is not addressed following the Season 1 finale.

The practice's financial troubles due to Naomi's mismanagement eventually emerge. Naomi reveals to Addison that they are in danger of losing the practice because of their debt. However, Naomi's inaction on the matter leads Addison to reveal the practice's financial distress to Sam. Naomi is upset by what she sees as Addison's betrayal of trust. Addison and Sam launch a takeover of the practice, ultimately leaving Addison in charge. Despite their conflict over the practice, Naomi and Sam continue to have a sexual relationship. Once their daughter Maya learns of their rekindled relationship, Naomi and Sam decide to end their relationship for good. Eventually, Naomi is able to forgive Addison for her betrayal, and Naomi takes the lapse in her administrative control of the practice as an opportunity to focus on her work. Briefly, she dates Addison's brother, Archer Montgomery (Grant Show).

Naomi and Sam's teenage daughter Maya discloses that she is pregnant. Naomi is unable to deal with her daughter's unexpected pregnancy and walks out on her daughter, leaving Sam to deal with it. Later, Naomi returns and gets upset with Maya, going as far as to slap her, when she refuses to have an abortion. Violet and Addison are worried about Naomi, as she has previously been firmly against abortion, but Maya finally agrees to termination. When Addison is about to perform the abortion, however, Maya changes her mind, further upsetting Naomi. When Maya and her boyfriend Dink get engaged, Naomi remains removed from the wedding planning process.

The owner of Pacific Wellcare Center William White (James Morrison (actor)) expresses a romantic interest in Naomi. Naomi also starts a flirtation with genetic specialist Gabriel Fife (Michael Patrick Thornton), who was recently hired at Oceanside Wellness Center. Eventually, Naomi chooses to pursue a relationship with William. William leaves for Switzerland to undergo treatment for Amyotrophic lateral sclerosis, which he does not disclose to Naomi. When Fife tells Naomi about William's ALS diagnosis, she leaves for Switzerland to be with him. As his condition rapidly declines, William returns to Los Angeles to see his daughter one last time before his death.

Following William's death, Naomi inherits significant money from him. She decides to merge Oceanside Wellness Group and Pacific Wellcare Center and begins traveling as part of her work with the William White Foundation. Fife continues to romantically pursue her. During a heated argument with Sam, Addison, and Fife, Naomi states that the practice is not the same as when she started it and that she doesn't want to stay a part of it anymore, shocking them. When Betsey's foster parents abandon her at the hospital, Naomi decides to adopt her. Fife proposes to Naomi, and Fife, Naomi, and Betsey decide to move to New York City so they can be close to Maya, who was recently accepted into Columbia University. Season 4 is Naomi's final season as a series regular in the show.

Naomi returns for Addison's wedding in the Season 6 finale "In Which We Say Goodbye," where she has sex with Sam. Naomi returns pregnant with Sam's baby for an ultrasound with Addison. Naomi reveals that she and Fife have separated, but Naomi is hesitant to tell Sam about the pregnancy, as she believes Sam doesn't want another child. Naomi returns to New York without telling Sam about the pregnancy. Addison doesn't reveal Naomi's pregnancy, but tells Sam that Naomi still loves him. Sam travels to New York and professes his love for her, and finds out about the pregnancy.

== Development ==
Naomi was created by Shonda Rhimes, who wanted the show's central character Addison to have a close friend from her college days. The character is based on a friend of Rhimes', who "married her college sweetheart and is strong and smart and funny." Naomi was played by Merrin Dungey in the backdoor pilot episode "The Other Side of This Life", but was replaced by Audra McDonald prior to the show's first season. Rhimes explained that the production team "wanted to put an edge on Naomi that we could define more clearly." McDonald assessed that Dungey's dismissal was hard as a result of its having been so public, but commented that she herself had once been similarly replaced, having played Bill Cosby's daughter in the pilot episode of Cosby, only to be replaced thereafter.

== Reception ==
Discussing the first episode of the show following the pilot, Variety's Cynthia Littleton observed: "I can definitely see why creator/exec producer Shonda Rhimes made the call to recast Audra McDonald in the key role of Naomi Bennett". Fellow Variety critic Brian Lowry was more negative in his consideration of the episode, noting that Naomi and Sam's "'No, you left me first' interaction already feels tedious." Jon Caramanica of the Los Angeles Times has criticized McDonald's performance as Naomi in the show's first season, writing that: "she was rigorously firm, almost dispassionate. As people bed-hopped and were emotionally flimsy around her, she remained stern at the center [...] McDonald is a strong, vivid actress, but such gravity felt at odds with the breezy tone of Private Practice." Caramancia opined that "the tougher Naomi became, the lighter Addison had to be to keep the show's balance", and that as a result the series "regularly felt unmoored and became something of a critical punching bag". He was much more positive regarding her performance in the second season premiere episode "A Family Thing", observing: "Toward the end of the episode, there is a brief scene in which she, beleaguered and on her last leg, utterly melts into Sam. In those 15 seconds, McDonald's genius as an actress is clear, communicating with just a few facial movements and shading of the eyes a world of hurt and letdown. [...] And later in the episode, when she thinks things are falling back into place, her soft, knowing, warm smile is one of the show's greatest victories, even though it comes just before everything goes wrong once again."
