= Pete Wilder =

- Private Practice & Grey's Anatomy character
- First appearance: Grey's Anatomy: "The Other Side of This Life (Part 1)" 3x22 Private Practice: "In Which We Meet Addison, a Nice Girl From Somewhere Else" 1x01
- Last appearance: Grey's Anatomy: "The Other Side of This Life (Part 2)" 3x23 Private Practice: "Gone, Baby, Gone" 5x22
- Created by: Shonda Rhimes
- Portrayed by: Tim Daly

In-universe information
- Alias: Pete
- Gender: Male
- Title: M.D.
- Occupation: Physician at Seaside Health & Wellness (former); Physician at Pacific Wellcare Center (former); Physician at Oceanside Wellness Group (former); Emergency Room Doctor at St. Ambrose Hospital (former); Physician with Doctors Without Borders (former); Owner of the Infectious Diseases practice in Beverly Hills (former)
- Family: Frances Wilder (mother) (deceased); Adam Wilder (brother)
- Spouses: Anna Wilder (deceased); Violet Turner (widow)
- Significant others: Meg Porter; Addison Montgomery; Lisa King
- Children: Lucas Wilder (son with Violet)

Dr. Pete Wilder is a character on the Grey's Anatomy spin-off Private Practice. He is portrayed by actor Tim Daly.

== Character history ==
=== Season 1 ===
Pete works at the Oceanside Wellness Center in Los Angeles as a naturopathic doctor and licensed herbalist. He graduated from medical school and practiced traditional western medicine for a number of years before spending five years in China studying alternative medicine. Pete’s medical practice combines eastern and western medicine in an integrative approach, and he is often asked to provide expectant mothers with holistic birthing plans. Pete has also lectured locally and internationally on the subject of Oriental and Eastern Medicine.

During Dr. Addison Forbes Montgomery's first visit to Oceanside Wellness, Pete and Addison establish a teasing and often flirtatious relationship. Addison initially labels Pete a “quack,” but eventually allows the “cute hippy boy” to treat her with acupuncture. Although Pete is immediately attracted to her, he promises their mutual friend, Dr. Sam Bennett, that he will stay away from Addison. However, after finding Addison crying over her newly discovered infertility, Pete kisses her to prove that she is not “dried up". Addison seems open to pursuing a relationship with Pete, but Sam cautions her, claiming that Pete is a serial monogamist, who has been unable to emotionally connect with any woman since his wife's death. Pete's last foray into office romance was apparently disastrous, and resulted in the unnamed OB/GYN's sudden departure from the practice. In response, Oceanside Wellness instituted a strict "no consorting" rule.

Pete's relationship with his wife is somewhat mysterious and he appears reluctant to discuss their marriage. During a visit to her grave on the anniversary of her death, it is revealed that Anna Wilder died in 2001, at the age of 40. In "The Other Side of This Life," Sam stated that Pete’s wife had died eight years prior. However, in a subsequent interview, Tim Daly said that there is some confusion as to whether Anna died six or eight years prior, which was finally decided to be six years prior.) In a discussion regarding a patient, Pete hints to the other doctors that he stayed in an unhappy marriage because his wife was sick, and that they were unable to make the marriage work. Pete eventually tells Addison that he went to bed with his wife on a Tuesday night and when he awoke the following Wednesday morning, she was dead. He further states that no night was perfect during their marriage, not even their wedding night. This information was the most that Pete has ever divulged to any of his co-workers about his wife. During a second visit to his wife's grave, Pete unleashes his pent-up anger to his wife's headstone. After stating that Anna was "a mean, cold bitch" and that he hated her, Pete softens and apologizes for not being able to save her. Pete later reveals to Violet that at the time of Anna's death, they had been trying to conceive a child.

=== Season 2 ===
In the fourth episode, a mysterious woman from Pete's past appears in the clinic and reveals surprising facts about his past. Meg Porter (played by Jayne Brook) is a Doctors Without Borders physician and Pete's former lover. They met when they were both residents and later worked together with Doctors Without Borders. Meg reveals to Pete's surprised co-workers that once, during the war in Bosnia, Pete (whom Meg calls Peter) refused to evacuate and, despite the mortar fire, stayed with sick children for the whole night saving the lives of most of them. Later, Pete told Meg, who has a smoking habit, that his wife was a smoker and she didn't quit the habit before she died. Despite their renewed relationship, Meg decides to go back to Ghana, where she works in an anti-malaria program, but Pete asked her to come back to him because she makes him happy. Meg returned later to L.A. and even tried to give up smoking for Pete, but despite that, the relationship didn't work. Meg wasn't sure if she wanted to live in L.A., and Pete admitted that ever since his unhappy marriage he doesn't trust women anymore. When Pete and his Oceanside Wellness Center colleague Violet hooked-up, the relationship with Meg was definitely over.

The relationship with Violet started with just sex, but Pete later realized that he wanted more. When he asked Violet if they could move to the next level and begin a real relationship, she turned him down, saying she doesn't trust him because of his past. But it was Violet's behavior that really put an end to things when she started secretly dating Sheldon, the therapist from the rival practice, The Pacific Wellcare. Pete ended their relationship because of Violet's infidelity. Afterward, Violet reveals to both Pete and Sheldon she's pregnant, and was willing to raise the child, but preferred to ignore who the father is. In the Season Two finale, Pete confronts Violet and says that he loves her and they could be a real family. Violet turns him down, but later she kisses him and confesses her feelings towards him. In the end, Violet's patient, Katie, thinks Violet's baby is her own. Katie kidnaps Violet's baby, ending the finale as a cliffhanger.

=== Season 3 ===
Pete and Violet decide to try to be a family.

=== Season 4 ===
In the Season Four premiere, Pete popped the question to Violet after a morning of passion. The wedding was set for the following weekend. Violet bolted from the ceremony halfway down the aisle, but was wordlessly convinced by Pete to come back and the two were wed. In the Season Four finale, Violet finds out that her license is being suspended and Pete tells her that maybe they should split. The final scene of Season Four shows Pete, alone with Lucas, having a heart attack with no one around to help him.

=== Season 5 ===
No one is around to help Pete. Cooper arrives and finds him unconscious. He's rushed to the hospital where Sam and Amelia work to save his life. Violet returns, shocked at what has happened. Pete has an emergency quadruple bypass. Amelia operates on him under the influence. The surgery is a success. Afterwards, everything seems fine between Violet and Pete until Pete begins lashing out at Violet and she becomes his verbal punching bag and he offers her no support as she struggles to return to the practice. Sheldon becomes Pete's unofficial therapist. Pete begins treating Violet as though he hates her. Sheldon warns him that he will lose her and Lucas if he continues this behavior. Violet and Pete try to make it work but Violet doesn't want him to hate her as he did hate his deceased wife. The two agree to amicably separate.

=== Season 6 ===
Pete has a second heart attack while jogging and dies off camera.

== Trivia ==
- Before settling on the name Pete Wilder, the creators of the show considered and rejected "Pete Finch" and "Pete Fisher".
- Pete rode a Triumph motorcycle.
- According to Sam, Pete couldn't parallel park to save his life.
- Pete wanted a Balinese party instead of a normal funeral.
- Pete never ate the crust off his pizza.
- He loved mint chocolate chip ice cream.
- He liked meatloaf.
- He spoke Spanish.
- Pete and his brother Adam used to egg trick or treaters on Halloween.
- Since his heart attack, he drinks decaffeinated coffee and eats broccoli, even though he hates it.
