= Sam Bennett (Private Practice) =

- Private Practice & Grey's Anatomy character
- First appearance: Grey's Anatomy: "The Other Side of This Life, Part 1" 3x22 Private Practice: "In Which We Meet Addison, a Nice Girl From Somewhere Else" 1x01
- Last appearance: Grey's Anatomy: "Before and After" 5x15 Private Practice: "In Which We Say Goodbye" 6x13
- Created by: Shonda Rhimes
- Portrayed by: Taye Diggs

In-universe information
- Nicknames: Sam; Dr. Feelgood; Douchnozzle
- Title(s): Founding Partner of the Oceanside Wellness Group; M.D.
- Occupation: Internal Medicine Specialist at Seaside Health & Wellness; Attending cardiothoracic surgeon at St Ambrose Hospital; Internal Medicine Specialist at Oceanside Wellness Group (former)
- Family: Corinne Bennett (sister); Philmore "Dink" Davis (son-in-law via Maya); Olivia Davis (grand-daughter via Maya)
- Spouse: Naomi Bennett (Remarried)
- Significant others: Vanessa Hoyt; Addison Montgomery; Sonya Nichols
- Children: Maya Davis (née Bennett; daughter with Naomi); Unnamed child (with Naomi); Betsey Parker (adoptive step-daughter via Naomi)

Dr. Samuel Bennett is a character on the Grey's Anatomy spin-off, Private Practice. He is portrayed by actor Taye Diggs.

== Character history ==
Dr. Sam Bennett, or "Dr. Feelgood" as he's known to patients across the globe, is another founding partner of the Oceanside Wellness Group and the practice's internist. He is the author of the best-selling nonfiction book, Body Language: The Mind-Body Connection. Oceanside Wellness Group, with its co-operative and whole-body approach to medicine, is illustrative of the views advocated in the book.

In "Right Here, Right Now" (Season 3, Episode 03) it is said that he did his residency in surgery, specializing in Cardiothoracic Surgery.

In "The Next Episode" (Season 6, Episode 05), Sam's mother, Dee, comes to him for help for her boss, Raymond, who has heart issues. Sam is thrown when he sees Dee kissing the married Raymond and realizes they're having an affair. When Raymond collapses after surgery, Sam discovers he needs a new lung but there are no donors. Raymond's wife, Jillian, shocks everyone by first revealing she has known all along about Raymond and Dee's affair and also by how Raymond is Sam's real father. Sam is naturally jarred to learn his mother has lied to him all his life and how Raymond helped pay for Sam's medical school costs. Sam talks to Raymond, telling him that he's become the man he is despite Raymond not being around. Raymond replies that he is proud of that man, he and Sam shaking hands to part on good terms.

== Relationships ==
Sam met Naomi in medical school at the Columbia University College of Physicians and Surgeons, where they also met and befriended Derek Shepherd, Mark Sloan and Addison Montgomery. The two married and had a daughter, Maya Bennett, now age 15. Although the couple attempt to present the image of an amicably divorced couple, the post-marital relationship has, at times, been strained. The reasons for their divorce are unclear. In "The Other Side of This Life", Sam professes to Addison that he had "no good reason" for requesting the divorce. In the episode, In Which We Meet Addison, a Nice Girl From Somewhere Else, Sam states that he was "unhappy" and wanted Naomi to fight for their relationship. The couple looked to be headed toward reconciliation. Sam and Naomi rekindle their sexual relationship in In Which Sam Gets Taken For a Ride, after Sam survives a hostage situation. Although Sam and Naomi called the conference-room sex a "slip up," the couple sleep together again in In Which Cooper Finds a Port In His Storm.

It appears that Sam and Naomi share joint custody of Maya, although her primary residence may be with Naomi. In the episode In Which Addison Finds the Magic, Naomi states that Maya had asked to spend the entire week at Sam's home.

Sam asked Addison out before Naomi when attending Columbia. It was revealed in season 3, episode 7 of Private Practice that Sam and Addison might be harboring feelings for each other after sharing a kiss at the end of a terrifying ordeal. They kiss again when Addison decided to sleep over at Sam's, hurt and vulnerable after finding her mom and Susan kissing. When Mark Sloan comes to the practice for a checkup with his pregnant teen daughter Sloan, Sam catches him and Addison having sex in her office. Sam is shown to be concerned, as he knows about Mark's playboyish ways, and didn't want Mark to lead Addison on, hinting a bit of jealousy. Following that, they became closer until Addison put a halt on their developing relationship in "Shotgun," worried about the consequences in her relationship with Naomi for sleeping with Sam. In "Love Bites," Addison admitted to Pete, with whom she was having comfort sex, that she was in love with Sam, though he is angry and hurt by her rejection at the end of the last episode. Sam begins seeing a well known doctor, Dr. Vanessa Hoyt, and Addison begins dating Pete. They still show they harbor feelings for each other, even a hint of jealousy when they see the other with their current significant others. Vanessa realized that Sam is still in love with Addison when Sam backed Addison up on how to treat a patient and the three surrogate babies she was carrying. She ends things with Sam. After she breaks up with Sam, he kisses Addison again, saying he was tired of doing the right thing, and wanted to do the wrong thing. Although she was with Pete, she kisses Sam back and Pete catches them. Naomi then finds out about their feelings for each other, and she decides to end her friendship with Addison.

It is revealed that his daughter Maya is pregnant. Sam deals with this much better than Naomi, even supporting the marriage between Maya and Dink (the father), though he is certainly not pleased with the circumstances. After Maya and Dell get into a car accident, Addison operates on her to try and save her and her unborn child. The operation is successful and Maya gives birth to Sam's newborn granddaughter Olivia.

Sam and Addison finally get together in the season 3 finale.

During the season 4 opener Sam and Addison's relationship seemed to have not worked out, but at the end of the episode they are sharing a bathtub, showing that they are a couple indeed. In the second episode they debate over whether or not they want to go public with their newfound romance, mainly because of Naomi and how she would react. Sam urges Addison to tell Naomi about them, which she does, and she doesn't take the news well. But Naomi tries to deal with the fact that her best friend and ex-husband are together and maintained a friendship with Addison. Addison and Sam's relationship, which Addison dubbed "AddiSam" is shown to be a healthy and steady relationship, as Addison says that Sam is the perfect guy "with no flaws". Although Addison wants to have children, Sam tells her he's not ready to have more children, as he wants to take time in their romance. Addison's mother Bizzy returns seeking Addison's help in treating her partner Susan, ill with a tumor. After Addison and Dr. Rodriguez seem to have cured her cancer, Addison plans Bizzy and Susan's wedding. After Naomi spots Dr. Rodriguez flirting with Addison, she tells Addison that her and Sam's relationship is becoming serious and real, and that's when Addison usually screws up. Addison assures Naomi that she doesn't want to ruin it with Sam. Out of panic, she proposes to Sam. He talks to Amelia, telling her that although he didn't want to rule out marriage, it was too early in the relationship, and he knew it didn't feel right.

== Reception ==
Shawna Malcom of the Los Angeles Times deemed Sam and Bailey her favourite pairing of the Grey's Anatomy and Private Practice crossover, praising: "The grief he gave her about becoming a pediatric surgeon … the grief she gave him for letting ex-wife Naomi go and wind up in the arms of Archer … the fist bump. I say again, the fist bump! Together, Chandra Wilson and Taye Diggs are hilarious and touching and all sorts of fabulous. Here’s hoping this isn’t the last we ever see of this unexpectedly dynamic duo." The character was listed in Wetpaint's "10 Hottest Male Doctors on TV" and in BuzzFeed's "16 Hottest Doctors On Television".
