= Chris Lowell =

American actor

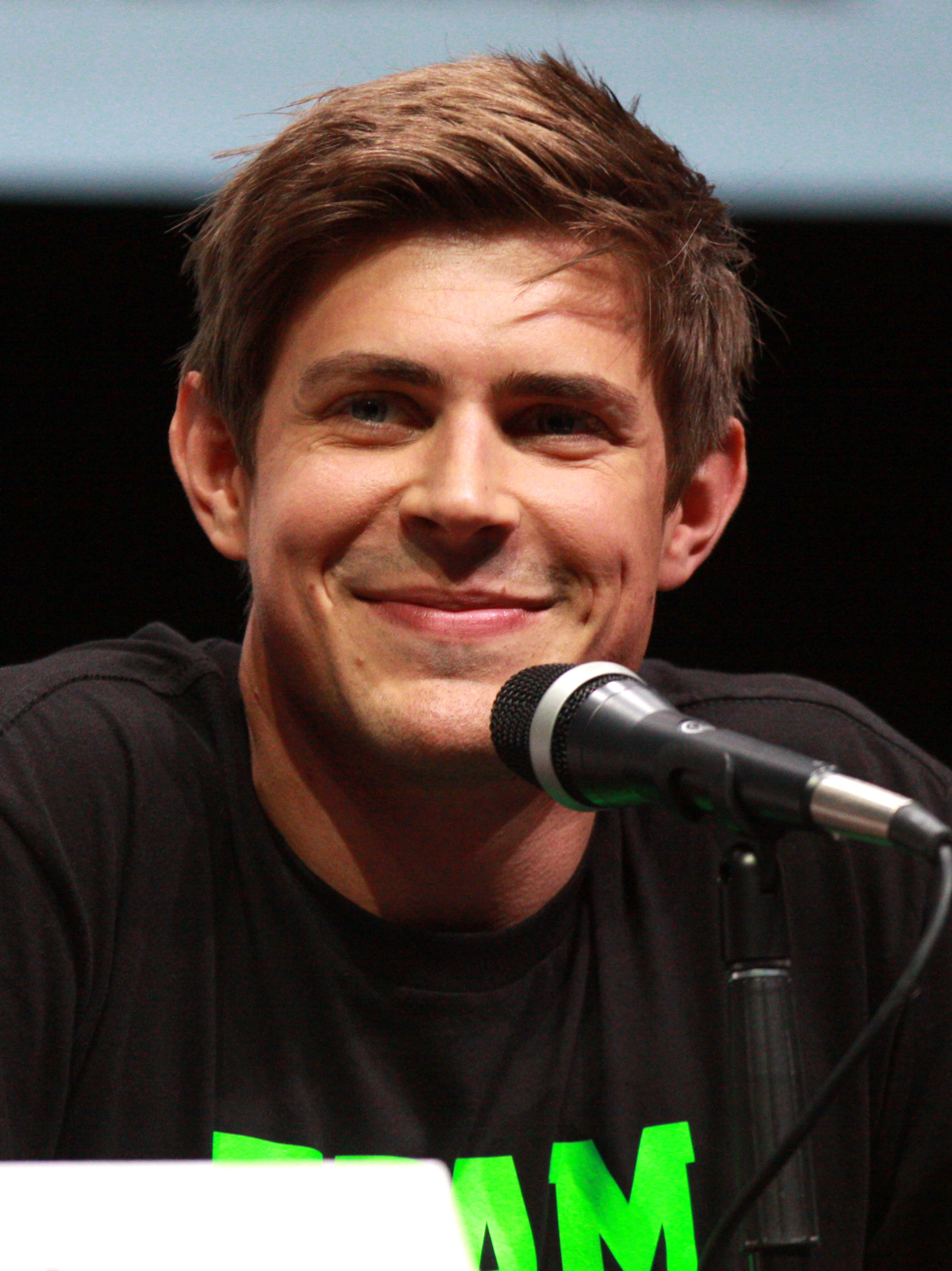
- Lowell at the 2013 San Diego Comic-Con
- Born: Christopher Lowell; October 17, 1984 (age 42); Atlanta, Georgia, U.S.
- Education: Atlanta International School; University of Southern California
- Occupation: Actor
- Years active: 2004–present
- Spouse: Kerry Bishé
- Children: 1

Christopher Lowell (born October 17, 1984) is an American actor. He is best known for playing the roles of Stosh "Piz" Piznarski in the television series Veronica Mars (2006–2007), William "Dell" Parker in the television series Private Practice (2007–2010), Sebastian "Bash" Howard in the television series GLOW (2017–2019), and Jesse Walker in How I Met Your Father (2022-2023). He has also appeared in films, notably Up in the Air (2009), The Help (2011), and Promising Young Woman (2020), all of which were nominated for the Academy Award for Best Picture.

Lowell made his directorial debut with the film Beside Still Waters (2013), which he also co-produced and co-wrote the screenplay for.

== Early life and education ==
Lowell was born in Atlanta, Georgia. He attended the Atlanta International School, where he became interested in theatre and filmmaking. He attended the University of Southern California, where he was discovered in his first year while playing beach volleyball.

== Career ==
Discovered in 2003 after going through his first major audition, Lowell landed the role of Jonathan Fields on the ABC teen drama Life As We Know It. The series was cancelled after 13 episodes.

In 2006, Lowell had lead roles in the coming-of-age film Graduation and also in a small film entitled You Are Here.

After the end of Life As We Know It, Lowell was cast as Stosh "Piz" Piznarski in the third season of Veronica Mars, opposite Kristen Bell and Jason Dohring.

In 2009 Chris Lowell appeared in several videos by the sketch comedy group BriTANicK, including "Pillow Talk", and "The Morning After."

From 2007 until 2010, Lowell appeared in the ABC drama Private Practice, alongside Kate Walsh, Audra McDonald, and Tim Daly, playing Dell, the receptionist for the Oceanside Wellness Group who was also a qualified nurse, midwife-in-training, and young father to six-year-old daughter Betsy. Lowell exited Private Practice in the show's third-season finale when Dell died from heart failure, a complication during brain surgery after a vehicle accident.

In 2011, Lowell played the role of Stuart Whitworth in the film The Help, an adaptation of Kathryn Stockett's 2009 novel of the same name. The following year, filming began on Lowell's directorial debut, Beside Still Waters. Set in Michigan’s Upper Peninsula, the film tells the story of a man redefining his outlook on life after the death of his parents.

Lowell also played Derrick on Fox's 2014 comedy Enlisted.

Lowell is also a vocalist and harmonicist for the indie acoustic band Two Shots for Poe.

He starred in the Off-Broadway hit Jacuzzi at Ars Nova in New York City.

In May 2021, Lowell was cast in the How I Met Your Mother spinoff series How I Met Your Father, led by Hilary Duff. In November 2021, Duff and the cast confirmed via social media accounts that the series would premiere on January 18, 2022. On February 15, 2022, Hulu renewed the series for a 20-episode second season. He played the role of producer Sebastian “Bash” Howard in the 2017-19 Netflix series GLOW.

== Personal life ==
Lowell and his wife, actress Kerry Bishé, have a daughter who was born in 2021.

== Filmography ==
=== Film ===
Year	Title	Role	Notes
2007	Spin	Delaney	
2007	Graduation	Tom Jackson	
2009	Up in the Air	Kevin	
2011	The Help	Stuart Whitworth	
2013	Love and Honor	Peter	
2013	Beside Still Waters	—N/a	Director, producer, co-writer
2013	Brightest Star	The Boy	
2014	Veronica Mars	Stosh "Piz" Piznarski	
2016	Complete Unknown	Brad	
2016	Chronically Metropolitan	Victor	
2016	Katie Says Goodbye	Dirk	
2020	Promising Young Woman	Al Monroe	
2021	Breaking News in Yuba County	Steve	
2022	My Best Friend's Exorcism	Christopher Lemon	
2023	Perpetrator	Principal Burke	

=== Television ===
Year	Title	Role	Notes
2004–2005	Life As We Know It	Jonathan Fields	Main role
2006–2007	Veronica Mars	Stosh "Piz" Piznarski	Main role (season 3)
2007	Grey's Anatomy	William "Dell" Parker	Episodes: "The Other Side of This Life: Part 1", "The Other Side of This Life: Part 2"
2007–2010	Private Practice	William "Dell" Parker	Main role (seasons 1–3)
2014	Enlisted	Corporal Derrick Hill	Main role
2014	Play It Again, Dick	Himself	2 episodes
2016–2017	Graves	Jeremy Graves	Main role
2017	Halt and Catch Fire	Donna's one-night-stand	Episode: "So It Goes"; uncredited
2017–2019	GLOW	Bash Howard	Recurring (seasons 1–2); main (season 3), 25 episodes
2019	iZombie	Byron Deceasey	Episode: "All's Well That Ends Well"
2022–2023	How I Met Your Father	Jesse	Main role
2022	Inventing Anna	Noah	2 episodes
2022	Roar	Detective Chris Durst	Episode: "The Woman Who Solved Her Own Murder"

=== Theater ===
Year	Title	Role	Venue	Notes
2015	Jacuzzi	Bo	Ars Nova	
2015	Kinship	"He"	Williamstown Theater Festival	
2018	Barefoot in the Park	Paul Bratter	Old Globe Theatre	
2019	Nassim	Performer	Barrow Street Theatre	
2024	Cult of Love	James Bennett	Berkeley Repertory Theatre	
2024	Cult of Love	James Bennett	Hayes Theater	
2025	Marjorie Prime	Young Walter/Walter Prime	Hayes Theater	

== Accolades ==
Award	Year	Category	Work	Result
Austin Film Festival	2013	Narrative Competition	Beside Still Waters	Won
Black Film Critics Circle	2011	Best Ensemble	The Help	Won
Critics' Choice Awards	2011	Best Cast	The Help	Won
Hollywood Film Festival	2011	Ensemble of the Year	The Help	Won
National Board of Review	2011	Best Cast	The Help	Won
Satellite Awards	2011	Best Cast – Motion Picture	The Help	Won
Screen Actors Guild Award	2011	Outstanding Performance by a Cast in a Motion Picture	The Help	Won
Screen Actors Guild Award	2018	Outstanding Performance by an Ensemble in a Comedy Series	GLOW	Nominated
Screen Actors Guild Award	2019	Outstanding Performance by an Ensemble in a Comedy Series	GLOW	Nominated
Southeastern Film Critics Association Awards	2011	Best Ensemble	The Help	Won
