= Addison Montgomery =

Fictional character

Addison Forbes Montgomery, M.D. F.A.C.S.
- Grey's Anatomy & Private Practice character
- Kate Walsh as Addison Forbes Montgomery in Private Practice.
- First appearance: "Who's Zoomin' Who?" (1.09); May 22, 2005
- Last appearance: "Didn't We Almost Have It All?" (3.25); May 17, 2007 (as series regular) "Strip That Down" (22.10); January 29, 2026 (as special guest star)
- Created by: Shonda Rhimes
- Portrayed by: Kate Walsh
- Season(s): Grey's Anatomy; 1 (guest); 2–3 (main); 4–8 (special guest); 18–19 (recurring); 22 (special guest); Private Practice; 1–6 (series lead)

In-universe information
- Full name: Addison Adrianne Forbes Montgomery
- Title(s): Director of Seaside Health & Wellness; Chief of OB/GYN and Neonatal Surgery at Seattle Grace Hospital (former); MD; FACS; FACOG
- Occupation: Obstetrician-gynecologist at Seaside Health & Wellness; Fetal and neonatal surgeon at St. Ambrose Hospital; Obstetrician-gynecologist at Oceanside Wellness Group (former); Fetal and neonatal surgeon at Seattle Grace Hospital (former)
- Family: Beatrice "Bizzy" Forbes Montgomery (mother, deceased) "Captain" Montgomery (father); Archer Forbes Montgomery (brother)
- Spouses: Derek Shepherd (m. 1994; div. 2006) Jake Reilly (m. 2013; sep. 2026)
- Significant others: Mark Sloan (ex-affair; deceased); Alex Karev (one night stand); Pete Wilder (ex-boyfriend; deceased); Sam Bennett (ex-boyfriend); Kevin Nelson (ex-boyfriend)
- Children: Henry Montgomery (adopted son)
- Religion: Protestant
- Alma mater: Yale University; Columbia University
- Born: 1968

Addison Adrianne Forbes Montgomery, MD, PhD, FACS, FACOG, previously known as Shepherd, is a fictional character who first appeared as a supporting main character on the ABC television series Grey's Anatomy, and as the protagonist of its spin-off Private Practice played by Kate Walsh. Addison is a world-class neonatal surgeon with board certifications in both obstetrics and gynaecology and maternal–fetal medicine. In addition, she has completed a medical genetics fellowship.

Addison initially joined Grey's Anatomy in the Season 1 finale as the estranged wife of Derek Shepherd (Patrick Dempsey). Although she was originally planned as a recurring guest character, creator Shonda Rhimes grew fond of Walsh's portrayal, which led to Addison becoming a series regular by season 2 episode 7, "Something to Talk About". Addison's character played a significant role throughout seasons 2 and 3, with her final appearance as a regular in the season 3 finale, "Didn't We Almost Have It All?". Despite her departure as a series regular, Addison continued to make guest appearances over the next 5 seasons, including a notable two-part guest stint in Season 5.

After the love triangle involving Addison, Derek, and Meredith Grey (Ellen Pompeo) was resolved, Rhimes created the first spin-off of Grey's Anatomy centered around Addison, titled Private Practice. The new series saw Addison move to Los Angeles to start fresh, working at the Oceanside Wellness Group, a fictional private practice in Santa Monica, California. Private Practice ran for six seasons, from 2007 to 2013, airing concurrently with Grey's Anatomy's seasons 4 through 9.

Walsh decided to retire the character after 8 years of portraying Addison, making her final series regular appearance in the Grey's Anatomy universe during the Private Practice series finale, "In Which We Say Goodbye", on January 22, 2013. However, nearly 9 years later, Walsh returned to the role of Addison in a recurring capacity for the Seasons 18 and 19 of the original series.

== Storylines ==
=== Backstory ===
Most of Addison's past is revealed in a non-linear fashion, primarily throughout the second season of Grey's Anatomy and the second and third seasons of Private Practice. Addison comes from a wealthy background and has a $25 million trust fund. Her father, nicknamed "The Captain", is a doctor who teaches medicine at a university, where Addison would watch him as a child. However, her father's time with Addison was often a pretense for his numerous affairs. Her mother, Beatrice "Bizzy" Forbes Montgomery, is also a prominent figure, and her brother, Archer, is a renowned neurologist and a successful author.

Addison met her future husband, Derek Shepherd, in medical school, and their love story began during their time at Columbia University College of Physicians and Surgeons in New York City. Addison is also a graduate of Yale University. During her time in New York, she formed close friendships with Sam and Naomi Bennett, who would later become her colleagues at the Oceanside Wellness Group in Private Practice.

Despite their early connection, Addison and Derek's marriage became strained as they started their medical practices in New York City. This professional life contributed to the growing distance between them. The couple's troubles were further compounded by Derek's family disapproving of Addison, particularly his mother, who gave her deceased husband's ring to Derek's second wife, Meredith Grey. Additionally, Addison's brother, Archer, disliked Derek, which created further tension.

The pivotal moment in their relationship came when Addison had an affair with Mark Sloan, Derek's best friend, further damaging their marriage. Addison briefly tried to build a relationship with Mark, but it quickly fell apart when she discovered she was pregnant and learned that Mark had cheated on her. She decided to have an abortion, still being in love with Derek, and subsequently moved to Seattle in an attempt to repair her relationship with him, which ultimately failed.

=== Grey's Anatomy ===
Addison first appears in the Season 1 finale of Grey's Anatomy, arriving in Seattle at Richard Webber's request. Her initial goal is to reconcile with her estranged husband, Derek, despite his budding relationship with Meredith. Although Derek is still angry with her for her affair with Mark, Addison’s arrival stirs up old feelings, and the couple attempts to rekindle their marriage. This leads to Derek ultimately choosing Addison over Meredith, though he admits that he has fallen in love with Meredith. They try to rebuild their life together, with Addison becoming the head of a new surgical service that integrates neonatal surgery with obstetrics and gynecology.

However, Derek's lingering feelings for Meredith continue to challenge their relationship. Matters are further complicated when Mark Sloan arrives in Seattle to pursue Addison. Mark tells her that Derek is still in love with Meredith, and that he (Mark) genuinely loves her. Addison eventually acknowledges the truth: that Derek’s heart belongs to Meredith. As Derek tries to deal with seeing Meredith move on, he has sex with her in a moment of vulnerability at a hospital foundation gala. When Addison learns about this, she retaliates by having a one-night stand with Mark. Though Mark expresses his desire for a serious relationship, Addison declines, as she recognizes the complexity of her feelings for both men.

In Season 2, Addison initially punishes Alex Karev by placing him on her service after he almost causes her legal trouble. However, as season three unfolds, Addison develops a romantic attraction toward Alex, leading to them sleeping together. Addison quickly realizes that Alex does not want a relationship with her, leaving her feeling even more isolated. Wanting to have a baby, Addison consults her friend Naomi Bennett, a fertility specialist, which introduces the storyline that serves as the backdoor pilot for Private Practice, marking her transition from Grey's Anatomy to the spin-off.

Addison eventually decides to leave Seattle and moves to Los Angeles, where she joins the Oceanside Wellness Group, led by Sam and Naomi Bennett. This officially ends Addison's time as a series regular on Grey's Anatomy, though she makes guest appearances on the show through Season 8.

For reasons unknown, Addison is not present at Derek's funeral. In September 2021, it was announced via social media that Kate Walsh would reprise her role as Dr. Addison Montgomery in Grey's Anatomy's eighteenth season. Addison returned for 3 episodes: "Hotter than Hell," "With a Little Help From My Friends," and "Should I Stay or Should I Go?".

In season 19, Addison returns in five episodes. In episode 3 (Let’s Talk About Sex), Bailey decides to create a series of sexual health videos with the interns and enlists Addison in her efforts. Bailey and Addison take a road trip to a family planning center out of state in “When I Get to the Border”(episode 5). In episode 11, titled "Training Day," Addison returns to Grey Sloan Memorial to assist Miranda Bailey in training new OB fellows. After news of her presence at the hospital spreads online, a large group of protesters gathers outside the clinic due to her work as an OB/GYN. The situation turns violent when a protester throws a brick with the words "Montgomery murders" written on it through a clinic window. Addison helps deliver a baby amid the chaos, but while she and her team are being escorted from the clinic, a protester drives a car into her and a pregnant OB/GYN trainee. Despite the severity of the attack, Addison survives. Episode 12 (Pick Yourself Up) is a continuation of episode 11 with the hospital being placed on lockdown. Addison makes her final appearance on Grey’s Anatomy in episode 16 “Gunpowder and Lead.”

=== Private Practice ===
In the series, Addison is initially made to feel unwelcome by the other doctors at Oceanside Wellness Group, but she decides to stay and work through the challenges. Early on, Addison is attracted to Pete Wilder, the practice's alternative medicine specialist. However, after Pete stands her up on a date, Addison decides to remain friends with him and begins dating Kevin, a police officer she met through work. In a crossover episode, Addison briefly returns to Seattle Grace to assist with a patient and gives Meredith advice not to let Derek slip away.

In Season 2, Addison learns from Naomi that the practice is struggling financially. Despite Naomi’s request to keep it a secret, Addison informs Sam, which leads Naomi to feel betrayed and end her friendship with Addison. This situation escalates when Addison inadvertently prompts the staff to vote between Sam and Naomi for leadership of the practice, and she is surprised when the staff elects her as the new director.

Addison's relationship with Kevin is tested when her brother Archer tells him he isn't good enough for her. Although Addison initially reassures Kevin, the strain eventually causes them to break up. Archer soon begins working for a rival practice, the Pacific Wellcare Center, and when he suffers multiple seizures and believes he has a brain tumor, Addison asks Derek Shepherd to treat him in another crossover episode with Grey's Anatomy. Derek discovers that Archer has parasites in his brain and successfully removes them, saving his life. During this time, Archer begins dating Naomi, putting further strain on the already fragile friendship between Naomi and Addison.

Addison also begins dating a man who turns out to be married to her patient. Despite knowing this, Addison continues to cross the line until the patient calls Addison out on it. Additionally, she discovers that her mother, Bizzy, is a lesbian and has been in a long-term affair with her best friend. Addison had previously blamed her father for his numerous affairs and was unaware of her mother's secret relationship. Though her relationship with her parents becomes strained, Addison ultimately makes peace with them.

As the series progresses, Addison starts developing feelings for Sam, Naomi’s ex-husband. It is revealed that Sam had wanted to ask Addison out back in college, but ended up with Naomi instead. Addison and Sam share a kiss after a traumatic event, and their feelings for each other grow. However, Addison is hesitant to pursue a relationship with Sam because of her friendship with Naomi. Despite these concerns, Addison eventually admits that she loves both Sam and Pete but decides to begin a relationship with Pete while Sam is dating another doctor.

Although Addison and Pete try to make their relationship work, she and Sam continue to harbor feelings for each other, and after Sam becomes single, they kiss again. Pete catches them, but Addison and Pete stay together for a while longer. Naomi ends her friendship with Addison after learning about her relationship with Sam. In the Season 4 finale, Addison has to operate on her godchild, Maya Bennett, after a car accident, which helps mend her friendship with Naomi. Addison eventually breaks up with Pete and finally becomes a couple with Sam. However, their relationship is strained when Addison expresses her desire to have children, while Sam is not ready for that commitment.

After breaking up with Sam, Addison goes on a date with Jake Reilly, a fertility specialist. Although she initially agrees to go to Fiji with him, she ultimately reconciles with Sam. At the start of Season 5, Addison and Sam are back together but break up once more when Sam still refuses to commit to marriage and family. Jake is later hired at the practice, making Addison uncomfortable initially. Jake helps Addison attempt to conceive through IVF, and over time, they grow closer. It is revealed that Jake had a wife, Lily, who struggled with addiction and died of an overdose, leaving Jake to adopt her daughter, Angela. Angela encourages Jake to pursue a relationship with Addison, and despite Addison's unresolved feelings for Sam, she and Jake share several kisses.

Addison’s dream of becoming a mother finally comes true when she adopts a baby boy named Henry. Sam begins to regret leaving Addison and spends more time with Henry, but Addison chooses to focus on her new life as a mother. In the Season 5 finale, Addison and Jake sleep together after Amelia Shepherd delivers a brainless baby whose organs are donated. When Addison returns home, Sam proposes to her, but Jake is also on his way to her house with flowers and Chinese food, leaving her in a dilemma.

In the beginning of Season 6, it is revealed that Addison rejected Sam's proposal and is now in a relationship with Jake. The two eventually move in together, and Addison proposes marriage. Jake initially hesitates but later realizes that Addison is the woman he wants to spend his life with. In a romantic gesture, Jake sets up a candlelit proposal with rose petals, and the two get engaged. In the series finale of Private Practice, Addison and Jake get married, officially starting their new life together with Henry.

== Development ==
=== Casting and creation ===
"I discovered I had endless stories to write for her. Grey's is mainly about young people starting their careers. I realized Kate could anchor a show about people 10 years down the line — what happens if they didn't achieve their dreams, or if they did?"

— Shonda Rhimes on creating a show centered on Kate Walsh's character

Kate Walsh first appeared as Addison on Grey's Anatomy. Initially, the character was intended to appear in only a few episodes, but due to the positive reception of Walsh’s performance, Addison quickly became a regular on the show. Addison's popularity led to the creation of the spin-off series, Private Practice, where Walsh's character moved to Los Angeles to start a new chapter in her life.

In June 2012, Kate Walsh announced on Bethenny Frankel's talk show, Bethenny, that the upcoming sixth season of Private Practice would be her last. Reflecting on her time with the character, Walsh said: "It's been an incredible journey and an amazing ride, and I'm hugely, hugely grateful. It's bittersweet. It's a huge chapter of my life. It's been 8 years." Her departure marked the end of Addison's full-time role in the Grey's Anatomy universe, although Walsh continued to make guest appearances on Grey's Anatomy in later seasons.

=== Characterization ===
Montgomery was initially described as "cold and unforgiving" when she first appeared on Grey's Anatomy . However, as the episodes progressed, it became clear that the writers had "softened" the character, allowing audiences to see a more vulnerable side. Kate Walsh summarized Addison as a "girl you love to hate". Reflecting on Addison’s transition from the first season of Grey's Anatomy to the second, Walsh observed: "She started out so together. Now she's a cat without a whisker — a little off balance and leaving a mess all over the hospital. She's a little untethered now, she's coming unraveled".

Walsh felt that Addison became "stronger" and "more centered" between the first and second seasons of Private Practice. She noted, "Initially she's still getting her footing, still isn't quite sure and a little wobbly, and then you see that she's got her groove back". Walsh further elaborated on Addison’s character, describing her as "flawed and arrogant and really good at what she does. And no matter what happens, she picks herself up and moves on. She keeps trying."

Walsh expressed satisfaction with how Addison’s love life evolved in Private Practice. In Grey's Anatomy, Addison was primarily seen through the lens of the Derek/Meredith/Mark triangle, which often painted her in a negative light. However, in Private Practice, she was given the opportunity to explore more meaningful and reciprocal relationships. "The only thing we saw of her in Grey's Anatomy was the ugly side of the Derek/Meredith triangle. And then, of course, Mark Sloan, but there was no real love there." Walsh explained that her relationship with Kevin Nelson (played by David Sutcliffe) was refreshing and different from her relationships with Pete Wilder (played by Tim Daly) and Derek Shepherd (played by Patrick Dempsey). "It's really fun to see this total other side of her come out that we never saw. It hit me, this little epiphany of like, 'Oh, we've never seen Addison into someone or someone that likes her back'".

== Reception ==
Kate Walsh's portrayal of Addison Montgomery on Grey's Anatomy was highly praised by critics and audiences alike. TV Guide said of her performance: "Kate Walsh kicks butt as Addison, and I hope she sticks around. She adds spice to an already hot show".

However, not all reviews of Addison's transition to Private Practice were initially positive. Joel Keller of AOL TV expressed disappointment with Addison’s evolution during the first season of the spin-off, stating that she "went from strong and funny to whimpering and lovelorn". Keller appreciated Addison's original strength and wit on Grey's Anatomy and felt her character had become more vulnerable and emotionally dependent in Private Practice. Despite his criticism, Keller was pleased to see more maturity and depth in Addison’s Season 2 storylines, noting that the quality he admired most in her—"the ability to perform complicated surgical procedures even while everything in her personal life is in chaos"—was reintroduced.

By the time Private Practice concluded, Margaret Lyons of New York Magazine described the character as "fun" and added: "Even when tragedy befell her at every turn on PP, she was still sort of sassy and bright and interesting." Addison had become a complex, resilient, and beloved character, showcasing both professional brilliance and personal vulnerability. Her lasting impact on television was acknowledged by her inclusion in Comcast's list of TV's Most Intriguing Characters, and Glamour named her one of the 12 Most Stylish TV Characters. Additionally, Addison was featured in Wetpaint's "10 Hottest Female Doctors on TV" and BuzzFeed's "16 Hottest Doctors On Television".

== Awards ==
Walsh’s work on Grey's Anatomy and Private Practice earned her and the cast numerous accolades. In 2006, she was part of the Grey's Anatomy ensemble that won the Satellite Award for Best Ensemble in a Television Series. Additionally, she was also part of the Grey's Anatomy ensemble cast that was nominated for the Screen Actors Guild Award for Outstanding Performance by an Ensemble in a Drama Series from 2006 to 2008, with a victory in 2007. For her role on Private Practice, Walsh was nominated for Favorite TV Drama Actress at the 37th People's Choice Awards.
