= I Am a Tree =

- Grey's Anatomy episode
- Addison Montgomery and Mark Sloan's affair is revealed to Derek Shepherd. The plot point was a popular point of interest among critics.
- Episode no.: Season 3 Episode 2
- Directed by: Jeff Melman
- Written by: Krista Vernoff
- Original air date: September 28, 2006
- Running time: 43 minutes

Guest appearances
- Chris O'Donnell as Finn Dandrige; Diahann Carroll as Jane Burke; Richard Roundtree as Donald Burke; Javier Grajeda as Jeffrey Hernandez; Steven W. Bailey as Joe

Episode chronology
← Previous "Time Has Come Today"	Next → "Sometimes a Fantasy"
- Grey's Anatomy season 3

"I Am a Tree" is the second episode in the third season of the American television medical drama Grey's Anatomy, and the show's 38th episode overall. Written by Krista Vernoff and directed by Jeff Melman, the episode aired on the American Broadcasting Company (ABC) in the United States on September 28, 2006.

The episode focuses mainly on Cristina Yang (Sandra Oh), as her romantic relationship with Preston Burke (Isaiah Washington) is tested through the arrival of his parents. Further story arcs which provided a particular focus on individual characters include Addison Montgomery (Kate Walsh) facing Derek Shepherd's (Patrick Dempsey) desire to divorce her, Izzie Stevens (Katherine Heigl) coping with Denny Duquette's (Jeffrey Dean Morgan) death and the repercussions of her choice to quit the internship program, and Meredith Grey (Ellen Pompeo) struggling with the choice between Derek and Finn Dandridge (Chris O'Donnell). Also dealt with was Miranda Bailey (Chandra Wilson) attempting to have Stevens rejoin the program, Mark Sloan (Dane) arriving from New York City in order to resume his romantic relationship with Montgomery, and Callie Torres (Sara Ramirez) being evacuated from the hospital.

Although the episode was fictionally set in Seattle, Washington, filming took place in Los Angeles, California. The episode is the first to feature Diahann Carroll, who begins a recurring role as Jane Burke, Burke's mother. The installment marked Eric Dane's second appearance in the series and first appearance in the season, despite not being credited. The episode was instrumental in the producers' decision to have Dane promoted to series regular status in the following episode.

Upon initial telecast, the episode was viewed by approximately 20.93 million viewers, ranked second in the time-slot and third for the week and garnered an 8.6 Nielsen rating in the 18–49 demographic, seeing a decrease from the previous episode, which received a 9.0 rating. It received mixed-to-negative reviews from television critics, with Addison's storyline receiving critical acclaim.

== Plot ==
The episode opens to a voice-over narration from Meredith Grey (Ellen Pompeo) about impulses.

Having undergone surgery following the shooting in the Season 2 finale, Preston Burke (Isaiah Washington) received an unanticipated visit from his parents, Jane Burke (Diahann Carroll) and Donald Burke (Richard Roundtree). It is revealed that the main reason for their unannounced arrival is meeting Preston's love interest, Cristina Yang (Sandra Oh). Due to the Burkes' overprotective attitude and strict moral beliefs, Cristina initially fails to impress them, determining a negative outlook on their romantic relationship. Following the exposure of his affair with his former love interest Meredith Grey (Ellen Pompeo), Derek Shepherd (Patrick Dempsey) begins considering and ultimately decides on divorcing his wife. Facing the devastating news, Addison Montgomery (Kate Walsh) abandons her hospital duties for the day, turning to alcoholism as a means to deal with the depression.

Feeling guilty for being the reason her marriage had initially failed, Addison begins questioning her ability to interact with men. Having made up his mind on divorcing Addison, Derek attempts at becoming romantically involved with Meredith once again. Aware of Derek's plans, Meredith begins to question her feelings for Finn Dandridge (Chris O'Donnell), with whom she had previously began a relationship. Unable to decide between what she wants and what she needs, Meredith unwillingly stirs a rivalry between the two men. Now being unemployed, Izzie Stevens (Katherine Heigl) tries to move on after the death of her fiancé, Denny Duquette (Jeffrey Dean Morgan). Realizing that she is unable to do so, she starts using baking as the way to overcome the grief. Miranda Bailey (Chandra Wilson) realizes her decisive role in Denny's death, and begins experiencing strong guilt. Influenced by the recent revelations, Bailey tries to convince Izzie to reenter the internship program, which she had left as a result of her actions leading up to Denny's death. Ultimately, Izzie chooses to attempt at returning to work at the hospital.

Richard Webber (James Pickens Jr.) learns that Callie Torres (Sara Ramirez) is living in the hospital basement, leading to her relocating with George O'Malley (T. R. Knight) in Meredith's house, much to the displeasure of his roommates. A teenager patient with a large branch protruding through his abdomen is admitted into the hospital, and is revealed to have been thrown into a pile of tree clippings while street luging unprotected. The boy's distressed father Jeffrey Hernandez (Javier Grajeda) uses violence in order to make his son realize the danger he has gotten himself into. Alex Karev (Justin Chambers) is assigned to the patient and unwillingly becomes emotionally involved in the case, banning further interaction between the two. Derek, Bailey and Cristina treat a patient admitted in the neurosugical service, who has a tumor pressing against his frontal lobe. His condition forces him to verbally express each thought passing his mind, without being able to control it in any way. Realizing her inability to choose between the two men in her romantic background, Meredith decides on dating both, therefore attempting to compare their dedication towards her.

At the conclusion of the episode, Derek visits Addison in her hotel room, in order to share his final thoughts on their upcoming divorce, but is shocked at the revelation that she had sex with Mark Sloan (Eric Dane).

== Production ==
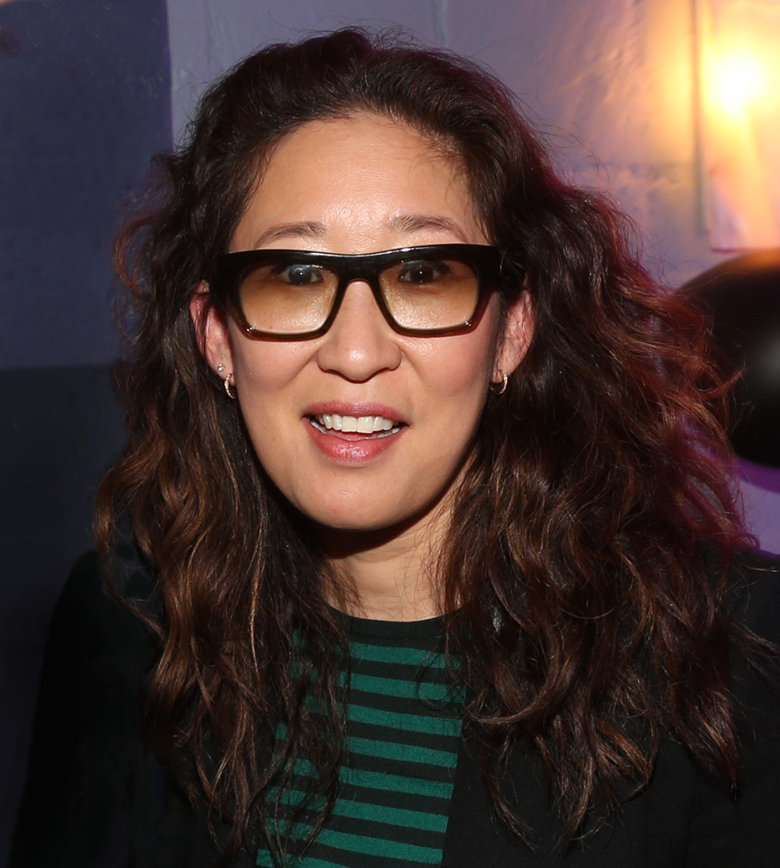
According to episode writer Krista Vernoff, the episode provides a particular emphasis on the development of Sandra Oh's character, Cristina Yang.

"I Am a Tree" was written by Primetime Emmy Award-nominee and series executive producer, Krista Vernoff. Filmmaker and television producer Jeff Melman served as the director, his first such credit since "Blues for Sister Someone" in Season 2. The soundtrack used in the episode included Moloko's "The Time Is Now", The Chalets' "Theme From Chalets", Bitter:Sweet's "The Mating Game", Mat Kearney's "Crashing Down" and Roland Clark's "Open Your Eyes". Also featured in the episode was "Open Your Eyes", the fifth single from the Northern Irish alternative rock band Snow Patrol's album Eyes Open. Similarly to "Chasing Cars", the band's previous single featured in the series, the song gained significant popularity after being used in the show, resulting in a drastic rise in sales on iTunes. Several one-time guest actors appeared in the episode, including Richard Roundtree, who portrayed Donald Burke, and Javier Grajeda, acting as Jeffrey Hernandez. Although fictionally set in Seattle, Washington, filming primarily occurred in Los Angeles, California. Scenes in the operating room were filmed at The Prospect Studios in Los Feliz, Los Angeles.

Following his appearance in the second season, Eric Dane (who plays Mark Sloan) returned to the series in this episode. According to Dane, he was originally hired by the series producers to film one episode but was ultimately asked to return. "As far as I know, I was doing one episode. That's what I signed up for. But because of who the character was, there was a lot of room for him to come back. I got real lucky, they invited me back." When offered the series regular position, Dane was not aware of the character's future on the show, noting the boldness of the character's introduction in the previous season, in contrast to his first appearance in the third season. Fellow cast member Ellen Pompeo (Meredith Grey) offered her insight on Sloan's reintroduction, noting that the inevitability of the character's return was due to his overwhelming popularity, mainly among the female audience, who immediately responded to the concept of the character. Dane only makes a brief, uncredited appearance in this episode, showing his naked character exiting a steamy bathroom. The scene has since become one of the most iconic of the series. Dane offered his outlook on the scene, "It was a spectacular entrance. It was all about this brand new towel, which had a hard time staying together. Every time I put it together and let my hands go, it was almost like throwing caution to the wind."

== Release ==
"I Am a Tree" underperformed compared to the previous episode in terms of viewership. The episode was originally broadcast on September 28, 2006, in the United States, on the American Broadcasting Company (ABC). The episode was viewed by a total of 23.48 million Americans, which represented a 1.93% drop from the previous episode, "Time Has Come Today," which garnered 25.41 million viewers. In terms of viewership, "I Am a Tree" ranked second for the night, just behind CBS's juggernaut CSI: Crime Scene Investigation. The episode did not win in overall viewership, as its 8.2 Nielsen rating ranked second in its 9:00 PM Eastern time slot and for the entire night, particularly in the key 18–49 demographic.

== Reception ==
"I Am a Tree" received mixed-to-negative reviews from television critics upon telecast; however, Addison Montgomery's (Kate Walsh) storyline received critical acclaim.
