= Wishin' and Hopin' (Grey's Anatomy) =

- Grey's Anatomy episode
- The physicians have fainted, due to a patient's toxic blood.
- Episode no.: Season 3 Episode 14
- Directed by: Julie Anne Robinson
- Written by: Tony Phelan; Joan Rater
- Original air date: February 1, 2007
- Running time: 47 minutes

Guest appearances
- Kate Burton as Dr. Ellis Grey; Sarah Utterback as Olivia Harper; Ronobir Lahiri as Robert Hansen; Jasmine Di Angelo as Kellie Hansen; Amanda Collins as Marina Wagner; Matt McTighe as Vincent

Episode chronology
← Previous "Great Expectations"	Next → "Walk on Water"
- Grey's Anatomy season 3

"Wishin' and Hopin'" is the fourteenth episode in the third season of the American television medical drama Grey's Anatomy, and the show's 50th episode overall. Written by Tony Phelan and Joan Rater and directed by Julie Anne Robinson, the episode aired on the American Broadcasting Company (ABC) in the United States on February 1, 2007.

In the episode, Meredith Grey (Ellen Pompeo) struggles with her Alzheimer's-stricken mother, Ellis Grey (Kate Burton), becoming temporarily lucid. Further storylines include Izzie Stevens (Katherine Heigl) and Miranda Bailey (Chandra Wilson) continuously seeking patients for their new clinic, Richard Webber (James Pickens Jr.) dealing with the repercussions of his upcoming retirement, and George O'Malley (T. R. Knight) facing negative response from colleagues on his unexpected marriage to Callie Torres (Sara Ramirez).

Although the episode was fictionally set in Seattle, Washington, filming took place in Los Angeles, California. Burton reprised her role as Ellis Grey in a guest star capacity, in addition to Sarah Utterback, who portrayed Olivia Harper. The title of the episode refers to the song "Wishin' and Hopin'", by British pop musician Dusty Springfield.

Upon its original airing, the episode was watched by 24.18 million viewers in the United States, ranked first in its time-slot, and garnered an 8.5 Nielsen rating in the 18–49 demographic. It received mixed-to-positive reviews from television critics, with Ellis's storyline receiving critical acclaim.

Burton earned a nomination for the Primetime Emmy Award for Outstanding Guest Actress in a Drama Series at the 2007 ceremony.

== Plot ==
The episode opens with a voice-over narration from Meredith Grey (Ellen Pompeo) about extraordinary events.

The Denny Duquette Memorial Clinic has been opened, funded by a US$8 million donation from Izzie Stevens (Katherine Heigl). Four of the hospital's attending surgeons—Derek Shepherd (Patrick Dempsey), Preston Burke (Isaiah Washington), Addison Montgomery (Kate Walsh), and Mark Sloan (Eric Dane)—are all competing for the position of Chief of Surgery after the current chief, Richard Webber (James Pickens Jr.), announces his plans to retire. Meredith visits her mother, Ellis Grey (Kate Burton), at the Alzheimer's care facility, only to discover that Ellis has temporarily regained lucidity but soon faints and is rushed to Seattle Grace Hospital, her former place of employment.

At the clinic, Cristina Yang (Sandra Oh), Miranda Bailey (Chandra Wilson) and Alex Karev (Justin Chambers) await the arrival of patients, while George O'Malley (T. R. Knight) surprises them with the announcement of his sudden marriage to Callie Torres (Sara Ramirez).

A cancer patient, Marina Wagner (Amanda Collins), is admitted and her blood is discovered to be toxic, a result of a chemical reaction between an herbal supplement and chemotherapy. This causes several doctors to fall ill. O'Malley, exposed to the neurotoxin, becomes anxious, fearing his marriage might be the cause of the illness. This storyline is inspired by the real-life case of Gloria Ramirez, a woman whose toxic blood caused illness among hospital staff in California in 1994. In the episode, the "herbal supplement" is speculated to be the cause, while in reality, dimethyl sulfoxide was involved.

Ellis is diagnosed with a heart condition, and while surgery or medication are treatment options, she refuses surgery. Meredith worries about her mother not complying with the medication. Meanwhile, Shepherd and Burke attempt to close Wagner's incision after the OR is evacuated, entering the room in sealed, airtight suits. Ellis agrees to surgery but insists on speaking with Webber, her former lover, first.

A teenage patient is brought into the clinic by her father, seeking guidance on how to use tampons. Once her father leaves, she reveals to Bailey that she had sex, though her pregnancy test is negative. During Wagner's surgery, Shepherd and Burke run out of air, prompting Cristina, Izzie, and Meredith to enter the OR holding their breath to complete the procedure.

O'Malley's colleagues react poorly to his marriage announcement, leading him to defend Torres and lecture them. Mark is seen having sex with Addison, and Cristina agrees to marry Burke. By the end of the episode, Ellis' temporary lucidity disappears, leaving both Meredith and Webber heartbroken.

== Production ==
"This episode was obviously about a lot of things, but for me, it was really about Alzheimer's disease. How devastating it is to families, how it turns spouses and children into caretakers, how it robs people of their memory, their identity."

— Writer Joan Rater on the episode's premise

The episode was written by co-executive producer Tony Phelan and Joan Rater, and directed by filmmaker Julie Anne Robinson. Featured music includes Psapp's "King of You", The Whitest Boy Alive's "Fireworks", Iain Archer's "Canal Song", Miho Hatori's "Barracuda" and Sybarite's "Runaway". Rater shared that she was inspired to write the episode after her husband had to undergo a craniotomy. She explained that the focus of the episode was on Ellis Grey's inner feelings, especially her fright, frustration, and stress: "The concept of someone with this disease having a lucid day is real. The disease varies for everyone, but experts we talked to said that patients have bad days and good days, and then sometimes they have great days where it seems like they are their old selves. Maybe it's a moment, maybe an hour, for some a whole afternoon, but we were fascinated with the idea of getting this time, this gift, and knowing that it's only temporary. What would you do with that one day? And what would it mean for Meredith?" Rater explained, describing the episode's central premise.

She also revealed that the idea of Meredith and Ellis reconnecting had been considered for nearly a year before the episode was written, after several unsuccessful attempts to incorporate the storyline into other episodes. "If you're going to give Meredith her mother back and then take her away again, you'd better have a pretty good reason." Rater emphasized that the episode also marked a new period in the interns' development, as they begin to find their identities as surgeons, shifting the season's focus from earlier storylines centered around Denny Duquette's death and Meredith's love triangle with Derek Shepherd and Finn Dandridge.

Rater noted that Meredith's life, which had just begun to stabilize with her newfound happiness with Derek, is suddenly shaken by her mother's unexpected lucidity. This was written to remind Meredith of the difficult years of her upbringing: "If Meredith is ever going to be happy, she's got to deal with the fact that she had a really terrible childhood." Additionally, Rater explained that Ellis' harsh and hurtful statements towards Meredith were designed to show the roots of Meredith's personal struggles, such as her alcoholism in college and her history of one-night stands with inappropriate men. She praised Ellen Pompeo's performance as "exceptional", particularly in the scene where Meredith finally stands up to her mother, calling it an "exceptional moment."

Regarding Ellis' interaction with Webber, Rater noted that it was the first time Ellis lets her guard down, revealing her vulnerability and expressing her desire for the kind of happiness and normalcy that Meredith has found. She also commended the cast's performances, describing their acting as "remarkable". Rater concluded that the episode's central theme was the importance of cherishing the time we have and loving the people who support us, even when they drive us crazy. "That is really what it's all about. We have to cherish the time that we have here, and love the people who surround and support us, even if they make us crazy, because things happen. Brain surgery, Alzheimer's, and weddings. And the worst thing is to come to the end of your life, and realize, like Ellis, that you should have tried harder," Rater remarked, emphasizing the emotional core of the episode and calling it "not ordinary".

== Release ==
"Wishin' and Hopin'" averaged 24.18 million viewers upon its original broadcast on February 1, 2007, at 9:00 ET, ranking ninth in weekly viewership with an 8.5 rating, according to Nielsen ratings. The episode became the fifth most-watched of the season, airing in the fourth week after the winter hiatus. It showed a significant increase in ratings, attracting 2.68 million more viewers than the previous episode, "Great Expectations", which had a 7.6 rating. "Wishin' and Hopin'" led the time slot, with 2.69 million more viewers than CBS's CSI: Crime Scene Investigation, which ranked tenth with a 7.6 rating.

== Reception ==
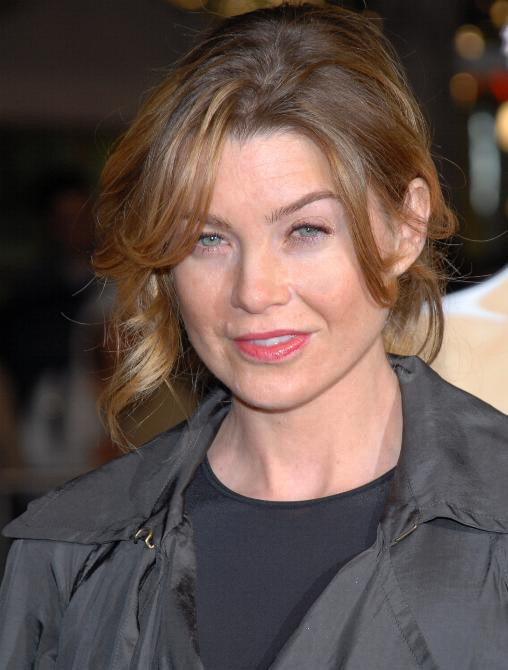
Ellen Pompeo's performance in the episode was praised by series writer Joan Rater, who deemed her "exceptional".

"Wishin' and Hopin'" received mixed-to-positive reviews from television critics upon telecast, with Ellis Grey's (Kate Burton) storyline receiving critical acclaim.

Staci Krause of IGN praised the episode, particularly for its contribution to the season's ongoing arc. She noted that the combination of the cancer patient's toxic blood and Ellis's lucidity created a balance, propelling the show forward "at a lightning-quick pace". Krause described the episode as "stellar", avoiding any significant missteps. Referring to it as "epic", Krause lauded the scene in which George O'Malley realizes the cause of the intoxication: "This is what we come to expect from medical dramas, and it is great to see Grey's get back to this, while not sacrificing the personal stories." Krause highlighted how the medical case "brought out the hero" in many characters, while criticizing Mark Sloan for his lack of appealing traits, calling him "unlikable".

On Sloan, Krause remarked: "The only one who didn't do anything particularly heroic was Sloan. That made his involvement with Addison at the end even better, as it was clear she was using him to satisfy a desire." Krause also praised Ellis's temporary lucidity, calling it "amazing": "She was unbelievably cruel to Meredith, telling her how disappointed she was that Meredith was merely ordinary. Ouch. But she did a great thing too by giving Cristina the answer she was looking for." George's sudden marriage to Callie Torres was deemed a "roller coaster" and a good way to contrast their characters. Krause also emphasized Izzie Stevens' shift from kindness to cruelty, calling it a "highlight" that demonstrated the complexity of the characters.

Kelly West of Cinema Blend echoed Krause's positive assessment, calling it the best episode of the season. West described the episode as an "eye-opening experience", with Ellis' surprising personality having an even greater negative effect on Meredith than her previous controlling nature and disapproval: "You would think after Ellis had a few hours to digest the news that she had essentially lost her mind, she would use her brief lucidity to patch things up with Meredith. But instead, she cruelly criticizes her daughter." West also pointed out that Ellis' personality, when lucid, was far worse than her previous appearances, with her frustration and confusion driving her actions.

"This episode was fantastic on every level. The progression of several of the personal stories and the medical cases both entertained and excited us. It was also a very emotional episode and we had tears welling up in several scenes. There really wasn't one aspect that needed improving upon. It was practically flawless."

— Staci Krause of IGN

West noted how Ellis' focus on Meredith's career over her love life, and her disdain for Meredith's lack of concern about her medical specialty, explained the deep-rooted emotional issues in Meredith's life: "If this is how she treated Meredith throughout her childhood, it explains why Meredith is so 'dark and twisty'." West praised the realism in Ellis' refusal to undergo heart surgery due to not wanting to continue life in a state of forgetfulness, but she was critical of the conversation between Ellis and Webber, calling it a fabrication designed to give her peace. Finally, West appreciated Miranda Bailey's storyline, describing her as "direct, somewhat stern, but not unkind" in addressing the issues faced by a sexually active teenager.

Variety listed the episode among the Top 10 Most Bizarre Medical Maladies encountered in the series.

== Awards ==
Kate Burton earned a nomination for the Primetime Emmy Award for Outstanding Guest Actress in a Drama Series at the 2007 ceremony for her performance in the episode, though she ultimately lost to Leslie Caron of Law & Order: Special Victims Unit.
