= Time Has Come Today (Grey's Anatomy) =

- Grey's Anatomy episode
- An episodic screenshot displaying Derek Shepherd interacting with Meredith Grey for the first time. The scene was part of a series of flashbacks presented during the episode.
- Episode no.: Season 3 Episode 1
- Directed by: Daniel Minahan
- Written by: Shonda Rhimes
- Original air date: September 21, 2006
- Running time: 45 minutes

Guest appearances
- Chris O'Donnell as Finn Dandrige; Loretta Devine as Adele Webber; Sarah Utterback as Olivia Harper; Kate Burton as Dr. Ellis Grey; Steven W. Bailey as Joe; Elizabeth Goldstein as Giselle Toussant

Episode chronology
← Previous "Losing My Religion"	Next → "I Am a Tree"
- Grey's Anatomy season 3

"Time Has Come Today" is the first episode and the season premiere of the third season of the American television medical drama Grey's Anatomy, and the show's 37th episode overall. Written by Shonda Rhimes and directed by Daniel Minahan, the episode aired on the American Broadcasting Company (ABC) in the United States on September 21, 2006.

The episode primarily focuses on Izzie Stevens (Katherine Heigl) coping with the unexpected death of her fiancé, Denny Duquette (Jeffrey Dean Morgan), while dealing with the decision to quit the internship program. Further storylines include Preston Burke (Isaiah Washington) facing the repercussions of his being shot, and Meredith Grey (Ellen Pompeo) dealing with the aftermath of her affair with Derek Shepherd (Patrick Dempsey), which puts a strain in his already troubled marriage to Addison Montgomery (Kate Walsh).

Although the episode was fictionally set in Seattle, Washington, filming occurred in Los Angeles, California. The recurring characters of Adele Webber (Loretta Devine), Finn Dandrige (Chris O'Donnell), Ellis Grey (Kate Burton) and Olivia Harper (Sarah Utterback) were portrayed with guest star billing. The title of the episode refers to the song, "Time Has Come Today", by the soul music band, The Chambers Brothers.

The episode was viewed by 25.41 million Americans in the United States upon its original airing, ranked first in weekly viewership and garnered a 9.0 Nielsen rating in the 18–49 demographic. It received mixed-to-positive reviews from television critics upon telecast, with Heigl's performance receiving high praise.

== Plot ==
The episode opens with a voice-over narration from Meredith Grey (Ellen Pompeo) about the rapid passing of time.

Izzie Stevens (Katherine Heigl) has a mental collapse after the loss of her fiancé, Denny Duquette (Jeffrey Dean Morgan), as she refuses to deal with the repercussions of her decision to leave the internship program, by lying on the bathroom floor. Cristina Yang (Sandra Oh), Alex Karev (Justin Chambers) and George O'Malley (T. R. Knight) support Izzie during her grieving, becoming influential in her recovering. Addison Montgomery (Kate Walsh) finds Meredith's underwear in Derek Shepherd's (Patrick Dempsey) shirt, and finds difficulty in conceiving a future for their already troubled marriage. Meredith unwillingly finds herself in a love triangle involving Derek and Finn Dandridge (Chris O'Donnell). Richard Webber's (James Pickens Jr.) wife, Adele Webber (Loretta Devine), gives him an ultimatum after spending the night in his office, giving him a choice between his career as a surgeon and his marriage to her. Preston Burke (Isaiah Washington) faces the aftermath of being shot, which leads to him experiencing hand tremors that could lead to his giving up cardiothoracic surgery.

An infant with a severe heart condition is admitted in neonatology, and is revealed to have been abandoned in a schoolyard by his biological mother, whose identity lies between four pre-adolescents. Addison quickly becomes emotionally involved in the case, reliving the feelings she went through after aborting the child conceived with Mark Sloan (Eric Dane). Derek and O'Malley get quarantined after an outbreak at the hospital, due to a patient suspected of having the plague. Their incapacity to leave the hospital leads to numerous confessions between the two, including Derek's reveal of his desire to divorce his wife and reconcile with Meredith. Callie Torres (Sara Ramirez) takes a leave of absence from the hospital, in a continuous attempt to bond with the grieving interns, who do not approve of her relationship with O'Malley. When a patient, Giselle Toussant (Elizabeth Goldstein), is admitted to the hospital, and ultimately dies in Miranda Bailey (Chandra Wilson)'s care, she begins to question her abilities as a surgeon, due to the guilt over the death of both Giselle and Denny, whom she also performed surgery on.

At the conclusion of the episode, Izzie overcomes her grief and gets off the floor, which metaphorically expresses her desire to move on.

== Production ==
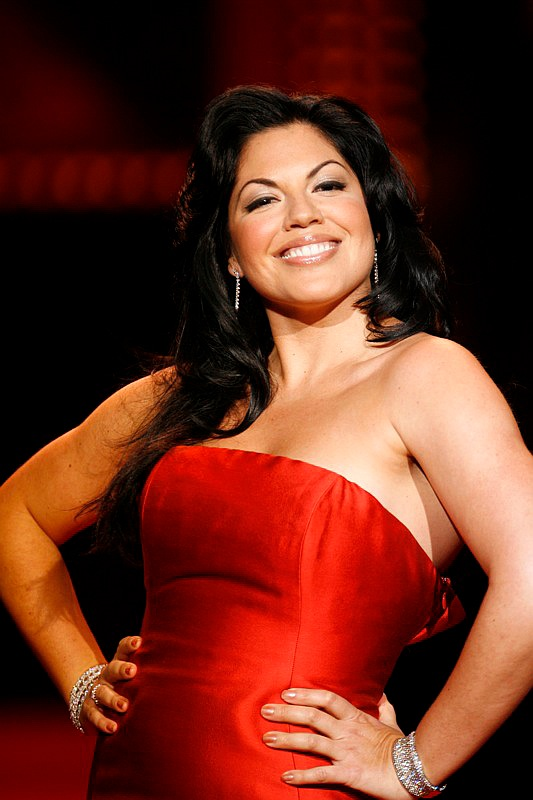
Sara Ramirez (pictured) was upgraded to series regular status in the episode.

"Time Has Come Today" was written by showrunner and executive producer Shonda Rhimes and directed by filmmaker Daniel Minahan. Sara Ramirez (who plays Callie Torres) received star billing beginning with this season's premiere, after making multiple appearances towards the end of the second season. Although the episode is set in Seattle, Washington, filming took place in Los Angeles, California. The Fisher Plaza, home to Fisher Communications and its affiliated KOMO radio and television stations in Seattle, was used for exterior shots of Seattle Grace Mercy West Hospital. This location also provides iconic views of the Space Needle and other Seattle landmarks. However, most exterior and many interior shots were filmed at the VA Sepulveda Ambulatory Care Center in North Hills, Los Angeles, California. Interior hospital scenes were primarily shot at The Prospect Studios in Los Feliz, Los Angeles, occupying two sound stages, with outdoor scenes filmed at Warren G. Magnuson Park in Seattle.

The episode's soundtrack featured music by notable artists, including The Dixie Chicks ("Lullaby"), Tegan and Sara ("Take Me Anywhere"), Sleeping at Last ("Quicksand"), Emilíana Torrini ("Nothing Brings Me Down"), Gnarls Barkley ("Gone Daddy Gone"), Grant-Lee Phillips ("Under the Milky Way"), and Mat Kearney ("All I Need"). Showrunner Rhimes shared that the concept of the episode was to take the story in unexpected directions to keep the series fresh for the new season. Initially, Rhimes planned to set the timeline three months after the previous season's finale but ultimately chose to continue immediately from where it left off, believing that viewers deserved to see the aftermath of the dramatic events. Rhimes also emphasized the role of Meredith Grey's underwear in the episode, symbolizing her character's emotional state and unresolved relationship issues, noting that it became a key element in developing her storyline.

Prior to the episode's broadcast, Rhimes remarked on how it balanced addressing the aftermath of significant recent events while delving deeper into the characters' pasts. She described the episode as the beginning of a new chapter, allowing the show to bid farewell to Denny Duquette (Jeffrey Dean Morgan) while also advancing the ongoing Meredith-Derek-Addison-Finn love rectangle. Rhimes stressed that, in keeping with the show's realistic approach, no storyline would be tied up neatly, reflecting the complexities of life.

== Release ==
"Time Has Come Today" was originally broadcast on September 21, 2006, at 9:00 PM ET, and averaged 25.41 million viewers, according to Nielsen ratings. This episode marked the show's third most-watched installment of the season, airing during the first week of the seasonal prime-time schedule. It ranked first in weekly viewership with a 9.0 rating and attracted approximately 2.91 million more viewers than the previous season finale, which garnered 22.50 million viewers and an 8.0 rating. In addition, it led the time slot against CBS's juggernaut CSI: Crime Scene Investigation, which ranked third for the week with an 8.0 rating and 22.57 million viewers.

== Reception ==
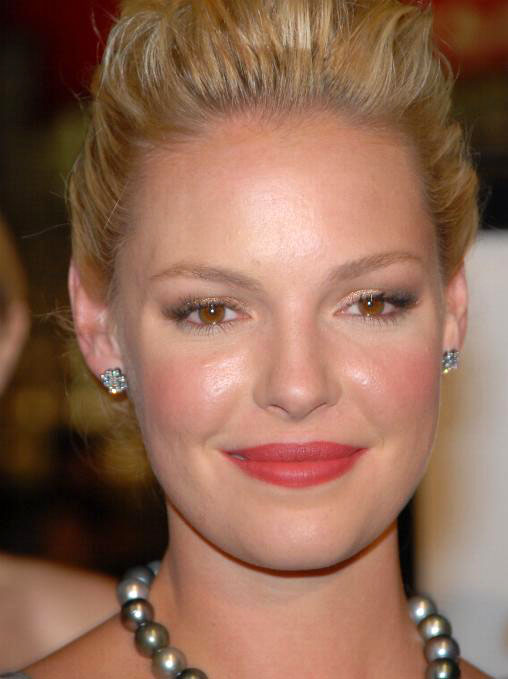
Katherine Heigl's performance as Izzie Stevens in the episode received high critical acclaim.

"Time Has Come Today" received mixed-to-positive reviews from television critics upon telecast, with Katherine Heigl (Izzie Stevens)'s performance receiving high praise.

Oscar Dahl of BuddyTV praised the show's dialogue and character interactions but was critical of its emotional excess. While Dahl noted that some scenes were overly dramatic and not reflective of real-life subtlety, he commended the cast's performances, especially calling the dialogue "smartly written" and effective for character development. Dahl did find the heavy focus on emotions to be "off-putting" at times, but he highlighted Heigl and Ellen Pompeo's (Meredith Grey) performances as standouts.

Robert Rorke of the New York Post was more critical of Meredith's storyline, stating that her character had lost some of her charm, becoming "dopey" due to her romantic entanglements. In contrast, Rorke praised Izzie Stevens' character, describing her as the "heart and soul" of the series, due to the episode mostly focusing on the events that come to define her as a person. He noted that Izzie's storyline provided emotional depth and continuity, especially in the wake of her fiancé Denny Duquette's (Jeffrey Dean Morgan) death, making her more prominent than the series' titular character.

Abigail Chao of Television Without Pity provided a more positive take, particularly enjoying the flashback sequences and the character interactions that highlighted the deep bond among the interns. Chao also found Addison Montgomery's (Kate Walsh) reaction to Meredith's misplaced underwear hilarious and described Miranda Bailey's (Chandra Wilson) encounter with a quarantined patient as emotionally resonant. However, Chao echoed criticisms of Meredith's love rectangle, considering it unrealistic but still appreciating the "lovely" interactions between the four characters involved.
