= Losing My Religion (Grey's Anatomy) =

- Grey's Anatomy episode
- Izzie Stevens crying on Denny Duquette, as Alex Karev tries to calm down the former. Stevens's dress was a source of critical analysis.
- Episode no.: Season 2 Episode 27
- Directed by: Mark Tinker
- Written by: Shonda Rhimes
- Original air date: May 15, 2006
- Running time: 49 minutes

Guest appearances
- Jeffrey Dean Morgan as Denny Duquette; Sara Ramirez as Dr. Callie Torres; Chris O'Donnell as Dr. Finn Dandrige; Loretta Devine as Adele Webber; Brooke Smith as Dr. Erica Hahn; Sarah Utterback as Olivia Harper; Tessa Thompson as Camille Travis; Hallee Hirsh as Claire; Tiffany Hines as Natalie

Episode chronology
← Previous "Deterioration of the Fight or Flight Response"	Next → "Time Has Come Today"
- Grey's Anatomy season 2

"Losing My Religion" is the twenty-seventh episode and the season finale of the second season of the American television medical drama Grey's Anatomy, and the show's 36th episode overall. Written by Shonda Rhimes and directed by Mark Tinker, the episode originally aired on May 15, 2006, on American Broadcasting Company (ABC), as part of a two-hour season finale event alongside "Deterioration of the Fight or Flight Response".

The show follows a group of young doctors in training, and in this episode, Izzie Stevens (Katherine Heigl) and her fellow interns are tasked with planning a prom for Richard Webber (James Pickens Jr.) niece, Camille Travis (Tessa Thompson). Other major storylines include Preston Burke (Isaiah Washington) recovering from his gunshot wound and the emotional fallout following Denny Duquette's (Jeffrey Dean Morgan) death after his seemingly successful heart transplant.

This episode marked Sara Ramirez's (Callie Torres) final appearance as a recurring character, as she would be promoted to series regular in Season 3. Several guest stars reprised their roles, including Morgan, Thompson, Brooke Smith, Sarah Utterback, Loretta Devine, and Chris O'Donnell, while Hallee Hirsh and Tiffany Hines made their first and only appearances.

Upon its initial airing, the episode was watched by 22.50 million viewers in the U.S., achieving an 8.0/22 Nielsen rating/share in the 18–49 demographic. It ranked fifth for the week in overall viewership and was the second highest-rated drama of the week. The episode received mixed reviews from critics upon telecast, with Cristina Yang's (Sandra Oh) storyline and Heigl's performance as Izzie being highly praised, while the storyline involving Meredith Grey (Ellen Pompeo) and Derek Shepherd (Patrick Dempsey) receiving criticism, particularly due to the lack of consequences for the interns. However, retrospective analyses – on numerous occasions – eventually referred "Losing My Religion" as one of the best episodes of Grey's Anatomy.

== Plot ==
Derek Shepherd (Patrick Dempsey) and Richard Webber (James Pickens Jr.) complete Preston Burke's (Isaiah Washington) surgery to repair a pseudo-aneurysm in his subclavian artery, caused by a gunshot wound, which had jeopardized the functioning of his arm. Simultaneously, Erica Hahn (Brooke Smith) successfully performs a heart transplant on Denny Duquette (Jeffrey Dean Morgan). Meanwhile, the interns are ordered by Webber to organize a prom for his dying niece, Camille Travis (Tessa Thompson), until the one responsible for cutting Denny's left ventricular assist device (LVAD) wire confesses. Under the guidance of Camille's friends, Claire (Hallee Hirsh) and Natalie (Tiffany Hines), the interns prepare the prom while grappling with their own personal issues. Burke begins to notice a tremor in his right hand as he recovers from his injury.

Meredith Grey (Ellen Pompeo) learns from Finn Dandrige (Chris O'Donnell), the vet for Doc, the dog she shares with Derek, that Doc has had several seizures due to his bone cancer, and she and Derek must make a difficult decision. Webber questions the interns individually about the LVAD wire, but only uncovers more about their personal struggles. Izzie Stevens (Katherine Heigl) accepts Denny's marriage proposal. At Finn's office, Meredith, Derek, and Addison Montgomery (Kate Walsh) come together to decide to euthanize Doc.

As hospital staff begin arriving at the prom, Callie Torres (Sara Ramirez) and George O'Malley (T. R. Knight) have a discussion about their relationship, with Callie admitting her love and commitment. During the dance, Meredith and Derek sneak away from Finn and Addison for a heated argument that ultimately leads to them having sex. Meanwhile, as Denny waits for Izzie in his room, he experiences a sudden pain and tragically dies. Miranda Bailey (Chandra Wilson) informs Webber of Denny's death while he reflects on his career in the OR gallery.

The news of Denny's death spreads, and the interns rush to his room to find a devastated Izzie, lying beside his body in shock. As they try to comfort her, the cause of death is revealed to be a blood clot that caused a fatal stroke. Izzie blames herself for taking too long to get dressed, believing she could have been with Denny in his final moments if she had acted faster. Alex Karev (Justin Chambers) steps in, gently picking her up and holding her as she breaks down.

Elsewhere, Cristina Yang (Sandra Oh), uncertain about how to support Burke, goes to his room and silently places her hand on his in a gesture of solidarity. In a pivotal moment, Izzie confesses to Webber that she was the one who cut Denny's LVAD wire, and overwhelmed by guilt, she declares that she can no longer be a surgeon, quitting the program.

As the episode comes to a close, Meredith remains torn between her two love interests—Derek and Finn—and faces a crucial decision about who to follow.

== Production ==
"Losing My Religion" was written by series creator Shonda Rhimes and directed by filmmaker Mark Tinker, with Ed Ornelas handling editing. It marked the last episode to feature Sara Ramirez as a guest star, as they would begin receiving star billing in the Season 3 premiere. The episode featured recurring performances by Ramirez (Torres), Jeffrey Dean Morgan (Denny Duquette), Tessa Thompson (Camille Travis), Brooke Smith (Erica Hahn), Sarah Utterback (Olivia Harper), Loretta Devine (Adele Webber) and Chris O'Donnell (Finn Dandrige), while Hallee Hirsh and Tiffany Hines made their first and only appearances as Claire and Natalie, respectively.

The soundtrack for the episode included Pete Droge's "Under the Waves", Dressy Bessy's "Side 2", Amos Lee's "Colors", Masha Qrella's "Destination Vertical", Kate Havnevik's "Grace", and Snow Patrol's "Chasing Cars". The use of "Chasing Cars" notably increased the American profile of Snow Patrol, with lead singer Gary Lightbody initially hesitant about licensing the song but later acknowledging the positive impact the publicity had on the band.

Rhimes titled the episode "Losing My Religion" because she felt that each intern in the episode experiences a profound moment of letting go. According to Rhimes, "George lets go of loving Meredith. Cristina lets go of her well-checked emotions. Izzie is forced to let go of her idealism, and that leads to her letting go of medicine. Alex lets go of his rage against Izzie. And Meredith... well, Meredith just lets go." The costumes for the prom were designed by Mimi Melgaard, with everyone dressed in dark, somber tones, except for Izzie, who wore a pink dress by Amsale.

The episode also featured a unique narrative technique where monologues by the five main characters were used. Rhimes commented that this approach was new for the series and that she was uncertain if it would work. However, the actors brought depth and emotion to their characters' dialogues, which added richness to the episode. The prom theme was something Rhimes had wanted to incorporate since the beginning of the season.

== Release ==
"Losing My Religion" originally aired on May 15, 2006, in the United States on the American Broadcasting Company (ABC), alongside the episode "Deterioration of the Fight or Flight Response" as part of a two-hour season finale. The episodes were watched by a total of 22.50 million viewers, a slight decrease from the previous night's episode, "17 Seconds", which had 22.60 million viewers. The episode earned an 8.0/22 Nielsen rating/share in the 18–49 demographic, ranking fifth for the week in terms of viewership and registering as the week's second highest-rated drama. Its ratings outperformed CBS's The New Adventures of Old Christine and CSI: Miami, the National Broadcasting Company (NBC)'s The Apprentice, and the Fox Broadcasting Company's 24.

== Reception ==
"Losing My Religion" received mixed reviews from critics upon telecast, with high praise for Cristina Yang's (Sandra Oh) storyline and Katherine Heigl's performance as Izzie Stevens; however, Meredith Grey (Ellen Pompeo) and Derek Shepherd (Patrick Dempsey)'s storyline received criticism, particularly due to the lack of consequences for the interns.

Joel Keller of HuffPost expressed mixed opinions, highly praising Cristina Yang's (Sandra Oh) transformation by the episode's end. He praised Callie Torres' (Sara Ramirez) evolution and Katherine Heigl's performance as Izzie Stevens, particularly her prom dress. However, Keller criticized the lack of realism in the interns' punishments, finding the Meredith Grey (Ellen Pompeo)/Derek Shepherd (Patrick Dempsey) storyline tiresome, and described the cliffhanger as a "lame cliché". Maureen Ryan of the Chicago Tribune also gave a mixed review, stating that "overall, the whole thing just fell a little flat". While she appreciated the emotional scene of Doc's death, Ryan was critical of Torres' underdeveloped character, her lack of chemistry with George O'Malley (T. R. Knight), and her prom dress. Abigail Chao of Television Without Pity echoed the criticism of Torres' dress but praised Heigl's pink dress and Alex Karev's (Justin Chambers) support of Izzie after Denny Duquette's (Jeffrey Dean Morgan) death, though she agreed that the Grey/Shepherd cliffhanger was unsatisfactory.

That's the reason I don't watch Grey's Anatomy anymore, because the super hot blond chick can make an earth-shattering, fatal decision and she doesn't get canned.

— Eyder Peralta of The Houston Chronicle

Eyder Peralta of the Houston Chronicle criticized Stevens' ethics for cutting Duquette's LVAD wire, stating that she "should not be practicing medicine". Alan Sepinwall of The Star-Ledger complimented Karev for "finally displaying some humanity" in the aftermath of Duquette's death, but was critical of Shepherd's storyline and the lack of severe consequences for Stevens' dangerous decision to cut the LVAD wire, which he called "insane and dangerous".

Despite the mixed reviews, the episode garnered several accolades. Entertainment Weekly included it in its list of the "25 Sexiest TV Shows on DVD" and "20 Unforgettable Proms". Starpulse also named it among the "Top 10 TV Proms", and AOL TV ranked the Grey/Shepherd hook-up scene in its "Top 20 of TV's Sexiest Scenes". In 2009, TV Guide ranked "Losing My Religion" #63 on its list of the 100 Greatest Episodes, and in 2013, the magazine named Duquette's death as one of TV's Most Heartbreaking Deaths. In December 2011, Wetpaint named the episode one of the 5 best episodes of Grey's Anatomy.
