= Grey's Anatomy season 3 =

Season of television series

Grey's Anatomy
- Season 3
- DVD cover art for the third season of Grey's Anatomy
- Showrunners: Shonda Rhimes; Krista Vernoff
- Starring: Ellen Pompeo; Sandra Oh; Katherine Heigl; Justin Chambers; T. R. Knight; Chandra Wilson; James Pickens Jr.; Kate Walsh; Sara Ramirez; Eric Dane; Isaiah Washington; Patrick Dempsey
- No. of episodes: 25

Release
- Original network: ABC
- Original release: September 21, 2006 – May 17, 2007

Season chronology
- ← Previous; Season 2 Next → Season 4

The third season of the American television medical drama Grey's Anatomy commenced airing on the American Broadcasting Company (ABC) on September 21, 2006, and concluded on May 17, 2007. The season was produced by Touchstone Television channel, in association with Shondaland Production Company and The Mark Gordon Company, the showrunner being Shonda Rhimes. Actors Ellen Pompeo, Sandra Oh, Katherine Heigl, Justin Chambers and T. R. Knight reprised their roles as surgical interns Meredith Grey, Cristina Yang, Izzie Stevens, Alex Karev and George O'Malley, respectively, continuing their expansive storylines as focal points throughout the season. Previous main cast members Chandra Wilson, James Pickens Jr., Kate Walsh, Isaiah Washington, and Patrick Dempsey also returned, while previous guest-stars Sara Ramirez and Eric Dane were promoted to series-regulars, following the extension of their contracts.

The season followed the continuation of the surgical residency of five young interns, as they experience the demands of the competitive field of medicine, which becomes defining in their personal evolution. Although set in fictional Seattle Grace Hospital, located in Seattle, Washington, filming primarily occurred in Los Angeles, California. Whereas the first season mainly focused on the impact the surgical field has on the main characters, and the second season provided a detailed perspective on the physicians' private lives, the third season deals with the tough challenges brought by the last phase of the surgeons' internship, combining the professional motif emphasized in the first season, with the complex personal background used in the second. Through the season, several new storylines are introduced, including the arrival of Dane's character, Dr. Mark Sloan, conceived and introduced as an antagonizing presence.

In a departure from the previous season, the third season aired in a new competitive time-slot of 9:00 pm on Thursdays, competing against the heavily-promoted and highly-rated dramatic television series CSI: Crime Scene Investigation, which simultaneously aired on the CBS Network. Season 3 of Grey's Anatomy contained 25 episodes, in addition to 2 clip shows that were produced to recap the previous events of the show, before the introduction of major new arcs. "Complications of the Heart" aired on the same night as the season premiere, recapping the last episodes of the second season with insights into future episodes in the third, while "Every Moment Counts" aired before the twentieth episode. The season also aired a 2-part episode arc, which primarily served as a backdoor pilot for a proposed spin-off, Private Practice, focusing on the departure of Walsh's character, Dr. Addison Montgomery.

The series ended its third season with an average of 19.22 million viewers per episode and a 6.8/35 Nielsen rating/share in the 18–49 demographic, ranking #8 in the television season, outperformed by CSI. Television critics expressed a mainly negative outlook on the development of the series throughout the season, with the reviews ranging from mixed-to-negative, as exaggeration and lack of realism have been highlighted as the main issues in the declining quality of the storylines. Despite the negative critical response, the performance of the cast members and the production technique of the crew received outstanding recognition through numerous awards and nominations. Earning major category nominations at the 59th Primetime Emmy Awards and the 65th Golden Globe Awards, the season achieved the series' highest number of recipients, with Heigl being the most-awarded cast member. The series was ranked #6 in USA Today's "best of television" list, following the conclusion of the season.

The website Screen Rant ranked the season #5 on their 2023 ranking of the 19 Grey's Anatomy seasons.

== Episodes ==
Each episode of this season is named after a song.

No. overall	No. in season	Title	Directed by	Written by	Original release date	Prod. code	U.S. viewers (millions)
37	1	"Time Has Come Today"	Daniel Minahan	Shonda Rhimes	September 21, 2006	301	25.41
The interns of Seattle Grace Hospital help Izzie cope with the loss of her fiancé, Denny Duquette as well as her decision to quit the internship program. Meredith is uncertain what the future holds after she has sex with Derek and whether he is willing to leave Addison after a marriage of eleven years. Addison finds Meredith's panties in Derek's tux pocket, and realizes that he slept with Meredith. After spending the night in his office, Webber is confronted by his wife, Adele (Loretta Devine). She gives him an ultimatum, forcing him to decide between his career and his marriage. Addison and Alex treat a newborn baby who was found abandoned in a trash can, and they are faced with four minors who could be the mother. George seeks relationship advice from Derek after they are forced to stay under quarantine in the locker room, when Derek confesses his feeling towards Meredith. Bailey gets attached to a patient in isolation whose wife dies, and relives the moments when her husband's life was threatened.
38	2	"I Am a Tree"	Jeff Melman	Krista Vernoff	September 28, 2006	302	23.48
Cristina makes a bad first impression on Burke's parents and is also surprised to find that he is a "mama's boy". Burke's mother believes that Cristina is too selfish and driven for her son, and is only trying to take advantage of his extensive knowledge of cardiothoracic surgery. Izzie uses baking to cope with her grieving, and bakes hundreds of muffins. After pinning Meredith's panties to a bulletin board, Addison takes a day off from the hospital and spends the day drinking. Due to Addison taking the day off, Bailey has Alex help her in the pit, and they're faced with a teenage patient who has been impaled on a tree branch. A brain tumor patient quizzes Meredith and Cristina over their respective relationships. Webber discovers that Callie has been living in the hospital and tells her she has to leave because of hospital policy. Bailey finds the panties on the bulletin board and loses it, demanding to know who they belong to. Callie sees Meredith's embarrassment and takes the blame, which in turn causes George to become jealous, fearing Callie might have cheated on him. A surgical patient lives what may be her last day to the fullest. Meredith must choose between Derek and Finn, and struggles coming to a decision. In the end she tells them both that she would like to try dating them both instead.
39	3	"Sometimes a Fantasy"	Adam Arkin	Debora Cahn	October 5, 2006	303	22.80
Cristina is determined to help Burke overcome his hand tremor and get back into the operating room. Izzie attempts to return to the hospital for the first time since she left the program, but ends up standing in front of the hospital all day, unable to go in and confront Webber. Alex treats a young patient who has a long history of injuries, leading him to suspect abuse. It is discovered that she can't feel pain which makes her believe she is a super hero. Derek and Cristina treat a man who elects to have brain surgery so he is able to look after his child. George gets annoyed at Callie after she moves in with him, resulting in them arguing over a patient. Meredith gets annoyed as both Derek and Finn interrupt the other as they are dating her. Mark is determined to get back together with Addison, but she continuously refuses him.
40	4	"What I Am"	Dan Lerner	Allan Heinberg	October 12, 2006	304	22.88
Meredith's appendix bursts and she is admitted for surgery. Addison works with a pregnant woman who wants to give birth naturally, but needs to have a cesarean section. Addison begins to doubt her abilities as a surgeon after Derek broke up with her; Addison takes Alex off her rotation. Meredith is high from the painkillers and she and Addison speak frankly and apologize to each other. The interns work with a car salesman who wants to get back to his regular routine after he has a risky surgery, however, he lights a cigarette that catches his face on fire. Derek and Mark argue over the best way to treat him, each believing that their specialty is the most important and pressing. Callie breaks things off with George after he stands her up for Izzie, and she later hooks up with Mark. Derek clears Burke for surgery again, but Burke has serious doubts about whether his hand is ready or able to perform surgery again. He keeps his doubts to himself, except to tell Cristina. He practices on a corpse and he and Cristina realize his hand can't perform surgery unless he has help. They decide together to hide the truth by having Cristina assist him in his surgeries. After her surgery, Meredith makes a decision between Derek and Finn, telling Finn that he is a good man and probably a better man, but Derek is "the one". Izzie meets Denny's father, who gives her 8.7 million dollars according to Denny's wishes.
41	5	"Oh, the Guilt"	Jeff Melman	Zoanne Clack & Tony Phelan & Joan Rater	October 19, 2006	305	22.05
The interns are excited to attend their first Morbidity and Mortality conference but their excitement evaporates quickly after finding out Denny Duquette is first on the agenda. Bailey is raked over the coals for letting her interns run unsupervised about the hospital for long durations. Bailey treats a young mother battling breast cancer and realizes that she blames her infant son for everything that had happened to her. Derek and Addison finalize their divorce; Derek gives up most of their property to Addison but later learns that Mark and Addison's relationship was not just a one-night affair and that they kept seeing each other for two months. Addison and Meredith treat a former couple who got stuck inside one another during sex, however, after separating the pair, the man has a heart attack that causes him go into surgery. In the midst of the surgery, Burke's right hand begins to tremble again. Cristina covers for him by asking to practice her running whipstitch. Izzie decides to give up surgery after receiving Denny's check, but she becomes re-motivated after watching Cristina operate. Callie confesses to Meredith that she slept with another man, but doesn't name Mark. Meredith contemplates telling Derek about her break up with Finn, but is hesitant, despite the fellow interns telling her to let him know as fast as she can. George is surprised when Callie tells him that she broke up with him.
42	6	"Let the Angels Commit"	Jessica Yu	Stacy McKee	November 2, 2006	306	21.03
Cristina scrubs in on the rare "humpty dumpty" surgery, much to the envy of her fellow doctors. Bailey wants to scrub in and writes her name on the surgical board as the resident in charge. Cristina erases Bailey's name in order to cover for Burke's hand tremor, which leads Bailey to believe that he was the one responsible for the deletion, leading her to question her talent for surgery and becoming discouraged. Derek receives a surprise visit from his sister and learns that she had slept with Mark, something that threatens their fragile friendship. George and Addison work with a pregnant woman with an unusual dilemma. Mark takes Alex off plastics after he chooses Addison's patient over being on hold at the DMV for Mark, but he later witnesses Mark and Callie discussing their one-night stand. Izzie returns to work but is on probation and is not allowed to talk to patients, perform any surgery, or even go into an operating room. Bailey directs Meredith to be Izzie's boss for the day, and the two treat a patient who may need to be admitted into psychiatry. At the end of the episode, Bailey witnesses Cristina reorganizing the operations board and becomes suspicious.
43	7	"Where the Boys Are"	Daniel Minahan	Mark Wilding	November 9, 2006	307	20.65
Derek invites Burke to join him on a quiet camping trip, but George, Alex, Webber, Joe and Walter come along, ruining Derek's plans. George notices Burke's hand tremor whilst fishing with him, but Burke brushes off George's concerns. Addison and Callie team up to work on a patient but realize that their passion for medicine is not the only thing they share, as they had both slept with Mark and later regretted it. Alex tells George that Callie slept with Mark, and he is unable to accept the truth, even though he and Callie were broken up at the time. Things go from bad to worse when George and Alex fight, and Walter gets injured in the process. Meredith assists Mark on a sex-change procedure as he keeps trying to get her to sleep with him, but complications arise when it's discovered that the patient has breast cancer. Bailey confronts Cristina after realizing that she was the one to erase Bailey's name off the surgery board, not Burke, and finally regains confidence in her abilities as a surgeon. As a result, Bailey takes revenge on Cristina by assigning her to the case of a child who swallowed 21 Monopoly pieces, and keeps her off surgeries until she admits why she took Bailey's name off the board. Izzie has to have a counseling session with Sydney, the perky resident who annoyed the interns when Bailey was on maternity leave.
44	8	"Staring at the Sun"	Jeff Melman	Gabrielle Stanton & Harry Werksman, Jr.	November 16, 2006	308	20.92
Harold O'Malley is admitted to Seattle Grace Hospital, and George's brothers come along and become friendly with Callie. George, however, does not want Callie to socialize with his family, so he assures her that their relationship is over, with no chances of reconciliation. Meredith tries to take things slow with Derek and refuses to have sex with him, while he tries to have a civilized relationship with his now ex-wife, Addison. Derek and Addison confront Webber when they believe he may be suffering from depression. Alex and Izzie help Mark treat a man after he received pectoral implants, and following on from advice from the patient, Alex kisses Izzie after he realizes that he still has feelings for her which are not returned. George and Bailey are on the verge of discovering Burke's condition. Meredith and Bailey treat a five-year old girl, who was accidentally run over by her nanny.
45	9	"From a Whisper to a Scream"	Julie Anne Robinson	Kip Koenig	November 23, 2006	309	18.51
A traumatic car accident which fills the emergency room has everyone challenged emotionally. George calls Erica Hahn from Seattle Presbyterian Hospital to perform heart surgery on his father after he finds out about Burke's condition. George's parents task Izzie with finding out why George had them change surgeon, but this only leads to George snapping at Izzie. Meredith figures out that Burke needs Cristina to operate. Cristina has a crisis of conscience about her deceptive teamwork with Burke, and turns to Webber. Burke is shocked to see that Webber is considering replacing him with Dr. Hahn as the Chief of Cardiothoracic Surgery at Seattle Grace Hospital, but eventually learns that Webber's plan was to make him Chief after his retirement. However, after Cristina confesses about his hand tremor, Webber is forced to warn him about the severe consequences he will have to face. Callie attempts to rebuild her relationship with George. Addison, Mark, and Alex work together on a pregnant woman, and Alex and Addison realize they may have feelings for each other.
46	10	"Don't Stand So Close to Me"	Seith Mann	Carolina Paiz	November 30, 2006	310	24.01
Recent events strain Burke and Cristina's relationship and they both realize that the chances of reconciliation are lowering. Meredith's half-sister, Molly, goes into labor and is admitted to Seattle Grace Hospital under the care of Addison. Meredith does not want to see or talk to Susan, her stepmother, and tells her that she is not family and their relationship should go no further. Harold attempts to discover the cause of George's anger. Derek and Mark must work together when two conjoined brothers seek medical help for separation. However, the patients could become paralyzed or die following the procedure, and Derek is unsure on whether to continue until he gets a pep talk from Bailey. Webber demands that Burke has surgery again to fix his hand. Meredith has to tell her mother that Webber will not keep seeing her and she relives the night that he left her for good twenty years ago. Meredith is devastated when her mother says that she should never have had a daughter as she believes that is the reason that Webber had left her. Cristina faces the wrath of Bailey and the other interns following her part in Burke's scheme.
47	11	"Six Days"	Greg Yaitanes	Krista Vernoff	January 11, 2007	311	23.03
48	12	"Six Days"	Greg Yaitanes	Krista Vernoff	January 18, 2007	312	21.94
Part 1: After a successful heart surgery performed by Dr. Hahn, George's father undergoes surgery to remove the tumor that has spread through his body. Webber and Bailey perform the surgery and do a certain procedure according to Mr. O'Malley's wishes, in spite of their medical opinion. Thatcher Grey visits Seattle Grace Hospital to stay by the side of his daughter Molly, who has just given birth to a girl. Meredith has trouble connecting to him and hesitates in talking to him all day long. Alex works with Addison when the baby needs an emergency surgery, and afterwards they nearly kiss. Derek has trouble sleeping due to Meredith's disturbing snoring as she learns that he had been sleeping on the couch for days. A young girl is admitted to the hospital, suffering from a severe bone condition that is thought to be inoperable. Despite Derek's neurological advice, Callie believes that a certain expensive surgery might be life-saving. Izzie begs to scrub in on a surgery, but Bailey refuses to let her do so until she cashes in her check. Part 2: George learns about the procedure that Webber and Bailey performed on his father which ultimately leads to a worsening of his condition. The O'Malley family now have to face a difficult decision regarding Harold's inability to breathe on his own. They must take him off life support. Meredith finally talks to her father and realizes that her snoring is one of the many things they have in common, despite her inability to admit it. Meredith and Derek continue to argue over her snoring, but the situation is resolved following Meredith's talk with her dad. There's tension between Alex and Addison that eventually leads to them kissing. Addison confesses to Callie that she got pregnant with Mark's son but aborted him after realizing that Mark could never be a good father. Burke lets Cristina know about the status of his condition, but the pair still refuse to talk to each other. Izzie is barred from the girl's surgery after Bailey finds out that she paid for the operation, but she ultimately wins her respect after realizing that without the money the girl could have never been saved. The girl begins a new life as a normal child thanks to Izzie's generous donation.
49	13	"Great Expectations"	Michael Grossman	Eric Buchman	January 25, 2007	313	21.50
After Webber announces his retirement, rumors begin to circulate on his departure and successor. Mark is determined to leave Seattle for good, and irritates Meredith and Alex by making them tend to a patient who will need constant attention but Meredith accidentally gives Mark incentive to stay after letting him know of the open Chief position. Derek is angry at Meredith for causing Mark to remain in Seattle, but soon realizes that she is not the reason he is really angry. The attending physicians at Seattle Grace Hospital fight to get Webber's attention, but he expresses his disappointment in their conduct. He also forces Bailey to get signatures from all the attendings so she can create a free medical clinic, before confessing to her that he thinks she will be Chief one day. Bailey secures the signatures, but has no funding until Izzie offers to spend her entire 8.7 million dollar inheritance on the project. Addison, Izzie, and George treat a patient with a cervical tumor, and Izzie gets worried about George due to his dad having recently died from cancer. Things get more complicated when the patient's Puritan parents arrive. Addison is avoiding Alex following their kiss. Callie and Cristina treat a marathon runner who collapsed after a blackout. George, devastated after his father's death, reunites with Callie and uses sex to overcome his grief, before eventually proposing to her. Cristina and Burke still don't speak to each other, but she eventually breaks, and Burke ends up proposing to her. Webber endeavors to reunite with his wife, Adele, and decides to retire, only to come home and find she's with another man.
50	14	"Wishin' and Hopin'"	Julie Anne Robinson	Tony Phelan & Joan Rater	February 1, 2007	314	24.18
The race for the Chief's position is on, and the attending physicians, Derek, Burke, Addison, and Mark, compete for Webber's affections by trying to help out everywhere possible. The Denny Duquette Memorial Clinic is open for business, but no one shows up. Izzie is disappointed in what she invested Denny's legacy in, and she and Alex team up to steal patients from the emergency room. Callie and George get back from Las Vegas, announcing their marriage, much to everyone's disbelief. Izzie is not supportive of their marriage and tries to get George to realize the mistake he has made. George and Webber treat a patient with cancer, but her blood has a neurotoxin in it that causes all the staff around her to fall ill. The staff have to operate on her in hazmat suits, and later in small bursts to complete her surgery. Cristina doesn't give Burke an answer to his proposal, but after watching him risk his life during the surgery, she agrees to marry him. Meanwhile, Meredith's Alzheimer's-stricken mother, Ellis Grey, experiences a change in her medical condition by becoming lucid for the day. She is disappointed in the mediocrity her daughter has fallen into and begins to despise Derek, blaming him for what happened to the Meredith that used to be "a force of nature". Ellis has to have heart surgery and, despite her mother's wishes, Meredith schedules the upcoming surgery. Webber talks to Ellis and realizes that she is still in love with him, but she loses her memory after their talk ends, before Meredith has the chance to tell her how she really feels.
51	15	"Walk on Water"	Rob Corn	Shonda Rhimes	February 8, 2007	315	25.20
A mass trauma situation, which turns out to be a ferryboat accident, challenges the whole staff of Seattle Grace Hospital. Webber finds difficulty in coping with his separation from his wife and dyes his hair "for the ladies", which becomes an internal joke between Mark, Burke, and Derek. Cristina tries to tell Meredith about her upcoming marriage, but doesn't have the strength to. George promises to find a woman's son, who has been separated from her at the accident. The woman refuses to go into surgery until she is assured that her son is alive. Izzie has to take care of a man who got stuck between two cars on the ferry, but nobody helps her due to the large number of injured people. Alex rescues a pregnant woman with severe wounds on her face, and promises to take care of her. Meredith looks after a girl who has been separated from her mother after the accident and cannot communicate, but while helping a patient, he accidentally pushes Meredith, and she falls into the water, with nobody but the silent little girl as a witness.
52	16	"Drowning on Dry Land"	Rob Corn	Shonda Rhimes	February 15, 2007	316	25.76
Meredith struggles to stay afloat and eventually begins drowning, but nobody is around to notice. Derek finds her coat on a man she had helped, and starts looking for her and, much to his shock, the little girl Meredith took care of indicates that she is in the water. Derek saves her, but she is almost dead, due to hypothermia. The little girl gets reunited with her mother. Izzie has to perform brain surgery on a man stuck between cars, as he begins to experience seizures. She drills holes into his head, to relieve the pressure on his skull and ultimately saves his life before he is rescued and transferred to Seattle Grace Hospital; this leads to Webber allowing her back into surgeries. George lies to the woman whose son he had been looking for, in order to get her to surgery, and eventually finds Callie operating on the son. Alex is unsuccessful in searching for the pregnant Jane Doe's family as she undergoes surgery, and at the same time he also has to deal with the families of the victims. The interns find out about Meredith's situation and express their hopelessness. She wakes up in what appears to be limbo and meets her deceased acquaintances.
53	17	"Some Kind of Miracle"	Adam Arkin	Shonda Rhimes & Marti Noxon	February 22, 2007	317	27.39
Webber struggles to keep Meredith alive, whose body does not seem to respond to treatment, much to Derek's devastation. Meredith is in what she believes is limbo, displaying her interacting with deceased acquaintances whose decision would influence her chances of survival. Cristina remedies her grief for Meredith by leaving the hospital and going shopping, while Alex continues to bond with the pregnant Jane Doe, who remains unclaimed, due to her inability to remember anything. Derek is aware that Meredith is a good swimmer and blames Ellis Grey for her daughter's depression. Ellis goes into cardiac arrest and meets Meredith in the alternate universe, and declares her love and respect for her, telling her to wake up. She does so, and sees everyone who loves her by her side. Cristina lets her know about her engagement to Burke. Addison tells Mark that if he wants to reunite with her, he must go celibate for 60 days.
54	18	"Scars and Souvenirs"	James Frawley	Debora Cahn	March 15, 2007	318	22.68
The race between the attending physicians for the Chief of Surgery position heats up after a new competitor enters the fray. They soon realize that the new surgeon, Colin Marlow, was Cristina's professor in medical school and they used to have a long-term relationship. When Burke finds out about it he realizes that his and Cristina's relationship is on the rocks. George finds out that Callie's family is rich, but she had previously hidden the fact in order to find out whether George loves her for who she really is, which eventually leads to an argument toward the pair. Webber, Callie, and Izzie treat a war veteran with a bullet in his back. Derek treats his former colleague from New York, but they argue over the best care as Derek wants to push a risky surgery, and his colleague doesn't want any more surgeries. Alex continues to work with Jane Doe, whose memory hasn't come back, and later he moves into George's old room. Meredith and Derek have dinner with her father and stepmother. Meredith starts to connect with Susan, but her relationship with Thatcher seems to be irreparable. Izzie wakes up, realizing that she slept with George while they were both drunk.
55	19	"My Favorite Mistake"	Tamra Davis	Chris Van Dusen	March 22, 2007	319	22.30
In the aftermath of Izzie's affair with George, he doesn't seem to remember anything, and Izzie does her best to avoid Callie, but she becomes nervous when she has to help Callie and George treat a patient with FOP. Callie lets George know that they will be having dinner with her father, but George does not make a good impression, being hungover after last night's events. Alex helps Jane Doe choose what her face will look like after Mark performs reconstructive surgery on her. He also gives her a new perspective on how the world will see her from then on. The hospital board begins interviewing the candidates for the Chief's position, and Colin intimidates everyone with his ten-year plan. However, after taking advice from Bailey, Mark seems to have convinced the board that he is appropriate for the job, despite continuous efforts from Derek, Burke, and Addison, whose careers in the hospital outlast his. Cristina looks for a way to save a man's foot when he makes it clear that he doesn't want it amputated. Izzie seeks advice from Addison about her affair, confessing that sleeping with George felt right, despite him being married. Mark takes Meredith as his intern for the day in order to impress Webber, something that Derek doesn't approve of, feeling that Mark has become manipulative.
56	20	"Time After Time"	Christopher Misiano	Stacy McKee	April 19, 2007	320	21.13
When Izzie's daughter, Hannah Klein, is brought to the hospital for leukemia treatment, her adoptive parents come searching for Izzie, and ask her to donate her bone marrow in support. She is saddened to learn that her daughter does not want to see her, but is surprised to see how alike they are. George helps Izzie out, but forgets about a coffee break with Callie. Mark offers to be Webber's wingman, to get him back into dating. Derek comes to the conclusion that his relationship with Meredith is the only thing standing in his way to become the Chief of Surgery. Colin continues to intrude on Burke and Cristina's lives with an impending surgery he will perform. He tries to convince Cristina to break up with Burke, due to their targets being completely different. After realizing that Cristina has changed, Colin drops out of the race for Chief and leaves the hospital. Meredith starts to grow closer to her stepmother, Susan, but they experience a blip when Meredith snaps at her for her constant mothering. A couple arrives at Seattle Grace Hospital to see Ava, whom they initially believe to be their daughter, but the mother rejects Ava without telling her. They leave Alex to inform Ava, causing Ava to lash out.
57	21	"Desire"	Tom Verica	Mark Wilding	April 26, 2007	321	20.08
The interns of Seattle Grace Hospital start to use every free minute to study for their upcoming exam, which will determine their entire residency in the surgical field. Cristina is jealous of George, who can study with Callie, whose learning cards have become legendary. After the realization that George and Izzie might have feelings for each other, Callie decides to give the cards to Cristina. The attending physicians vie for the Chief position by tending to the chairman of the hospital board, after he is admitted as a patient. They soon learn that there is a fish in his urinary tract and learn that his wife has been aware of his affair with his secretary. She eventually resigns and leaves him, and his wife asks for divorce. In the clinic, Izzie treats a patient with a recurring cold, which turns out to be a symptom of something worse. Webber starts to question his decision to retire as he believes that there is a lot more he can do as a surgeon and he cannot be done with his career in his early fifties. Cristina gets annoyed at Burke as he tries pressuring her into choosing a flavor for their wedding cake while she is trying to study. Addison and Alex deliver Ava's baby, through a cesarian-section, before sleeping together, but afterwards Alex tells her to make sure that it never happens again. Derek starts to question his relationship with Meredith, feeling that he is the only one putting an effort for it to work out. George tells Izzie that he is considering transferring to a different hospital.
58	22	"The Other Side of This Life"	Michael Grossman	Shonda Rhimes	May 3, 2007	322	21.23
59	23	"The Other Side of This Life"	Michael Grossman	Shonda Rhimes	May 3, 2007	323	21.23
After things become too complicated in Seattle, Addison travels to Los Angeles to reunite with her old friends from Columbia University College of Physicians and Surgeons. Much to her best friend's shock, the real reason for her visit is in order to get pregnant but she is devastated to learn that she cannot. Whilst there, Addison assists her friend in treating a surrogate mother who had sex with three different men, who all claim that the baby is theirs. Cristina finds difficulty in planning her wedding under the constant watch of her and Burke's mother, who are determined to create an extravagant wedding, despite her wishes of having a small ceremony. Callie is surprised to be invited to be Cristina's bridesmaid. Susan is admitted to the hospital, bringing Thatcher with her, but he suspects that she might be trying to bring Thatcher and Meredith together by faking hiccups. Mark talks to Derek and expresses his disappointment in not working things out with Addison, who he had truly fallen in love with. Burke is surprised when his mother tells him that he's making a mistake marrying Cristina, but she reassures him that she supports his decision. George is determined to transfer to Mercy West, despite Izzie's continuous begging. Addison becomes the temporary obstetrician-gynecologist at the Oceanside Wellness Center in Los Angeles and deals with the aftermath of the discovery that she cannot have children. She is comforted by Pete Wilder, who flirts with and eventually kisses her. The doctors offer her a position, but she denies it after realizing that Seattle is where her life is. The Los Angeles team also continue to treat a man with no sex drive, which infuriates his wife, who has a high one. After Susan returns to the hospital with chest pain, she is rushed into emergency surgery and ultimately dies. Thatcher is devastated by the news and blames Meredith for her death and slaps her. George and Burke confide in each other about their relationship problems, and Burke's intensify after an argument with his mother. Izzie finds difficulty in accepting that George is going to transfer because of her but realizes that she can't deny her feelings towards him, which leads to them kissing. Meanwhile, Derek must perform surgery on Ava and she gets her hopes high after realizing that she might get her memory back.
60	24	"Testing 1-2-3"	Christopher Misiano	Allan Heinberg	May 10, 2007	324	19.58
The five interns finally have to face one of the biggest tests of their careers, which will influence the rest of their lives as surgeons. Meredith is still feeling guilty about her stepmother's death, but feels confident that she will pass the exam, despite warnings from both Cristina and Richard. However, after her father, Thatcher, causes a scene at the hospital, Meredith finds herself unable to focus and doesn't write anything on the exam paper. Meanwhile, George gets accepted in the Mercy West Hospital surgical residency program and has to face a decision which will change his relationship with Izzie forever. Callie's suspicions of her husband's unfaithfulness grow, and she is thrilled about George's transfer to a different hospital. Alex learns that Ava's memory has come back, but he becomes infuriated with her after learning that she is not willing to let her family know where she is. Bailey realizes that Callie's chances of becoming Chief Resident have increased considerably, while Burke cannot get Cristina to talk to him about their upcoming wedding. The attending physicians work with three injured mountain climbers who left their friend behind in order to save their own lives. Derek continues to feel pushed out by Meredith, and at Burke's stag party he flirts with another woman. Joe and his boyfriend consider adopting a baby, but things go bad for them when their surrogate mother collapses. Addison makes the shocking discovery that Adele, Webber's wife, is pregnant. Webber eventually bumps into her, but Adele hides in the ladies' bathroom, and when he finally enters he finds her collapsed on the floor.
61	25	"Didn't We Almost Have It All?"	Rob Corn	Tony Phelan & Joan Rater	May 17, 2007	325	22.57
The mountain climbers lie about the axe in their friend's head, telling Derek that it accidentally got there. During surgery, he and George discover that it was deliberately put there, and one of the climbers admits that he was trying to "put him out of his misery". Adele is stabilized following her collapse, but she soon suffers a miscarriage. Webber learns Adele was actually pregnant with his son, not someone she had a one night stand with. Bailey is disappointed to see that Callie is the new Chief Resident and begins to question her abilities as a surgeon. Callie tells George she wants a baby. Webber chooses Derek as Chief of Surgery, but he refuses, telling Webber that he should continue. Ava's husband shows up at the hospital to find her, but when he's gone, Ava confesses to Alex that she wants to be with him, but he turns her down. Cristina and Burke's wedding day arrives, but Cristina won't stay out of the hospital. However, Cristina's nervousness results in Burke realizing that he does not love the real Cristina, and leaving her. Meredith and Derek are uncertain about their future. George fails his internship exam.

== Cast and characters ==
=== Main ===
- Ellen Pompeo as Dr. Meredith Grey
- Sandra Oh as Dr. Cristina Yang
- Katherine Heigl as Dr. Izzie Stevens
- Justin Chambers as Dr. Alex Karev
- T. R. Knight as Dr. George O'Malley
- Chandra Wilson as Dr. Miranda Bailey
- James Pickens Jr. as Dr. Richard Webber
- Kate Walsh as Dr. Addison Montgomery
- Sara Ramirez as Dr. Callie Torres
- Eric Dane as Dr. Mark Sloan
- Isaiah Washington as Dr. Preston Burke
- Patrick Dempsey as Dr. Derek Shepherd

=== Recurring ===
- Chyler Leigh as Dr. Lexie Grey
- Brooke Smith as Dr. Erica Hahn
- Kate Burton as Ellis Grey
- Chris O'Donnell as Finn Dandridge
- Steven W. Bailey as Joe, the Bartender
- Kyle Chandler as Dylan Young
- Jeffrey Dean Morgan as Denny Duquette

=== Notable guests ===
- Elizabeth Reaser as Rebecca "Ava" Pope
- Loretta Devine as Adele Webber
- Sarah Utterback as Olivia Harper
- Héctor Elizondo as Carlos Torres
- Kali Rocha as Sydney Heron
- Mitch Pileggi as Lawrence Jennings
- Roger Rees as Colin Marlowe
- Jeff Perry as Thatcher Grey
- Mare Winningham as Susan Grey
- Debra Monk as Louise O'Malley
- George Dzundza as Harold O'Malley
- Tim Griffin as Ronny O'Malley
- Greg Pitts as Jerry O'Malley
- Robin Pearson Rose as Patricia Murphy
- Elisabeth Moss as Nina Rogerson
- Embeth Davidtz as Nancy Shepherd
- Monica Keena as Bonnie Crasnoff
- Nicole Cummins as Paramedic Nicole
- Anna Maria Horsford as Elizabeth Fallon
- Abigail Breslin as Megan Clover
- Mae Whitman as Heather Douglas
- Tsai Chin as Helen Yang
- Diahann Carroll as Jane Burke
- Amy Brenneman as Violet Turner
- Paul Adelstein as Cooper Freedman
- Tim Daly as Pete Wilder
- Chris Lowell as Dell Parker
- Taye Diggs as Sam Bennett
- Merrin Dungey as Naomi Bennett

== Production ==
=== Crew ===
This season is the last to be produced by ABC Studios under title of Touchstone Television, as the company's decision to change its name occurred after the conclusion of the season. Shonda Rhimes returned as the series' showrunner and executive producer. She also continued her position from the first 2 seasons as one of the most prominent members of the writing staff. Betsy Beers, Mark Gordon and Rob Corn also returned as executive producers, along with Mark Wilding, Peter Horton and Krista Vernoff, who have been in this position since the inception of the series. Allan Heinberg, however, joins the production team at the beginning of the third season as a co-executive producer, before his promotion to an executive. Kent Hodder, Nancy Bordson and Steve Mulholland served as executive producers for 4 episodes during the season. Horton left the series at the conclusion of the season, whereas James D. Parriott, who previously served a writer and executive producer for the first 2 seasons, did not continue his work on the show during this season. Joan Rater and Tony Phelan continued to serve as co-executive producers, with Rater being a supervising producer as well. Stacy McKee, who previously served as a producer and writer for the series, was promoted to co-executive producer.

After having written 3 episodes for the first season and 5 for the second, Rhimes returned as a writer for 6 episodes, out of which one was written along with Marti Noxon. Krista Vernoff, Tony Phelan, Stacy McKee and Mark Wilding returned to the series as members of the writing staff, with Vernoff and Phelan writing 3 episodes and McKee and Wilding producing the script of 2 episodes. Gabrielle Stanton and Harry Werksman, Jr. worked together for the writing of 1 episode, after 3 episodes they have written for the series in the past. The season includes the first episode to be written by Debora Cahn, who would become one of the series' main writers, as well as a consulting and supervisor producer. Other writers include Kip Koenig, Carolina Paiz, Eric Buchman, Joan Rater and Chris Van Dusen. Rob Corn returned to the series to direct 3 episodes for the season, after writing 2 episodes in the second season. Greg Yaitanes is credited for directing 2 episodes during the season, the only ones to have been directed by him in the series. Other prominent directors were Jeff Melman, Michael Grossman, Julie Anne Robinson and Adam Arkin, each directing 2 or more episodes during the season. Danny Lux continued his position as the main music composer for the series, while Herbert Davis and Walt Fraser served as the season's cinematography directors. Susan Vaill and Edward Ornelas resumed their positions as editors, seeing David Greenspan, Matthew Ramsey and Avi Fisher being added to the team. Fisher, however, left the series at the conclusion of the season.

=== Writing and filming ===
"Whatever I come up with, she is always game to play. She's been so good at what she's done that I've just let the character do what I've wanted the character to do, which has been wonderful. She's managed to sell every single thing because she's really believed it. The incredible thing is that you can have no fear to write what you think because she is always able to deliver."

— Executive producer Betsy Beers on Ellen Pompeo's portrayal of character Meredith Grey

The season was primarily filmed in Los Angeles, California. Fisher Plaza, which is the headquarters building for the media company Fisher Communications and Fisher's ABC-affiliated Komo radio and television stations for Seattle, is used for some exterior shots of Seattle Grace Mercy West Hospital, such as air ambulances landing on the Komo Television newscopter's helipad. This puts Seattle Grace conveniently close to the Space Needle, which is directly across the street from Fisher Plaza, the Seattle Monorail, and other local landmarks. However, the hospital used for most other exterior and many interior shots is not in Seattle, are shot at the VA Sepulveda Ambulatory Care Center in North Hills, California. Most scenes are primarily taped in Los Feliz, Los Angeles, at the Prospect Studios, and the set occupies 2 stages, including the hospital pieces, but some outside scenes are shot at the Warren G. Magnuson Park in Seattle. Several props used are genuine medical supplies, including the MRI machine. Before the production of the season officially began, producer Shonda Rhimes stated that she was planning a major development in Ellen Pompeo's character, Meredith Grey.

"There's a spirit there that's just very interesting to me. She was charming and there was something about her so intriguing to watch", stated Rhimes in response to Pompeo's portrayal of her character. Executive producer Betsy Beers stated that the writing staff was going to focus on the balance between her vulnerability and her courage, also dealing with changes in the relationship with her friends. Pompeo noted that the uncertainty of her character's fate is what helped her evolve into a more adaptable actor. Rhimes also disclosed that an episode with Ellis Grey's unexpected lucidity and eventual death was in plans since the beginning of the series. Rhimes described how Pompeo got through the challenge of sending Meredith in the afterlife: "It was an exciting place to take her. Exciting to watch her find her way back." In response to Izzie's arc, Shonda Rhimes discussed the impact Denny Duquette's death will have on her, noting that Izzie is forced to abandon her idealism, which in turn leads to her letting go of medicine. In the aftermath of Denny's death, Katherine Heigl came to believe that Izzie was not cut out to be a doctor. Executive producer Betsy Beers explained, however, that Denny's death served to make Izzie more mature, and Heigl affirmed that "At the beginning of the third season, they were trying to show how lost Izzie was. She lost her optimism. She realizes now that life is difficult, but she still tries very hard to see the best in people."

Creator Shonda Rhimes compared what she deemed the two "most iconic moments of the season", describing how the season begins with Izzie lying in the prom dress on the bathroom, and ends with Cristina standing motionless in her wedding dress. Cast member Eric Dane described the impact his first scene in the season had on him, stating that it was a spectacular entrance: "It was a brand new towel, which had a hard time staying together. So every time I put it together and let my hands go, it was almost like throwing caution to the wind." Cast member Sara Ramirez noted that one of the most significant scene in the season was when Izzie and George "have this beautiful moment when neither of them speaks, but they say so much and it was just so rich", describing how their interaction during the scene determined everything that would be developed for their arc later. Betsy Beers, however, noted that the most "powerful" scene in the season saw Preston Burke and Cristina Yang in the on-call room, talking about the future of their relationship: "It's fascinating to see how their entire relationship changes and almost disintegrates in this one exchange." Beers and Rhimes expressed their desire to introduce Patrick Dempsey's passion of car racing in the series, although this ultimately did not occur during the season. "Patrick loved it. He's always driving something new, always trying something out", stated the series creator, regarding Dempsey's response to the storyline.

Rhimes also described the difficulty she faced in finding an appropriate love-interest for the character of Alex Karev: "We kept meeting with people and it wasn't until we met Elizabeth Reaser and sat down with her, and 2 seconds into it we realized that she was absolutely the one we'd been looking for." Reaser explained that when she was cast, there were no definite plans for the development of her character, and that only the intrigue of the ferry accident had been explained to her. She also deemed her character "frustrated and scared." As for the make-up process, Reaser stated: "The prosthetic changes your outlook on yourself. It can be very disorienting. It's intense." Beers, however, noted that the focus on Ava was mainly due to her inability to express her feelings through facial expressions, only communicating with her eyes and voice. Executive producer Rob Corn stated that his plan for the original arc was about Jane Doe's inner life, struggling to get out of the situation she is trapped in. He stated that the main characteristics they had been looking for in the actress for the part were strength and vulnerability. He also called Reaser's performance "heart-wrenching and wonderful." Betsy Beers, the show's supervising executive producer, found Izzie to have been marked for life by Denny's death, which matured her "in a very sobering way", but played a major role in making her feel more confident. She also noted the undeniable connection between Izzie and Alex Karev, whose desire to do honorable things has been compared with his "cutting and sarcastic" personality. After Izzie's continuous efforts to change Alex during their relationship in the previous season, Beers announced the possibility of a relationship between the two of them. She also contrasted the female leads on the show with women in film, explaining how the characters on television are shaped in unique ways.

=== Casting ===
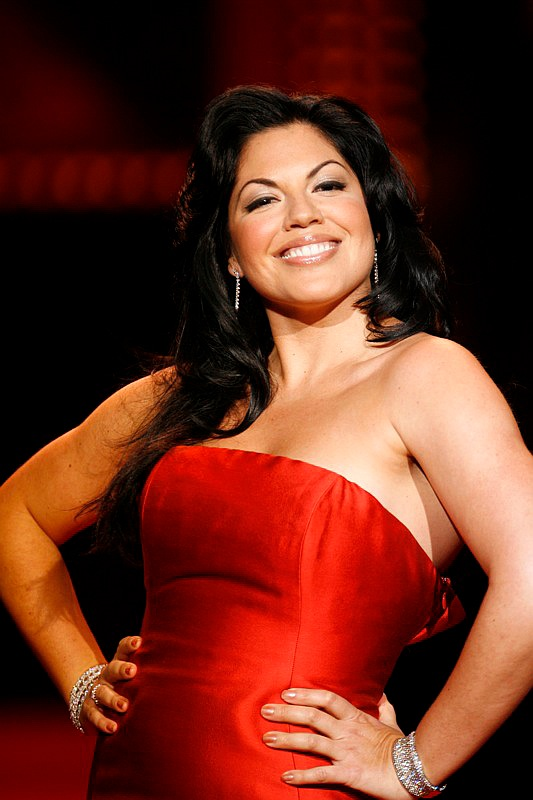
Ramirez was upgraded to series regular status, after numerous appearances throughout the second season.

The third season had 12 roles receiving star-billing, with 10 returning from the previous season, of whom 9 were part of the original cast. All the main characters are physicians in the surgical wing of the fictional Seattle Grace Hospital.

- Ellen Pompeo portrayed Meredith Grey, both the protagonist and the narrator of the series, whose main goal is achieving a balance between the difficulties of the internship, and the complicated relationships in her private life.
- Sandra Oh portrayed Cristina Yang, who quickly develops as Meredith's best-friend, despite the continuous competition against the other interns.
- Katherine Heigl portrayed intern Isobel "Izzie" Stevens, mourning the death of her fiancé as she unexpectedly decides to quit her job; she concludes that she is too personally involved with her patients.
- Justin Chambers acted as Alexander "Alex" Karev, whose abrasive, arrogant attitude is softened with a more emotional and sensitive outlook on his career and relationships.
- T. R. Knight played the role of intern George O'Malley, who gradually becomes more self-confident after his feelings for Meredith diminish.
- Chandra Wilson portrayed fifth-year resident in general surgery, Miranda Bailey, the resident in charge of the 5 interns.
- James Pickens, Jr. acted as Seattle Grace Hospital's Chief of Surgery, Richard Webber, who has to deal with the choice between his career and his marriage.
- Kate Walsh played Addison Montgomery, obstetrician-gynecologist and neonatal surgeon, who comes to terms with her husband Derek Shepherd's desire to divorce, while dealing with the arrival of her former lover.
- Isaiah Washington played the role of attending physician and cardiothoracic surgeon, Preston Burke, who becomes engaged to intern Cristina Yang after their developing a relationship.
- Patrick Dempsey portrayed attending neurosurgeon Derek Shepherd, whose relationship with intern Meredith Grey has been the focal-point of the series since its inception.
- Sara Ramirez began receiving star-billing in the season premiere, after numerous appearances during the last episodes of the second season. She portrayed orthopedic surgeon and fifth-year resident, Calliope "Callie" Torres, whose relationship with intern George O'Malley evolves into a sudden marriage with unpleasant repercussions.
- Eric Dane was also promoted to the series regular status after a guest appearance in the eighteenth episode of the previous season, and an uncredited one in the second episode of this season. He began receiving star-billing in the third episode of the season, portraying attending physician, otolaryngologist and plastic surgeon Mark Sloan, whose arc, describing the attempt at resuming his relationship with Addison Montgomery, is heavily developed throughout the season.

Numerous supporting characters have been given expansive and recurring appearances in the progressive storyline.

- Brooke Smith continues her role as cardiothoracic surgeon Erica Hahn, whose storylines include the rivalry with Preston Burke, her arrival to perform surgery of George O'Malley's dying father, and Richard Webber's decision to hire her in the hospital.
- Chyler Leigh portrayed Meredith's half-sister, Lexie Grey, who is accepted into the hospital's internship program after her mother's sudden death.
- Kate Burton appeared as Meredith Grey's mother, Ellis Grey, a renowned surgeon suffering from Alzheimer's disease, who ultimately dies following a heart attack.
- Veterinary physician Finn Dandrige was portrayed by Chris O'Donnell and appeared in the first 4 episodes of the season to resume the storyline of his romantic relationship with Meredith, previously introduced in the second season
- Deceased since the second-season finale, character Dennsion "Denny" Duquette, Jr. (Jeffrey Dean Morgan) appeared in 2 episodes of the season, during Meredith's limbo sequence.
- Elizabeth Reaser portrayed Rebecca "Ava" Pope, recurring character and love-interest for Alex Karev. She arrives as a patient suffering from amnesia and severe facial injuries after being involved in a massive ferry crash.
- Loretta Devine acted as Adele Webber, Richard's wife, whose continuous struggle to have a normal marriage culminates in her asking her husband to retire.

Other guest stars include:

- Sarah Utterback in the role of nurse Olivia Harper, former love-interest of both George O'Malley and Alex Karev.
- Kali Rocha portraying fifth-year resident Sydney Heron, who enters a competition against Miranda Bailey and Callie Torres for the position of Chief Resident.
- Roger Rees in the role of Colin Marlowe, a cardiothoracic surgeon and Cristina Yang's former professor and lover.
- Jeff Perry portraying Meredith Grey's father, Thatcher Grey.
- Mare Winningham in the role of Susan Grey.
- Embeth Davidtz playing Derek Shepherd's sister Nancy Shepherd, a surgeon who is revealed to have slept with Mark Sloan.
- Tsai Chin in the role of Helen Yang Rubenstein, Cristina's mother.
- Diahann Carroll portraying Jane Burke, Preston Burke's overly protective mother.
- Future Private Practice series regulars Amy Brenneman, Paul Adelstein, Tim Daly, Taye Diggs, Chris Lowell starred in the twenty-second and twenty-third episodes of the season, portraying Violet Turner, Cooper Freedman, Peter Wilder, Sam Bennett and William "Dell" Parker, respectively, in order to make the transition to the proposed spin-off.

=== Spin-off launch ===
On February 21, 2007, The Wall Street Journal reported that ABC was pursuing a spin-off medical drama television series for the series featuring Kate Walsh's character, Addison Montgomery. Subsequent reports confirmed the decision, stating that an expanded 2-hour broadcast of Grey's Anatomy would serve as a backdoor pilot for the proposed spin-off. The cast was reportedly unhappy about the decision, as all hoped the spin-off would have been given to them. Pompeo commented that she felt, as the star, she should have been consulted, and Heigl disclosed that she had hoped for a spin-off for Izzie. The backdoor pilot that aired on May 3, 2007, sees Addison take "a leave-of-absence" from Seattle Grace Hospital, to visit her best-friend from Los Angeles, Naomi Bennett, a reproductive endocrinology and infertility specialist, in order to get pregnant. While in Los Angeles, she meets Bennett's colleagues at the Oceanside Wellness Center and even becomes the clinic's obstetrician-gynecologist for the day. The 2-hour broadcast served as the twenty-second and the twenty-third episodes of the third season, and was directed by Michael Grossman, according to Variety. The cast included Amy Brenneman, Paul Adelstein, Tim Daly, Taye Diggs, Chris Lowell and Merrin Dungey. ABC officially picked up Private Practice for its 2007 lineup on May 11, 2007. KaDee Strickland's character, Charlotte King, who would be introduced in the spin-off's first-season premiere, did not appear in the backdoor pilot. Her addition to the main cast was announced on July 11, 2007, prior to the commencement of the first season. She did not have to audition for the role, but was cast after a meeting with Rhimes. Also not present in the backdoor pilot was Audra McDonald, due to her character, Bennett, being portrayed by a different actress, Merrin Dungey. However, on June 29, 2007, ABC announced that Dungey would be replaced, with no reason given for the change. The premiere episode followed the second part of the season debut of Dancing with the Stars, and provided a lead-in to fellow freshman series, Dirty Sexy Money. Pushing Daisies, a third new series for the evening, rounded out the lineup as a lead-in to Private Practice. The series aired a total of 6 seasons, ending in 2013.

== Reception ==
=== Ratings ===
The second season of Grey's Anatomy ended with an average of 19.44 million viewers per episode and a 6.9 rating share for in the 18–49 demographic, determining the series to finish in #5 out of all the 100 television shows in the season. Due to its high ratings, the series received a full third season renewal for the fall primetime line-up. In response to numerous fan complaints regarding scheduling during the previous seasons, the American Broadcasting Company decided to do major changes in the season. After 2 seasons of airing as a lead-out to fellow ABC series Desperate Housewives, the network decided to move Grey's Anatomy to 9:00 ET in the Thursday night time-slot, dominated by CSI: Crime Scene Investigation, where the series began airing as a lead-out to Ugly Betty, which aired in the time-slot from its first season, until the conclusion of the third in 2009. The show maintained its position as a top 10 series and became the #8 most-watched program in the season, with an average of 19.220 million viewers per episode. The highest-rated episode of the season was the seventeenth, the highly anticipated conclusion of a 3-part story-arc, which was watched by 27.390, receiving a 9.7 rating, a #4 ranking in the week and a #1 ranking in the time-slot. The episode outperformed CSI's "Fallen Idols", which ranked #7 with a 7.7 rating and 21.780 million viewers tuning in.

The lowest-rated episode was its ninth, which was watched by 18.510 million viewers, ranking third in the week with a 6.5 rating, outperforming CSI's Thanksgiving special episode, "Living Legend", watched by 17.170 million viewers with a 6.1 rating and #4 ranking. The season premiere was watched by 25.41 million viewers and received 9.0 rating after being ranked #1 in both the time-slot and the week. The number of viewers increased significantly compared to the previous season premiere, which was watched by 18.980 million viewers and received a 6.8 rating. "Time Has Come Today" also outperformed the previous season finale, which was watched by 22.50 million viewers and was rated 8.0. The season finale was watched by 22.570 million viewers and received an 8.0 rating, ranking #3 in the week after American Idol. Wayne Firedman of Media Daily News described the move from the Sunday night time-slot to Thursdays as "the network's boldest and biggest move." He also expressed concerns regarding the tough competition the series will face, due to airing against CBS Network's CSI. Stephen McPherson of ABC Entertainment explained the reason for the change: "To have all hits on Sunday night doesn't help us. We wanted to be aggressive."

=== Critical response ===
"Tragedy is not always drama - sometimes you have to let your characters smile and allow the grin to stay awhile. Reducing everything to tears and hopeless self-loathing isn't good writing; it's desperate craftsmanship. Here's hoping that the show can perform some much-needed self-surgery before season 4 begins this fall."

— Christopher Monfette of IGN Entertainment on the characters' development during the season.

The season received mixed-to-negative reviews, after 2 seasons that resulted in high critical acclaim. Following a positive outlook on the second season, Christopher Monfette of IGN Entertainment expressed disappointment during the third one, mainly due to the declining quality and lack of realism of the storylines. He noted a growing number of similarities between the season's arcs and the ones that are developed in soap operas, by stating that "the line which separates primetime television from soap opera is oftentimes razor-thin" and admitting that, despite his considering the series "the best drama", he freely admits that it requires some inherent suspension of disbelief, after it "found itself mired in the annoying and absurd." Whereas Monfette acknowledged that the fans would consider the problem to have been a simple case of lazy writing, he noted that over-writing played a main role in the series becoming unexpectedly unrealistic. He also noted the senseless intrigues in the Meredith/Derek relationship, by stating that the season would not have achieved high ratings if a functional relationship had been introduced: "The season generally opts to stall out for its vast majority, providing Meredith with some bizarrely underdeveloped subplot about depression and giving Derek a season's worth of reconsidering to do."

Monfette criticized the romantic development of the characters throughout the season, by describing Burke and Cristina's relationship as an excuse for the possibility of a wedding for Meredith, whereas Burke's unfair behavior towards Cristina is thought to be manipulative, exposing her to his overly-romantic notion of an ideal ceremony. The way the doubts regarding the success of their relationship were resolved in the season finale was described as "most-obvious and least-compelling." IGN Entertainment was also critical of Alex Karev's storyline, who is seen falling for a pregnant and badly injured Jane Doe, despite having always been "self-obsessed." Monfette once again noted the lack of realism in the improvement of Jane Doe's condition, as she gives birth to her baby and undergoes reconstructive surgery in a short amount of time. However, her incapability and continuous struggle to remember who she is, was considered to be "the most affecting and honest plotline of the season", noting the nuanced and emotionally resonant scenes, which gave the show a "charmingly positive, feel-good foundation." Monfette considered Izzie's affair with George as the season's worst but most significant storyline, criticizing it as being "force-fed, emotionally-incorrect, a mismatch from the beginning and a narrative long-shot", which does not express love, but lust. He agreed that the essential problem of the season was its reluctance to move, leading to frustration after seeing "the entertaining familiar characters so weighed down by their most annoying of traits."

In response to the season premiere, Oscar Dahl of Buddytv.com noted the predictability of the series, but expressed hope in its further development, by stating that it has become "a medical chick flick, but a damn good one" with a big and attractive cast. He also praised the interaction between the characters, noting the "smart" dialogue that helps each character evolve. However, Dahl expressed disappointment in the over-emotional scenes, describing them as "off-putting" and "not believable", while comparing them to real-life interactions between people who emote in a more subtle manner than displayed on television. "Emotions ran high in the premiere and there was much crying", stated Dahl, but noted that the dialogue, who he had previously been worried would be "too cutesy", was not bothering, and rather realistic, noting how the show is "smartly written." He also described the acting of Ellen Pompeo and Katherine Heigl as "worthy of attention."

New York Post's Robert Rorke reviewed the numerous characters with heavy romantic development, noting perpetual "merry-go-round of hookups, breakups and makeup sex", while describing the lack of sentimental involvement of Katherine Heigl's character in the first half of the season. However, he deemed Izzie Stevens "the heart-and-soul" of the "sex-filled series", due to the season mostly focusing on the events that come to define her as a person. Rorke named her the show's heroine, and wrote that "Izzie is a welcome, calming presence, despite the devastation she experienced when she failed to save her patient and fiancé Denny Duquette", considering her to have been more prominent than the title character, Meredith Grey, whose storyline received negative critiques: "She used to be the queen of the romantic dilemmas. But lately, she's been a little dopey, with that endless McDreamy soliloquies." He also noted Meredith's decreasing importance in the ongoing arc, describing how Sandra Oh's character development was vital to the success of the season, as he compared her "cutthroat exterior" with the emotional side of her personality that evolves throughout the season. New York Post compared Izzie, who is described as having achieved a depth, to Miranda Bailey, noting the maturity they have, which is uncharacteristic to the fellow interns. Robert Rorke positively reviewed Chandra Wilson's performance by stating that she was "formidable."

Prior to the 59th Primetime Emmy Awards, Stuart Levine of Variety reviewed the performances of the 3 cast members nominated in the Outstanding Supporting Actress category. "The ladies of Grey's Anatomy dominate the category, and it'd be far from a stretch to say at least 2 of those women rose to high dramatics last season", commented Levine, while praising Sandra Oh for her portrayal of Cristina Yang who endured a tumultuous seasoning relationship, seeing her trepidation at spending a life together with the man she loved. He regarded the appearances of Chandra Wilson as more subdued, though "by no means less well-executed." He deemed Miranda Bailey a rock, being the most level-headed character on the show with a right thing to say in any situation. He expressed admiration towards Chandra Wilson, by describing her as being "flashy and over the top", which he considers better than being consistently good. Considering Heigl's chances of winning the Emmy, Levine assessed of her performance, by remarking the slight difficulty she has in reaching each emotional state Izzie Stevens has to go through: "Showrunner Shonda Rhimes puts a lot of pressure on Heigl to carry many intense storylines, and she's up to the challenge." However, he also noted that Izzie's irrational actions during crisis situations may be bothering.

=== Accolades ===
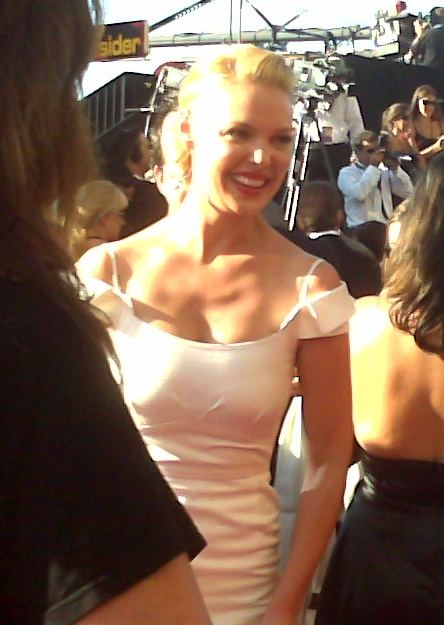
Heigl was awarded at the 59th Primetime Emmy Awards, in spite of her mother's doubts.

The season was one of the most acclaimed of the show, receiving numerous awards and nominations. Several cast and crew members were nominated for their work on the show during its third season at the 59th Primetime Emmy Awards. Chandra Wilson received a nomination for Outstanding Supporting Actress in a Drama Series for her performance in "Oh, the Guilt", the season's fifth episode, whereas Sandra Oh was nominated for the same category for her portrayal of Cristina Yang in "From a Whisper to a Scream", the season's ninth episode. However, they both lost to co-star Katherine Heigl, whose portrayal of Izzie Stevens in "Time After Time", the twentieth episode of the season, resulted in her first Emmy win.

T. R. Knight was also nominated for his performance in the third season in the Outstanding Supporting Actor in a Drama Series category, for the 2-episode arc "Six Days", the eleventh and second episodes of the season. Elizabeth Reaser and Kate Burton were nominated for Outstanding Guest Actress in a Drama Series, for their performances as Rebecca Pope in "My Favorite Mistake", the nineteenth episode in the season, and Ellis Grey in "Wishin' and Hopin'", the fourteenth episode. Linda Lowy and John Brace were nominated for Outstanding Casting in a Drama Series, while Norman T. Leavitt, Brigitte Bugayong, Thomas R. Burman and Bari Dreiband-Burman were nominated for Best Prosthetic Make-Up. The production team was acclaimed for the Best Drama Series category, but only received a nomination.

Sara Ramirez was nominated at the 2007 Alma Awards for her portrayal of Callie Torres. At the 65th Golden Globe Awards, the series was nominated for Best Television Drama Series, while Katherine Heigl's individual performance resulted in a nomination for Best Performance by an Actress in a Supporting Role in a Series, Mini-Series or Motion Picture Made for Television. The show's third season was once again recognized at the 38th National Association for the Advancement of Colored People Awards, when the production team was nominated for Best Drama Series. Also at the 2007 ceremony, Isaiah Washington won Outstanding Actor in a Drama Series for his portrayal of Preston Burke in this season, while Chandra Wilson won Outstanding Supporting Actress in a Drama Series.

Several cast members have been awarded at the PRISM Awards in 2007: Katherine Heigl in the Favorite Female TV Star category for portraying Izzie Stevens, Patrick Dempsey for Favorite Male TV Star in the role of Derek Shepherd, and Chandra Wilson in the Favorite Scene Stealing Star category for her performance of Miranda Bailey. Mark Gordon, Shonda Rhimes, James D. Parriott, Betsy Beers, Peter Horton and Rob Corn have been nominated at the Producers Guild of America 2007 Awards for Television Producer of the Year Award in Episodic Drama for the production of the third season, after winning the award at the 2006 Awards for the second season. At the 2007 Satellite Awards, Ellen Pompeo won the award Best Actress in Drama Series, while T. R. Knight was nominated for Best Supporting Actor in a Series, Miniseries or TV Film and Chandra Wilson for Best Supporting Actress in a Series, Miniseries or TV Film. At the 14th Screen Actors Guild Awards, the series' regular cast received a nomination for Outstanding Cast in Drama Series. Katherine Heigl and Patrick Dempsey were nominated at the 2007 Teen Choice Awards. Also in 2007, the female cast and crew of Grey's Anatomy received the Women in Film Lucy Award, which honors those whose work in television has positively influenced attitudes toward women.

== DVD release ==
"This release will appeal to die-hard Grey's fans who want to eat up every morsel of info they can about the show, but for casual fans the set doesn't really offer that much."

— Kelly West, Cinema Blend

The third season was officially released on DVD in region 1 on September 11, 2007, becoming available in both the United States and Canada. It was released 2 weeks before the fourth season originally began airing. The title of the box set, "Grey's Anatomy: Season Three – Seriously Extended" is a pun, referring to the success the series had, using the medical term "extension." Also in the official title is the world "seriously", which is one frequently-used in the series. The box-set consists of episodes with Dolby Digital 5.1 surround sound and widescreen format, enhanced for television with a 16:9 aspect ratio. It was distributed by Buena Vista Home Entertainment. The same set was released in region 4 on October 31, 2007, being made available first in Australia. In region 2, the season was first released in Romania on August 12, 2008, shortly after the season concluded airing on national television. In the United Kingdom, the season was released on September 15, 2008, approximately a year after its original release in the United States. Although the season aired in high definition, it has not been released on Blu-ray in any region to date.

The box-set includes all the original 25 episodes that aired on the American Broadcasting Company, being divided into 7 discs. Subtitles are available in French, in Spanish and in English for the hearing impaired, whereas the available languages for the character voices are English, French and Spanish. It featured audio commentaries with cast members Kate Walsh, Chandra Wilson, Ellen Pompeo, Kate Burton and Sandra Oh for the first, fourteenth and twenty-first episodes. It also featured the first, seventh, thirteenth and fourteenth episodes as extended episodes, with a longer running time. The bonus features were available on the seventh disc, including interviews with cast members Patrick Dempsey, Ellen Pompeo and Elizabeth Reaser, listed under the titles of "Making Rounds With Patrick Dempsey", "One on One with Ellen Pompeo" and "Prescription for Success: Making Jane Doe a Star", respectively. The region 1 release featured footage from behind the scenes, under the title of "In Stitches: Season 3 Outtakes" and unaired scenes from 9 episodes, including the season premiere and the finale, under the name of "Dissecting Grey's Anatomy." Omnipresent in the bonus material were executive producers Shonda Rhimes and Betsy Beers, providing their outlook on characters, actors and the production process.

The box-set received mixed reviews. Kelly West of CinemaBlend noted that the "seriously extended episodes" were not significantly expanded, only adding a few minutes of extra footage, which don't influence the storyline. She also noted a "weakness" in the audio commentary provided by 4 of the actresses, who she deemed to have been fantastic during the series, describing the features as "random chit-chats." However, she praised Sandra Oh's commentary, noting that she put the most effort in hers by trying to come up with interest topics, while being "amusing and worth listening to." She described the bonus features as "mildly entertaining", emphasizing Dempsey's interview about his passion for racing cars, which she regarded useless. USA Today had a positive perspective on the box-set, by calling it "scintillating" and "addictive."

Grey's Anatomy: The Complete Third Season - Seriously Extended
Set Details		Special Features
25 episodes (4 extended); 7-disc set; English (Dolby Digital 5.1 Surround); Spanish (Dolby Surround 2.0); French (Dolby Surround 2.0); Subtitles: English SDH, Spanish & French; Audio Commentaries; Runtime: 1108 minutes		4 "Seriously Extended" Episodes: "Time Has Come Today", "Where the Boys Are", "Great Expectations" & "Wishin' and Hopin'"; Audio Commentaries on 3 episodes: “Time Has Come Today” with Chandra Wilson and Kate Walsh.; “Wishin' and Hopin'” with Ellen Pompeo and Kate Burton.; “Desire” with Sandra Oh.; Making Rounds With Patrick Dempsey - Spend Some Private Time With Patrick Dempsey At The Track; Shades of Grey: On on One with Ellen Pompeo; Prescription For Success: Make Jane Doe a Star; Dissecting Grey's Anatomy: Unaired Scenes; Good Medicine: Favorite Scenes; In Stitches: Season 3 Outtakes
Release Dates
Region 1	Region 2	Region 4
September 11, 2007	September 15, 2008	October 31, 2007
