= Family Affair (Grey's Anatomy) =

- Grey's Anatomy episode
- Episode no.: Season 12; Episode 24
- Directed by: Debbie Allen
- Written by: William Harper
- Original air date: May 19, 2016
- Running time: 43 minutes

Guest appearances
- Joe Adler as Dr. Isaac Cross; Debra Mooney as Evelyn Hunt; Barbara Montgomery as Louise

Episode chronology
← Previous "At Last"	Next → "Undo"
- Grey's Anatomy season 12

"Family Affair" is the twenty-fourth episode and the season finale of the twelfth season of the American medical drama television series Grey's Anatomy, and the 269th episode overall. Written by William Harper and directed by Debbie Allen, the episode aired on the American Broadcasting Company (ABC) in the United States on May 19, 2016.

The episode centers around the wedding of Owen Hunt (Kevin McKidd) and Amelia Shepherd (Caterina Scorsone), where tensions run high. Meredith Grey (Ellen Pompeo) and Maggie Pierce (Kelly McCreary) provide emotional support to Amelia on her big day. Meanwhile, Jo Wilson (Camilla Luddington) confesses a long-held secret to Andrew DeLuca (Giacomo Gianniotti), while Arizona Robbins (Jessica Capshaw) and Callie Torres (Sara Ramirez) navigate the emotional aftermath of their custody battle. Ben Warren (Jason George) performs an emergency C-section on April Kepner (Sarah Drew) at Meredith's house, delivering April’s baby.

The episode marked the final appearance of longtime cast member Ramirez, who had been part of the series since Season 2. Ramirez announced their departure, stating they were "taking some welcome time off" as their character moved to New York with her daughter.

Upon its original broadcast, "Family Affair" was watched by 8.19 million viewers in the United States, ranking #2 in its time-slot, and earned a 2.3/9 Nielsen rating in the 18–49 demographic. The episode received positive reviews from critics, with praise directed towards the performances of Ramirez and Capshaw.

== Plot ==
The episode opens with a voice-over narration from Meredith Grey (Ellen Pompeo) about questioning the limits of love and embracing the courage to believe in its boundless potential.

On Owen Hunt (Kevin McKidd) and Amelia Shepherd's (Caterina Scorsone) wedding day, Amelia begins to have doubts about the marriage after Meredith talks to Owen about his past with Cristina Yang (Sandra Oh). Meredith confides in Amelia, leading them, along with Maggie Pierce (Kelly McCreary), to run away from the wedding for some much-needed clarity.

Meanwhile, April Kepner (Sarah Drew), who is serving as Owen's best man, realizes she has forgotten the wedding rings and rushes back to Meredith's house with Ben Warren (Jason George) to retrieve them. However, as April's contractions intensify, Ben is forced to perform an emergency C-section, successfully delivering her baby.

Elsewhere, tensions rise between Alex Karev (Justin Chambers) and Jo Wilson (Camilla Luddington) as Jo refuses his marriage proposal, leading Alex to storm out in frustration. Jo, devastated, gets drunk at Joe's bar, and Andrew DeLuca (Giacomo Gianniotti) offers to take her home. In a moment of vulnerability, Jo reveals that she is already married to an abusive man, explaining her reluctance to marry Alex. Just as Andrew is helping her, Alex walks in, misunderstands the situation, and angrily punches Andrew.

Ben's quick actions save both April and her daughter's lives. Arizona Robbins (Jessica Capshaw) makes amends with Callie Torres (Sara Ramirez), agreeing to co-parent their daughter Sofia and allowing Callie to move to New York City with Penny Blake (Samantha Sloyan).

Despite her earlier doubts, Amelia returns to the wedding and ultimately marries Owen. During the ceremony, Nathan Riggs (Martin Henderson) shares a lingering look with Meredith, which does not go unnoticed. Maggie confides in Meredith that she has feelings for Nathan, leaving Meredith shocked and conflicted.

== Production ==
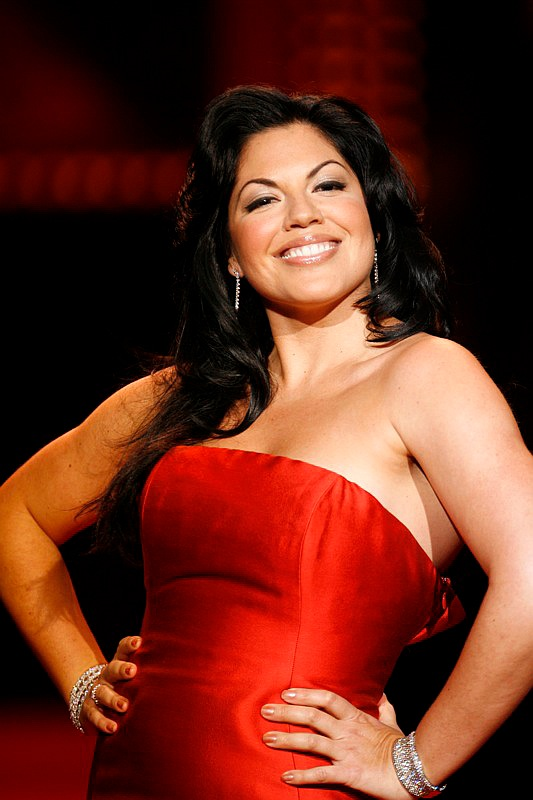
Sara Ramirez made their final appearance as Callie Torres in the episode

The episode marked the final appearance of long-time cast member Sara Ramirez, who portrayed Callie Torres on Grey's Anatomy since 2006. Their character's storyline involved a custody battle with ex-wife Arizona Robbins, played by Jessica Capshaw, which culminated in Callie's decision to move to New York City from Seattle. Following the season finale, Ramirez posted a note on Twitter on May 19, announcing they were "taking some welcome time off." Showrunner Shonda Rhimes responded to the announcement, saying, "I will miss Callie tremendously, but am excited for what the future holds for Sara. She will always have a home at Shondaland."

Speaking at the Vulture Festival in New York City on May 22, Rhimes revealed that she was unaware of Ramirez's decision to leave until after filming had wrapped for the finale. She explained that Callie's exit wasn't part of the original plan, stating, “This one was different because it wasn’t a big planned thing. I had a different plan going, and when Sara came in and said, ‘I really need to take this break,’ I was lucky that we’d shot the end of the season with her going to New York City.”

== Release ==
"Family Affair" was originally broadcast on May 19, 2016, on the American Broadcasting Company (ABC) in the United States. It served as the season finale for the twelfth season of Grey's Anatomy. Upon its initial release, the episode was watched by 8.19 million viewers and scored a 2.3/9 in the key 18–49 demographic, according to Nielsen ratings. This marked an increase from the previous episode, "At Last", which had 7.77 million viewers and a 2.1/8 rating share. The episode ranked #12 in overall viewership and #4 in the 18–49 demographic, making it the second-most watched drama of the night.

== Reception ==
"Family Affair" received positive reviews from television critics upon telecast, with praise directed towards the performances of Sara Ramirez (Callie Torres) and Jessica Capshaw (Arizona Robbins).

The A.V. Club awarded the episode an 'A' grade and described the season as "phenomenal".
