= Chasing Cars =

2006 single by Snow Patrol

Single by Snow Patrol

from the album Eyes Open
- B-side: "It Doesn't Matter Where, Just Drive"; "Play Me Like Your Own Hand"
- Released: 6 June 2006
- Studio: Grouse Lodge Studios (Rosemount, Ireland); The Garage (Kent, England); The Garden (London, England); Angel Recording Studios (London, England)
- Genre: Alternative rock; pop rock
- Length: 4:27 (album version); 4:08 (radio edit); 3:41 (video version)
- Label: Polydor; Fiction
- Songwriters: Gary Lightbody; Jonny Quinn; Nathan Connolly; Tom Simpson; Paul Wilson
- Producer: Jacknife Lee

Snow Patrol singles chronology
| "You're All I Have" (2006) | "Chasing Cars" (2006) | "Hands Open" (2006) |

Music video
- "Chasing Cars" on YouTube

Audio sample
- file; help

"Chasing Cars" is a song by Northern Irish alternative rock band Snow Patrol, released on 6 June 2006 in the United States and 24 July in the United Kingdom as the second single of their fourth album, Eyes Open (2006). The song gained significant popularity in the US after being featured in the second season finale of the medical drama Grey's Anatomy, which aired on 15 May 2006.

"Chasing Cars" was one of the songs that revealed the impact of legal downloads on single sales in the UK, selling consistently for years after its release. The song is Snow Patrol's biggest-selling single to date, ending 2006 as that year's 14th best-selling single in the UK. It was the last song performed live on the BBC's Top of the Pops that year. Released in the post-Britpop period, the song peaked at number six on the UK Singles Chart and number five on the US Billboard Hot 100.

At the 49th Annual Grammy Awards in 2007, "Chasing Cars" was nominated for Best Rock Song, and at the 2007 Brit Awards it was nominated for Best British Single. As of 2019, the song has spent 111 weeks in the official UK top 75, 166 in the top 100 and had sold over one million copies in the UK by October 2013. It has also sold 3,900,000 copies in the US by January 2015, making it one of the top best-selling rock songs in the digital era. In 2009, UK music licensing body PPL announced that "Chasing Cars" was the most widely played song of the decade in the UK. Ten years later, it was revealed as the most-played song of the 21st century on UK radio.

== Background ==
Lead singer Gary Lightbody reportedly wrote the song when he became sober after a binge of white wine, in the garden of song producer Jacknife Lee's cottage in Kent. The song has Lightbody singing a plain melody over sparse guitars, which has an ever-building crescendo. In an interview with Rolling Stone, he said "It's the purest love song that I've ever written. There's no knife-in-the-back twist. When I read these lyrics back, I was like, 'Oh, that's weird.' All the other love songs I've written have a dark edge." The phrase "Chasing Cars" came from Lightbody's father, in reference to a girl Lightbody was infatuated with, who did not reciprocate: "You're like a dog chasing a car. You'll never catch it and you just wouldn't know what to do with it if you did."

== Promotion and release ==
Snow Patrol played "Chasing Cars" on an appearance on Late Night with Conan O'Brien. The song was also performed as the last live performance on long-running music programme Top of the Pops. The band also performed the song when they were the musical guest on 17 March 2007 episode of Saturday Night Live, hosted by Julia Louis-Dreyfus. Additionally, the band played the song live in their appearance at Live Earth; on 7 July 2007, this song was performed during the London leg of the Live Earth concert at Wembley Stadium and at Oxegen later on that night in Ireland.

"Chasing Cars" was heard on the TV show One Tree Hill's third-season finale episode, "The Show Must Go On", which aired in the US on 3 May 2006. 12 days later, the song appeared on the second-season finale of Grey's Anatomy on 15 May 2006, and the song found a larger listening audience and pushed its way onto the download and pop charts in the United States. The song was made into a music video for the show, serving as a promotion for its third season. The music video shows scenes from the first and second seasons as well as previously unseen scenes from the third season, with clips in-between from the UK music video of the song. It was heard again in the eighteenth episode of the show's seventh season on 31 March 2011, along with the cast's cover of Brandi Carlile's "The Story" and the Fray's "How to Save a Life". In the UK, it was also used in the 'Best Bits' montage on the live final of the seventh series of Big Brother on 18 August 2006.

== Music video ==
The US music video, in which Gary Lightbody sings while lying on the ground

Two music videos were made: one for the UK and one for the US.

In the UK music video, directed by Arni & Kinski, Lightbody lies on the open ground as cameras film him from different angles. It starts raining, splashing his face and hands. Lightbody enters a pool of water next to him and, at the end of the video, he gets out of the water, rises to his feet and looks up at the camera as it zooms out overhead.

In the US version, directed by Nick Brandt, Lightbody is shown lying down in busy places while singing. People ignore and step over him. Among the places he lies are a diner (he sits at a table at the beginning), an intersection in Downtown L.A., the top of an escalator, a subway car, the top of a hill overlooking the Golden State Freeway and, at the end, a bed in a hotel room. Unusually, this version removed some parts of the song, including making the beginning shorter.

== Reception ==
=== Critical reception ===
The song received critical acclaim. Billboard magazine's Sven Phillip found "Chasing Cars" to be the only song on Eyes Open that was "not to be missed". He called it a "catchy, colossal ballad that succeeds without any fireworks". About.com called it a "true gem of a love song".

The song was nominated for a 2007 Grammy Award for Best Rock Song as well as for a 2007 BRIT Award for Best British Single. In 2007, "Chasing Cars" was voted number one on the Top 500 Songs: The Words Behind the Music, on Bristol's GWR FM (and other stations in The One Network).

=== Commercial performance ===
"Chasing Cars" was released as an overlapping single in early June, and the video was re-edited to include clips from the show, Grey's Anatomy. The video failed to catch on, regardless, so a third version was filmed for the edited single version of the song. On 13 September 2006, the song soared in the digital music charts to become the most-downloaded song in the US iTunes Store, just one day after the DVD release of the second season of Grey's Anatomy.

The song was released as a download-only single on 17 July 2006, and entered the UK Singles Chart in the week ending 29 July at number 25 on the strength of download sales alone. Its physical release on 24 July pushed the song up to number 15, peaking six weeks later at number six. However, seven weeks after that, in November the CD single was deleted and, under the chart rules prevailing at that time, the song was removed from the chart two weeks after that, having clocked up 17 weeks in total. It was then absent from the chart for seven weeks, but in January 2007, a change to the chart rules meant that all downloads, with or without a physical equivalent, were now eligible to chart. "Chasing Cars" duly surged back in at a top 10 position (number nine, just three places below its peak), and remained on the chart for 48 consecutive weeks, entirely on downloads, only falling out again in December. After a three-week absence, in January 2008 it was back again, for 13 weeks this time, peaking at No. 50. It then bowed out for a third time, re-entered the top 75 in June, August, October and November 2008, November 2009, January and December 2010, and March, July and December 2011, and re-entered again on 24 August 2013, charting at No. 66 before climbing up to No. 60 the following week, and up to No. 47 the week after, now taking the song's tally up to 111 weeks on the UK Top 75, which at the time, made it the 2nd longest runner of all time (now currently the 3rd longest runner behind "Perfect" by Ed Sheeran), bettered only by Frank Sinatra's "My Way" (124 weeks). Only for 14 weeks out of those 111 was a physical copy of "Chasing Cars" officially available. It has also spent 166 weeks on the Top 100. It sold its millionth copy in the UK in October 2013.

A physical release of the song did not occur at all in Australia, where the song spent 10 weeks over summer 2006/2007 at number one on the Digital Track Chart. Under ARIA chart rules at the time, songs that had a digital-only release were ineligible to chart. When the rules finally changed in October 2007 to include digital-only singles (partly due to declining physical sales), "Chasing Cars" had dwindled in popularity and peaked at number 53. Its sales prior to the week it began charting on the official singles chart were not counted; regardless, it spent a further 63 weeks in the lower half of the chart and was later certified triple platinum (for over 210,000 downloads).

"Chasing Cars" was voted number one in a 2006 Virgin Radio Top 500 Songs of All Time poll. After the popularity of its association with Grey's Anatomy. The song peaked at No. 5 on the Billboard Hot 100 in the US, the band's first Top 10 hit in the US. The song peaked at No. 8 on the Modern Rock Tracks chart. It was the fourth best selling digital single of 2006 in the UK, totalling 190,000 legal downloads, and is the UK's 26th most downloaded song of all time. "Chasing Cars" also went to number one on the Adult Contemporary chart for two non-consecutive weeks. As of February 2015, the song has sold 3,900,000 copies in the US.

=== Accolades ===
| Publication | Country | Accolade | Rank |
|---|---|---|---|
| The Rock FM | New Zealand | The Rock 1000 | 554 |

== Track listings ==
- UK CD single
1. "Chasing Cars" – 4:27
2. "It Doesn't Matter Where, Just Drive" – 3:37
- UK 7-inch single
1. "Chasing Cars" – 4:27
2. "Play Me Like Your Own Hand" – 4:15
- European CD single
1. "Chasing Cars" – 4:27
2. "Play Me Like Your Own Hand" – 4:15
3. "It Doesn't Matter Where, Just Drive" – 3:37
- Dutch CD single
1. "Chasing Cars" – 4:27
2. "You're All I Have" (live from BNN) – 4:29
3. "How to Be Dead" (live from BNN) – 3:24
4. "Chasing Cars" (live from BNN) – 4:20

== Personnel ==
Personnel are adapted from Eyes Open liner notes.

Snow Patrol

- Gary Lightbody – vocals, guitar
- Gary Lightbody, Nathan Connolly, Tom Simpson, Paul Wilson, Jonny Quinn – songwriter
- Nathan Connolly – lead guitar, backing vocals
- Tom Simpson – keyboards
- Paul Wilson – bass guitar
- Jonny Quinn – drums

Additional personnel

- Jacknife Lee – production

== Charts ==
=== Weekly charts ===
| Chart (2006–2012) | Peak position |
|---|---|
| Australia (ARIA) | 53 |
| Australia Digital Tracks (ARIA) | 1 |
| Austria (Ö3 Austria Top 40) | 2 |
| Belgium (Ultratop 50 Flanders) | 3 |
| Belgium (Ultratip Bubbling Under Wallonia) | 13 |
| Canada Hot 100 (Billboard) | 18 |
| Canada (Canadian Singles Chart) | 1 |
| Canada CHR/Top 40 (Billboard) | 2 |
| Canada AC (Billboard) | 5 |
| Canada Hot AC (Billboard) | 1 |
| Canada Rock (Billboard) | 14 |
| Croatia (HRT) | 4 |
| Czech Republic Airplay (ČNS IFPI) | 3 |
| Denmark (Tracklisten) | 13 |
| Europe (Eurochart Hot 100) | 10 |
| France (SNEP) | 57 |
| Germany (GfK) | 8 |
| Ireland (IRMA) | 6 |
| Netherlands (Dutch Top 40) | 24 |
| Netherlands (Single Top 100) | 21 |
| New Zealand (Recorded Music NZ) | 3 |
| Norway (VG-lista) | 9 |
| Scottish Singles Sales (Official Charts) | 20 |
| Slovakia Airplay (ČNS IFPI) | 59 |
| Spain (Promusicae) | 19 |
| Sweden (Sverigetopplistan) | 40 |
| Switzerland (Schweizer Hitparade) | 4 |
| UK Singles (Official Charts) | 6 |
| UK Airplay (Music Week) | 4 |
| UK Singles Downloads (Official Charts) | 2 |
| US Billboard Hot 100 | 5 |
| US Adult Alternative Airplay (Billboard) | 1 |
| US Adult Contemporary (Billboard) | 1 |
| US Adult Pop Airplay (Billboard) | 1 |
| US Alternative Airplay (Billboard) | 8 |
| US Pop Airplay (Billboard) | 10 |

=== Year-end charts ===
| Chart (2006) | Position |
|---|---|
| Australia Digital Tracks (ARIA) | 8 |
| Belgium (Ultratop 50 Flanders) | 45 |
| Europe (Eurochart Hot 100) | 73 |
| Switzerland (Schweizer Hitparade) | 69 |
| UK Singles (OCC) | 14 |
| UK Airplay (Music Week) | 9 |
| US Billboard Hot 100 | 29 |
| US Adult Top 40 (Billboard) | 22 |

| Chart (2007) | Position |
|---|---|
| Australia Digital Tracks (ARIA) | 24 |
| Austria (Ö3 Austria Top 40) | 36 |
| Belgium (Ultratop 50 Flanders) | 22 |
| Europe (Eurochart Hot 100) | 30 |
| Germany (Media Control GfK) | 38 |
| Netherlands (Single Top 100) | 32 |
| New Zealand (RIANZ) | 39 |
| Switzerland (Schweizer Hitparade) | 37 |
| UK Singles (OCC) | 34 |
| US Billboard Hot 100 | 61 |
| US Adult Contemporary (Billboard) | 3 |
| US Adult Top 40 (Billboard) | 6 |

| Chart (2008) | Position |
|---|---|
| Switzerland (Schweizer Hitparade) | 97 |
| UK Singles (OCC) | 95 |

| Chart (2009) | Position |
|---|---|
| UK Singles (OCC) | 153 |

| Chart (2010) | Position |
|---|---|
| UK Singles (OCC) | 183 |

| Chart (2011) | Position |
|---|---|
| UK Singles (OCC) | 157 |

| Chart (2012) | Position |
|---|---|
| UK Singles (OCC) | 168 |

=== Decade-end charts ===
| Chart (2000–2009) | Position |
|---|---|
| UK Top 100 Songs of the Decade | 49 |

=== All-time charts ===
| Chart | Position |
|---|---|
| US Adult Alternative Airplay (Billboard) | 35 |
| US Adult Top 40 (Billboard) | 14 |
| UK Download Chart | 26 |
| UK Singles (OCC) | 93 |

== Certifications ==
| Region | Certification | Certified units/sales |
|---|---|---|
| Australia (ARIA) | 14× Platinum | 980,000^{‡} |
| Austria (IFPI Austria) | 2× Platinum | 60,000^{*} |
| Belgium (BRMA) | Gold | 25,000^{*} |
| Brazil (Pro-Música Brasil) | 2× Platinum | 120,000^{‡} |
| Denmark (IFPI Danmark) | 2× Platinum | 180,000^{‡} |
| Germany (BVMI) | 2× Platinum | 600,000^{‡} |
| Italy (FIMI) | Platinum | 50,000^{‡} |
| New Zealand (RMNZ) | 7× Platinum | 210,000^{‡} |
| Spain (Promusicae) | 2× Platinum | 120,000^{‡} |
| United Kingdom (BPI) | 7× Platinum | 4,200,000^{‡} |
| United States (RIAA) | 5× Platinum | 3,900,000 |
Streaming
| Denmark (IFPI Danmark) | Gold | 900,000^{†} |
^{*} Sales figures based on certification alone.^{‡} Sales+streaming figures based on certification alone.^{†} Streaming-only figures based on certification alone.

== Notable covers ==
- In September 2014, Ed Sheeran delivered a rendition of the song on MTV.
- In July 2023, Irish pop singer and member of the girl group Girls Aloud, Nadine Coyle, released a dance cover of the song titled "If I Lay Here (Chasing Cars)".
- Nate Smith covered this song on the digital deluxe edition of his self-titled debut album in 2023.

== In popular culture ==
- The song was used in Gavin & Stacey in the first series finale where the couple marry.
- The song was featured in the 2016 documentary Holy Hell about the 1980s West Hollywood cult Buddhafield and its allegedly manipulative and abusive leader. The song plays on toward the end of the documentary as ex-members of the cult are seen dancing in a field and while crying.
- The song is referenced by Ed Sheeran in his song "All of the Stars".
- The song was used in EastEnders during the funeral of Zoe Slater, played by Michelle Ryan.

== See also ==
- List of million-selling singles in the United Kingdom
- List of songs which have spent the most weeks on the UK Singles Chart
