= Callie Torres =

Fictional character in Grey's Anatomy

- Grey's Anatomy character
- The Season 9 Promotional Photo of Sara Ramirez as Dr. Callie Torres
- First appearance: "What Have I Done to Deserve This?" (2.19); February 26, 2006 (as recurring cast) "Time Has Come Today" (3.01); September 21, 2006 (as series regular)
- Last appearance: "Family Affair" (12.24); May 19, 2016
- Created by: Shonda Rhimes
- Portrayed by: Sara Ramirez

In-universe information
- Full name: Calliope Iphegenia Torres
- Title(s): Former Chief of Orthopedic Surgery; Former Board Director at Grey Sloan Memorial Hospital; M.D.
- Occupation: Former Chief of Orthopedic Surgery, Attending orthopedic surgeon at Grey Sloan Memorial Hospital
- Family: Carlos Torres (father); Lucia Torres (mother); Aria (maternal half-sister)
- Spouses: George O'Malley (m. 2007; div. 2008) Arizona Robbins (m. 2011; divorced; reconciled 2015)
- Significant others: Alex Karev (one night stand); Mark Sloan (Best Friend, Ex-Lover, deceased); Erica Hahn (dated); Penelope Blake (ex-girlfriend)
- Children: Sofia Robbins Sloan Torres
- Religion: Catholicism

Calliope Iphigenia "Callie" Torres, M.D. is a fictional character from the medical drama television series Grey's Anatomy, which airs on the ABC in the United States. The character was created by series producer Shonda Rhimes and is portrayed by Sara Ramirez. Introduced in Season 2 as a senior orthopedic resident, Torres initially serves as a love interest for intern George O'Malley (T. R. Knight). She eventually becomes an attending orthopedic surgeon and was originally contracted as a recurring character, but received star-billing in Season 3.

Torres was first conceived as a romantic interest, and eventual wife, for O'Malley, and was intentionally created to be somewhat disliked by her colleagues. Over time, her character developed deeper storylines, including relationships with plastic surgeon Mark Sloan (Eric Dane), cardiothoracic surgeon Erica Hahn (Brooke Smith), and pediatric surgeon Arizona Robbins (Jessica Capshaw), whom she later marries. Her bisexual relationships with O'Malley, Hahn, and Robbins, and her character's development throughout the series, garnered widespread critical acclaim. Torres became one of the longest-running LGBTQ+ characters in television history, appearing in 11 seasons and a total of 239 episodes. (Note: Nekane Beitia from Basque soap opera Goenkale, portrayed by Itziar Ituño, appeared in 15 seasons and more than 1500 episodes; and Kerry Weaver from the US television show ER, portrayed by Laura Innes, appeared in 12 seasons and 249 episodes.)

Ramirez's portrayal of Torres was highly praised by television critics, and the character grew significantly in popularity as the series progressed. Ramirez received nominations for several awards for their portrayal, including the NAACP Image Award for Outstanding Supporting Actress in a Drama Series and the ALMA Award for Outstanding Actress in a Drama Television Series. In 2013, AfterEllen.com ranked Torres #7 on their list of "Top 50 Favorite Female TV Characters".

At the end of Season 12, Ramirez departed from the show after 10 years, citing a desire to take a break and pursue other opportunities.

== Storylines ==
Callie Torres is introduced as an orthopedic surgery resident with a romantic interest in intern George O'Malley (T. R. Knight). The two begin a relationship, and Torres moves into Meredith Grey (Ellen Pompeo)'s house. However, as their relationship becomes strained, O'Malley confronts her, leading Torres to move into a hotel. Following their breakup, she has a one-night stand with plastic surgeon Mark Sloan (Eric Dane), who later becomes a close friend. Torres and O'Malley eventually reconcile and impulsively marry in Las Vegas. Conflicted, O'Malley confides in fellow intern Izzie Stevens (Katherine Heigl) about his marriage woes, leading to a drunken one-night stand between the two. Torres, unaware of O'Malley's infidelity, grows suspicious and expresses her desire to have a child. Shortly after, she discovers O'Malley's affair, leading to the end of their marriage. Professionally, Torres excels when she is appointed Chief Resident but soon struggles with the role and is eventually demoted.

Torres then forms a friendship with Erica Hahn (Brooke Smith), the hospital's new chief of cardiothoracic surgery, which blossoms into a romantic relationship after Hahn kisses her in an elevator. Both women are inexperienced with same-sex relationships, and Torres grapples with her bisexuality. Hahn displayed an attitude of biphobia towards Torres after they had sex, not understanding why Torres could feel pleasure with both men and women. To clarify her own feelings about bisexual sex, Torres ended up cheating on Hahn with Sloan. Although initially forgiven, Hahn leaves Seattle Grace after a work-related argument, ending their relationship. Shortly thereafter, pediatric surgeon Arizona Robbins (Jessica Capshaw) enters Torres' life, and they begin dating. Their relationship faces challenges when Torres comes out to her father, Carlos (Héctor Elizondo), who disowns her, cutting her off both financially and emotionally. When Torres is denied an attending position, she publicly rebukes Chief Richard Webber (James Pickens Jr.) and resigns, taking a job at Mercy West Hospital. When the two hospitals merge, she is promoted to attending orthopedic surgeon. Her father eventually accepts her sexuality, but when Torres expresses her desire for children, Robbins disagrees, leading to their temporary breakup.

After a gunman wreaks havoc at the hospital, Torres and Robbins reconcile, with Robbins agreeing to have children. When Robbins is offered a prestigious grant to treat children in Malawi, Torres reluctantly agrees to move with her for three years. However, her lack of enthusiasm causes Robbins to break up with her and leave alone. Heartbroken, Torres moves in with Sloan, leading to another one-night stand. Robbins later returns, apologizing and asking for forgiveness, but Torres initially rebuffs her. Soon after, Torres discovers she is pregnant with Sloan's child. Robbins agrees to raise the baby, though she is uneasy about Sloan's permanent involvement in their lives. While on a trip, Robbins proposes to Torres, but before Torres can respond, they are in a head-on collision with a truck, leaving Torres severely injured. Obstetrician-gynecologist Addison Montgomery (Kate Walsh) performs an emergency surgery to save Torres' life and deliver their premature baby. Both survive, and Torres agrees to marry Robbins. After recovering from her injuries, Torres navigates family tensions, particularly from her mother (Gina Gallego), who disapproves of the wedding and their daughter, Sofia. Despite these challenges, Torres and Robbins marry in a garden ceremony officiated by Miranda Bailey (Chandra Wilson).

Their relationship is later tested after a plane crash that claims the lives of Sloan and Lexie Grey (Chyler Leigh). Torres makes the difficult decision to have Alex Karev (Justin Chambers) amputate Robbins' leg to save her life, which causes deep resentment in their relationship. As the hospital faces bankruptcy, Torres, along with Robbins and other survivors, purchase the hospital with help from the Harper Avery Foundation, becoming part of the hospital's new board of directors. Although their professional lives stabilize, Robbins' infidelity with Lauren Boswell (Hilarie Burton) during a storm further strains their marriage. Torres discovers the affair, and the two have a heated confrontation, revealing that Robbins has never forgiven Torres for consenting to the amputation of her leg. This leads to their separation, with Torres moving in with Meredith Grey and Derek Shepherd (Patrick Dempsey) while navigating co-parenting with Robbins.

After a failed lawsuit and reconciliation efforts, Torres and Robbins buy a new home together and attempt to have a second child. However, Torres learns that she cannot carry another pregnancy due to complications from previous surgeries. Despite attempting therapy, Torres eventually decides to end their marriage, feeling suffocated. Torres then begins dating Penny Blake (Samantha Sloyan), who is later revealed to have been one of Shepherd's doctors on the day of his death. This revelation leads to tension with Torres’ friends and colleagues at Grey Sloan Memorial Hospital.

When Torres plans to move to New York with Blake and take their daughter Sofia with her, Robbins sues for sole custody. Torres ultimately loses the court case and breaks up with Blake. Later, Robbins offers a shared custody agreement, allowing Torres to relocate to New York while ensuring Sofia spends time with both parents. Torres is occasionally referenced after her departure, and at the end of Season 14, Robbins also leaves Seattle to move to New York, and it is implied that the two reconciled after Torres and Blake had broken up.

== Development ==
=== Casting & Creation ===
As a Latin person, I was really proud to see the ethnic people on the show. I thought, Wow, there are no color limits. Nobody's making comments about how there are African-Americans on the show and an Asian on the show. However, I did think, Where's the Latin person?

— Ramirez on Grey's Anatomy

Ramirez's Broadway performance in Spamalot garnered the attention of ABC executives, who offered Ramirez a role on any ABC television series. Ramirez chose Grey's Anatomy. Reflecting on their initial audition, Ramirez explained that the producers liked them and were eager to add them to the show, though they were unsure initially about what role Ramirez would play. Ramirez expressed amazement at how rare it was for executives to offer such a unique opportunity, recalling that they said, "Pick a show, any show." Shonda Rhimes elaborated on the process, stating, "I was looking for a girlfriend for George, but it was in the infancy stages, so I had no idea what I was looking for." Rhimes then built the character of Callie Torres around Ramirez after their meeting. Initially, the character was given recurring status during the second season, but Ramirez was promoted to series regular in the third season, alongside Eric Dane, who portrayed Mark Sloan. Ramirez discusses maintaining relationships with co-stars:

The weird thing about working in television is that you only see the people that you're in scenes with. It's not like you're all running around the set together. So if you're going to hang out together, you kind of have to make an effort. And I think people have families, people have lives.

=== Characterization ===
While we are disheartened that the burgeoning relationship between Callie and Erica has come to an end, the character of Callie, who has now been identified as a bisexual woman by show creator Shonda Rhimes, remains and her journey continues.

— Gay & Lesbian Alliance Against Defamation on Torres's bisexual storyline

The American Broadcasting Company (ABC) described Callie Torres as "driven," "determined," and "outgoing", while also noting her weaknesses as "defensive" and "impulsive". Ramirez characterized their role as someone who "appears to be a certain way, but has some very complex issues going on behind the scenes. She seems to be a very strong personality, someone who really believes in herself and has worked very hard to get where she is. She's very competitive but does have a sense of self, so she doesn't need to win all the time."

At the time of Torres's initial appearance, she was somewhat disliked by fans, largely due to her perceived interference in the relationship between George O'Malley (T. R. Knight) and Meredith Grey (Ellen Pompeo). When asked about the fan reaction, Ramirez commented, "You do run across a lot of people who are extremely invested in that storyline. Obviously, I've heard some negative stuff."

Towards the end of the fourth season, Torres grew closer to cardiothoracic surgeon Erica Hahn (Brooke Smith), forming a relationship that fans affectionately dubbed "Eri-Cal", and later referred to as "Callica" by Michael Ausiello of Entertainment Weekly. Rhimes explained that, "Callie and Erica have an undeniable chemistry, and watching the story unfold is something the writers are looking forward to. I wanted to illuminate their relationship in the same way we do all relationships on the show — it will be funny, sweet, honest, and a little bit dirty."

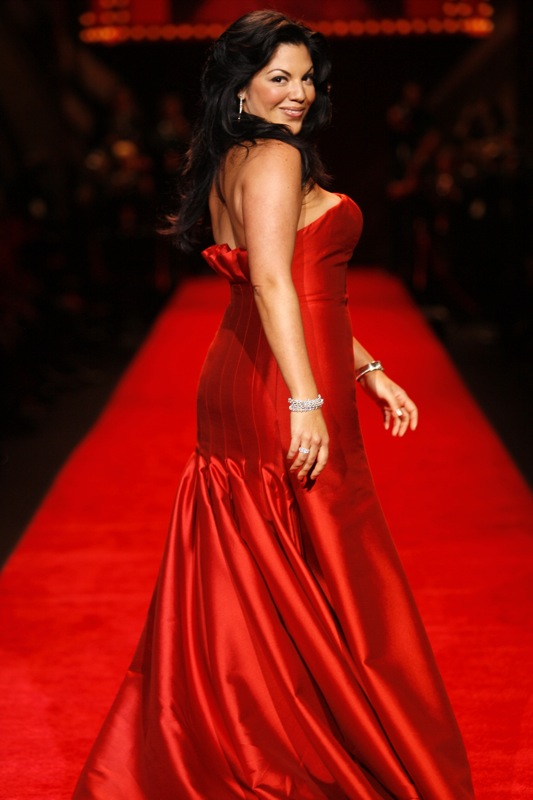
Torres served as the primary vocalist in the show's musical episode, "Song Beneath the Song", being described as "amazing" by fellow cast member, Kevin McKidd.

Rhimes explained that in developing the relationship between Torres and Hahn, the writers wanted it to be "real – not some stunt to get people talking." She added, "We wanted to see what would happen if a woman suddenly had feelings for another woman." The two characters shared a kiss in the Season 4 finale, which D. Williams of AfterEllen.com noted as significant: "Callie and Erica became the only regular lesbian/bisexual female characters currently on network television. This is also the first time that two regular characters on a network show have begun a lesbian romance, as opposed to one becoming involved with a new lesbian character introduced expressly for that relationship."

Before continuing with the storyline, the show's producers consulted with the Gay & Lesbian Alliance Against Defamation (GLAAD) to ensure they maintained realism throughout. Trish Doolan, star of April's Shower, was invited to consult in the workshop sessions, noting, "They were really wanting to be truthful to the two characters they're focusing on in the woman-woman relationship."[12] Nikki Weiss, another consultant, added, "They didn't want to stereotype anything either, and write from a place where they didn't understand it. ... I don't think they did it as a stunt to get people back to watching after the strike. I really think that they wanted to develop these two characters, and you could see a closeness with them way before they ever decided any kind of [romantic relationship]. I think they just have a chemistry together, as actresses, too. You could tell that in the room."[12]

In the show's fifth season, Torres began a relationship with Arizona Robbins (Jessica Capshaw). Fans coined the relationship "Calzona" (for Callie + Arizona). Rhimes praised the chemistry between Callie and Arizona, even comparing it to the show's primary couple, Grey and Derek Shepherd (played by Patrick Dempsey), stating, "They have that little thing that makes you want to watch them." In the episode "An Honest Mistake", Robbins initially rejected Torres, citing Torres's "inexperience" as a reason for the rejection. Series writer Peter Nowalk offered the insight:

I totally understand why Arizona wouldn't want to date a newborn. It's like getting a Freshman as your Physics lab partner even though you're a Senior who not only knows the Laws of Motion but has mastered them in ways that would rock that Freshman's world. Which is not to say the Freshman won't grow to be really good at Physics, or that Callie won't catch up to Arizona on the lesbian front, it's simply that Arizona might not have the patience to wait that long.

— Peter Nowalk, Grey Matter

The couple ultimately decided to begin a relationship, but they experienced difficulties before eventually reuniting. Rhimes commented on their reconciliation: "I love [Callie] with Arizona... I like that they make me feel hopeful about love." Rhimes also expressed her thoughts on their relationship during Season 6, stating: "I would like to see Callie happily in a long-term relationship. We have so much to explore with them, because we barely know anything about [Arizona]."

Callie and Arizona had a five-year relationship, which culminated in their marriage during Season 7 and ended up in divorce in Season 11. Callie later began a new relationship with Penny Blake (Samantha Sloyan) and decided to move to New York with her in the Season 12 finale. Reflecting on Ramirez's unexpected departure, Rhimes explained, "This one was different because it wasn't a big planned thing. I had a different plan going, and when Sara came in and said, 'I really need to take this break', I was lucky that we'd shot the end of the season with her going to New York."

== Reception ==
What was truly revolutionary about Callie is that she was never defined by any single aspect of herself. She was curvy, Latina, and bisexual, and she was also a funny, frustrating, and lovable doctor with an amazing career and strong friendships. Callie was never expected to be perfect. She was allowed to be as messy as every other character on Grey's Anatomy, and, for everyone who identified with her as a whole or in part, it was a huge relief to see this woman who represented so many perspectives be allowed to just be awesome.

— Sabienna Bowmna of Bustle

Maureen Ryan from the Chicago Tribune was critical of Torres' initial character development. Reviewing the Season 3 premiere, she wrote that the writers should give up on Callie, explaining that they had made her "far too obviously the 'weird girl', but there's nothing underneath her brusque persona." However, Callie's marriage to O'Malley was well-received; Staci Krause of IGN wrote: "Their relationship has been a roller-coaster, and it was nice to see this turn of events, as she really is a perfect contrast to George."

Discussing the character in terms of her relationship with Erica Hahn, Williams was largely positive, noting that: "The storyline offered both the drama Grey's is known for and a truthfulness network television has rarely achieved when it comes to lesbian relationships." Trish Doolan and Nikki Weiss, invited by GLAAD to consult with Grey's Anatomy producers on the storyline, praised the effort put into researching the issue by the writers and actors involved. However, they were more critical of the scene where Hahn kissed Callie in front of Mark Sloan in an elevator. Weiss commented: "I just felt like, if they really cared about each other, I don't think they would do that as a stunt. That seemed a little, I don't know, forced. ... [It] was more like a conquest, like he could have [Hahn] too or something."

LGBT website AfterEllen.com agreed with this view, criticizing how the scene was edited to repeatedly cut to Sloan's point of view, seemingly "privileging the male-gaze." Nonetheless, Torres was included in AfterEllen's list of the Top 50 Lesbian & Bisexual Characters, ranking at #6 and in their Top 50 Favorite Female TV Characters. The character was also listed in Wetpaint's "10 Hottest TV Doctors on TV". Later, AfterEllen.com ranked Torres #7 in their list of "Top 50 Favorite Female TV Characters".

Commenting on Hahn's abrupt departure from the show, Dorothy Snarker, writing for AfterEllen.com, expressed caution regarding Torres and Robbins' budding relationship: "I ... can't help but be wary of how the Grey's writers will handle this relationship. Jessica [Capshaw] has proven lovely and likable in her brief screen-time so far. But it's not how the romance starts, but what happens next that really matters."

Regarding the series' musical episode, Nicole Golden of TV Fanatic praised Ramirez's rendition of Snow Patrol's "Chasing Cars" as "amazing" and referred to their performance in Kate Havnevik's "Grace" as "beautiful". Margaret Lyons of New York Magazine appreciated the evolution of Bailey and Torres's friendship in the first half of Season 9, describing it as "the one bright-spot": "They joke, they tease each other, they offer sage love advice to one another, now that they're both on their second marriages."

== Awards ==
Ramirez's portrayal of Callie Torres earned them high critical acclaim and several prestigious nominations and awards. In 2006, they were a part of the ensemble cast that won the Satellite Award for Best Cast – Television Series. They were also a part of the ensemble cast that won the Screen Actors Guild Award for Outstanding Performance by an Ensemble in a Drama Series in 2007, for which they were also nominated in 2008. They were nominated for the ALMA Award for Outstanding Actress in a Drama Television Series in 2007 and 2008. In 2011, Ramirez earned a nomination for Outstanding Supporting Actress in a Drama Series at the 42nd NAACP Image Awards.
