= Sarah Utterback =

American actress

- Occupations: Actress, film/theater producer
- Years active: 2005–present
- Known for: Grey's Anatomy

Sarah Utterback is an American actress, most notable for her role as Nurse Olivia Jankovic on ABC's medical drama series Grey's Anatomy. She is also a film and theater producer.

== Life ==
Utterback attended New Hampton High School in New Hampton, Iowa.

== Career ==
Her theater credits include the U.S. premiere of Ladybird by Russian playwright Vassily Sigarev, and the world premiere stage adaptation of Federico Fellini's Il bidone. She originated the title role in Surfer Girl, a one-woman play in the Seven Deadly Plays series by playwright and screenwriter Leslye Headland.

Film and television credits include My First Time Driving (2007), Ghost Whisperer, Cold Case, Family Guy, Medium, and Grey's Anatomy. She produced the short film Who You Know (2007).

== Filmography ==
Film
Year	Title	Role	Notes
2007	Who You Know	Producer, not actor	Short film
2007	My First Time Driving	Rachel	Short film
2009	Path Lights	Mariana	Short film

Television
Year	Title	Role	Notes
2005	Medium	Abducted Girl #1/Carol Waller	Episodes: "When Push Comes to Shove: Part 1" and "Time Out of Mind"
2005–2009, 2018	Grey's Anatomy	Nurse Olivia Jankovic (née Harper)	19 episodes
2005-2009	Family Guy	Lindsay Lohan	Episodes: "The Father, the Son, and the Holy Fonz" and "We Love You Conrad"
2007	Cold Case	Tina Quinn '07	Episode: "That Woman"
2007	Ghost Whisperer	Colleen Finn	Episode: "No Safe Place"
2009	NCIS	Elaina Marcus	Episode: "Reunion"
2011-2012	Reception	Alison	11 episodes
2024-2026	9-1-1	Martha	Episodes: "Hotshots" and "Streets of Fire"
