= Private Practice season 5 =

Private Practice
- Season 5
- DVD cover art for the complete fifth season of Private Practice
- Starring: Kate Walsh; Tim Daly; Benjamin Bratt; Paul Adelstein; KaDee Strickland; Brian Benben; Caterina Scorsone; Griffin Gluck; Taye Diggs; Amy Brenneman
- No. of episodes: 22

Release
- Original network: ABC
- Original release: September 29, 2011 – May 15, 2012

Season chronology
- ← Previous; Season 4 Next → Season 6

The fifth season of Private Practice premiered on September 29, 2011. It was announced on February 9, 2011, that Audra McDonald, who plays the character Naomi Bennett, will not return as a regular cast member in the fifth season, however she may return as a guest star or a recurring character.

Following the departure of Audra McDonald, it was announced on March 20, 2011, that actor Benjamin Bratt will be added to the series as a regular cast member for the fifth season. The details of his character were released on August 7, as he is set to play Jake Reilly, an accomplished fertility specialist that is knowledgeable in cutting-edge technology and procedures.

Later in the season, Cooper Freedman was revealed to have had an 8-year-old son from a previous one-night stand. Son Mason is portrayed by child actor Griffin Gluck. While Gluck initially served as a guest star, he was promoted to series regular later on in the season. Gluck is notable for being the first child to be a series regular in Private Practice or in the original series Grey's Anatomy.

== Cast ==
=== Casting ===
Following the renewal of Private Practice, it was announced that Benjamin Bratt would be returning to the show as a series regular, and his character was reviewed to be named, Jake Reilly. It was also announced that Audra McDonald would not be returning as a series regular, but instead could possible return as a recurring cast member. The remaining regular cast including, Kate Walsh, Tim Daly, Paul Adelstein, KaDee Strickland, Brian Benben, Caterina Scorsone, Taye Diggs, and Amy Brenneman all returned in their roles as series regulars. In September 2011, it was announced that My So Called Life actress, A.J. Langer, was cast as Erica Warner, a recurring role as a woman who shows up in Cooper's life proclaiming they have an eight-year-old son together. It was later announced that Griffin Gluck was cast as Mason Warner, the son that Cooper and Erica share together. Later in the season, Griffin was billed as a series regular, while A.J. stayed as a recurring character as her character died. In November 2011, it was announced that Stephen Amell had been cast as Scott Becker, a paramedic that was also a potential love interest for Violet, seeing as Violet and Pete decided to split up after Pete's heart attack.

In November 2011, Wes Brown had a recurring role as Ryan Kerrigan, a drug addict and a potential love interest for Amelia, but his character eventually dies pursuing Amelia to go to rehab. In November 2011, it was announced that, Jessie star, Debby Ryan would be making a special guest appearance, as Hailey, a girl that Amelia meets while she is going through rehab for drug addiction. In January 2012, it was announced that Private Practice and Grey's Anatomy would be having another crossover, and Patrick Dempsey and Chyler Leigh would be making a special guest appearance in an episode in an effort to save Erica's life. In February 2012, it was announced that Anika Noni Rose had been cast in a recurring role as Corinne Bennett, who would play Sam's sister who drops in town for a visit.

=== Development ===
On January 10, 2011, ABC renewed Private Practice for a fifth season. The fifth season premiered on September 29, 2011.

A plot device this season sees most episodes begin with Addison at a therapist's office introducing the episode while most but not all end with a redux of the plot device although Kate Walsh does not narrate the actual episodes. In the beginning of the season a major part of the story-line is Amelia's drug addiction, and how all of the doctors work to try to save her. Another story-line in the beginning of the season is the practice going under, and trying to save it and Violet trying to get her medical license back. A major story-line that has been in place since the fourth season, is Addison trying to have a baby with IVF treatments, but after the IVF treatments fail and she no longer has any eggs left, she decides to adopt a baby, eventually adopting a baby named Henry, who she delivered the very same day she was called about adopting him. A plot that took place for the entire season, is Cooper finding out that he has a son and that the mother, Erica Warner, has an inoperable brain tumor, and how Cooper and Charlotte must deal with the death of Erica and how it affects Mason. Through the middle of the season, Pete and Violet decide that they should go through separation; Violet tries to move on with a relationship with Scott, a paramedic she met, but the relationship eventually ends when Scott ends it and Violet decides to try to work things out with Pete. The addition of a new character, Jake Reilly, opened up the story-line of Addison trying to figure out if she wants to pursue a relationship with Sam or with Jake. After Amelias' drug addiction story-line, it's found out that Amelia is pregnant, and she has to deal with finding out that her baby (who was conceived while Amelia was actively using drugs) was developing without a brain and would not survive; she decides to carry it to term to donate the organs. Amelia also dealt with her anger at Addison while having Jake be her doctor.

== Cast and characters ==
=== Main cast ===
- Kate Walsh as Addison Montgomery
- Tim Daly as Pete Wilder
- Benjamin Bratt as Jake Reilly
- Paul Adelstein as Cooper Freedman
- KaDee Strickland as Charlotte King
- Brian Benben as Sheldon Wallace
- Caterina Scorsone as Amelia Shepherd
- Griffin Gluck as Mason Warner
- Taye Diggs as Sam Bennett
- Amy Brenneman as Violet Turner

=== Recurring cast ===
- A.J. Langer as Erica Warner
- Stephen Amell as Scott Becker
- Anika Noni Rose as Corinne Bennett
- Scott Alan Smith as Addison's Therapist
- Jack Bobo and Joey Bobo as Lucas Wilder
- Aloma Wright as Mildred Clemons
- Emily Rios as Angela Reilly
- Betsy Brandt as Joanna Gibbs
- Michael B. Silver as David Gibbs
- Wes Brown as Ryan Kerrigan
- Sydney Tamiia Poitier as Michelle
- Blue Deckert as Joe Price
- Myk Watford as Billy Douglas
- Emily Moss Wilson as Judi
- Billy John Malone as Hendricks

=== Special guest stars ===
- Patrick Dempsey as Derek Shepherd
- Chyler Leigh as Lexie Grey

=== Guest stars ===
- Patrick Fabian as Robert Weston
- Debby Ryan as Hailey

== Episodes ==
List of Private Practice season 5 episodes
| No. overall | No. in season | Title | Directed by | Written by | Original release date | US viewers (millions) |
|---|---|---|---|---|---|---|
| 77 | 1 | "God Laughs" | Mark Tinker | Craig Turk | September 29, 2011 | 7.79 |
Pete suffers a heart attack while at home with their son Lucas. Sheldon helps Amelia after she is injured in a bar fight. Sam and Addison are spending the night together, but both get paged to the ER on different cases. Charlotte remarks that Pete didn't show up for his shift at the hospital, so Cooper goes to Pete's house to check on him. He finds Pete collapsed on the floor and Lucas hiding under a table. While waiting for her flight to New York, Violet sees a couple fighting in the terminal and tries to counsel the wife. As Pete is being worked on in the cardiac cath lab, he begins showing symptoms of a brain bleed. An airport employee tracks down Violet with an emergency phone call about Pete; she rushes out of the terminal. Pete survives his surgery, but it was a close call. Charlotte tells Amelia that she refuses to enable her addiction and reminds Amelia that her hospital privileges are still suspended. Addison's fertility specialist is called away on an emergency, and his replacement turns out to be Dr. Jake Reilly--Addison's "supermarket mystery man.
| 78 | 2 | "Breaking the Rules" | Tom Verica | Steve Blackman | October 6, 2011 | 6.06 |
Pete comes back to the practice even with all of the doctors suggesting that he takes another week off. Sam, Addison, and Sheldon begin interviewing potential replacements for Naomi, including Jake Reilly, which freaks Addison out. Sheldon tries to convince Charlotte to let Amelia back at the hospital by making her take a breathalyzer test. Cooper illegally and secretly uses another family's cord blood to help a patient with leukemia, leaving Charlotte to clean up the legal mess. Addison finds that Sam and Jake know each other, while Pete begins taking his post-heart attack anger out on Violet who is acting as his therapist, nurse, and wife all the same time. Charlotte agrees to restore Amelia's hospital privileges if she'll take a breathalyzer test, while Addison decides to hire Jake. Violet tells Pete that he needs to get a therapist. Cooper is vindicated for his decision to break the law to save a patient's life. Amelia begins drinking again.
| 79 | 3 | "Deal With It" | Randy Zisk | Jennifer Cecil | October 13, 2011 | 6.51 |
Jake enlists Addison's help with a uterine transplant. Amelia and Sam try to help a woman with Parkinson's disease mask the symptoms, only to find that her meds are making her want to sleep with random men, and work to try to save her marriage and her life. Violet finds that typical maternal activities like play dates aren't really her thing; she makes a big change by cutting her hair very short. Amelia calls Charlotte a bitch in front of everyone and Charlotte is wounded that Cooper doesn't stand up for her. Addison and Jake find that the transplant surgery didn't work on their patient angering Jake, while Addison searches for the right doctor to begin her IVF treatment. Instead of going to a regular therapist, Pete begins going to Sheldon for advice, eventually not liking the realistic advice he gets; he wonders why he can't connect with Violet during sex, when he finds out that he can have it again. An old fling of Cooper's, Erica Warner, shows up and proclaims that she and Cooper have a child together. The practice gets renamed Seaside Health and Wellness.
| 80 | 4 | "Remember Me" | Mark Tinker | Barbie Kligman | October 20, 2011 | 6.38 |
After Cooper finds out that he has an eight-year-old son, Mason, he decides to meet him, but not tell him that he is his father yet; Addison and Violet get angered when a pregnant woman's husband decides that he is going to leave the woman and take the baby after she gives birth, because she can't remember anything because of a car accident less than a year ago. Pete continues to lash out at Violet, eventually making Violet lash back at him saying she needs him to be on her side, and be her husband instead of lashing out at him. Sam and Addison both worry about what will happen to their relationship when Addison begins IVF. Charlotte attempts to pay off Erica when she finds out about Mason, angering Erica and Cooper, because Cooper wants to be in Mason's life. After taking the paternity test without Erica or Cooper's permission, Charlotte finds that Cooper is Mason's biological father. Addison asks Sam if he would leave her. Addison's patient's husband doesn't leave her, but instead stays with her because of love. Sheldon tells Pete that he needs to stop lashing out at Violet.
| 81 | 5 | "Step One" | Ann Kindberg | Adele Lim | October 27, 2011 | 6.40 |
Addison starts IVF treatments with Jake and decides that she isn't going to tell Sam until she's pregnant. Amelia's friend, Michelle, comes back from Italy, and asks Amelia to help her commit suicide. Sam and Violet work on an old patient of Violet's who hears voices and has stopped taking his medication. Pete and Sheldon try to talk Amelia out of helping Michelle commit suicide. Violet agrees to not see her patient in order to get her license as a therapist back. Addison begins acting hormonal because of the IVF. Cooper begins spending more time with Mason and Erica, until Mason says that he doesn't want to see him anymore. Amelia decides to help her friend die and begins giving her the drugs necessary, until Michelle has an allergic reaction and Amelia calls 911. Michelle moves in with Amelia, and when Amelia comes back from the store she finds Michelle overdosed on her medication on purpose, and Amelia begins the path to drugs again. Mason asks Cooper if he's his father, while Addison tells Sam about her IVF treatments.
| 82 | 6 | "If I Hadn't Forgotten..." | Jeff Bleckner | Krista Vernoff | November 3, 2011 | 6.56 |
Amelia begins drinking and using drugs again after her friend Michelle killed herself. After confronting her, Charlotte starts to remember her past and how she coped with drug addiction. Addison tries to find a sperm donor, eventually enlisting all of the male doctors in the office to help her, only to find that she has little time to pick one because Jake finds that she has four eggs left, instead of the two she thought she originally had. Violet continues to try to get her medical license back by showing the court all of the patients that she has helped. Amelia begins a relationship with another addict, Ryan, (Wes Brown). Cooper continues to bond with Mason, while he tries to help a child whose parents are drugging him with ADHD medicine because they want him to get extra time on tests, so he can get straight A's. Charlotte confronts Amelia about her drug addiction, and Amelia quits the practice in an effort to get her to leave her alone. Cooper confronts the parents about drugging their child. Addison and Jake implant sperm into her eggs in an effort to get her pregnant.
| 83 | 7 | "Don't Stop 'Till You Get Enough" | Bethany Rooney | Fred Einesman | November 10, 2011 | 7.51 |
Sam, Jake, and Addison begin arguing on the procedure for a patient for a pregnant woman who got into a car accident and is now brain dead. Addison confronts Amelia about her drug addiction, forcing Amelia to go to a hotel room. Erica gets angry when she finds that Charlotte spent time with Mason, when she left Mason with Cooper since it was Mason's day off from school and Erica had to work. Violet gets her license reinstated and enlists Sheldon to oversee her therapy sessions as a requirement to get her full license back. Pete then confronts Sheldon when he believes that he is being too harsh on Violet. Amelia is confronted by the police when she breaks into the practice to steal her prescription notepad; Charlotte vouches for her and tries to convince Amelia to stop going down the path she's taking. Sheldon works to try to find Amelia after she goes AWOL. Addison gets implanted with the embryos in an effort to get pregnant. Erica agrees to let Mason sleep over with Charlotte and Cooper, after she finds that Charlotte was trying to protect Cooper when she tried to pay her off.
| 84 | 8 | "Who We Are" | Mark Tinker | Shonda Rhimes | November 17, 2011 | 7.23 |
All of the doctors are surprised and angry when Amelia finally shows up to work after twelve days, acting as if nothing ever happened, and find that she and Ryan are now engaged. The next day when Amelia arrives, she finds that they've planned an intervention for her; Amelia begins lashing out at everyone, and tries to leave multiple times. After requesting oxycodone so she'll stay, they put it to a vote, and majority voted no. After Amelia continues to chant "What do we want? Drugs! When do we want them? Now!" Addison and Sheldon decide to give her the oxycodone, but only if she would take it in front of everyone. Everyone begins talking to Amelia in an effort to convince her to go to rehab, but Ryan shows up and Addison finds that Amelia gave him her father's watch. Addison begins telling why the watch is significant and Amelia begins screaming at her. Later, Amelia and Ryan decide that they'll go to rehab and get married, but after they finish the drugs they have in the apartment. Jake goes to his late wife Lilly's grave. The next morning, Amelia wakes up to find that Ryan has died from an overdose and decides to go to rehab.
| 85 | 9 | "The Breaking Point" | Jeff Bleckner | Christopher Fife | November 17, 2011 | 7.23 |
Amelia begins her fifty-day rehab stint, and begins bonding with a fellow patient, Hailey (Debby Ryan). Addison and Violet begin to find ways that Addison can get pregnant, while Violet tries not to see everything that is wrong with her marriage. Cooper ends up missing Mason's first school play when one of his patients needs a blood transplant. Hailey tries to convince Amelia to accept that she didn't kill Ryan, that the drugs did. Addison's IVF fails, and when she tries to go for another round, she collapses from complications from the first IVF treatment. Violet realizes that Pete won't leave her and asks him to make a decision if he still loves her; after a week she finds that he doesn't love her anymore and leaves, but doesn't want to make anything difficult for Lucas. Sam tries to talk Addison out of another round of IVF but is too late, and she says that after this round she won't have anymore eggs left, and won't be able to do IVF anymore. All of the doctors arrive at the rehab facility as family is required to come, and Amelia said they were all family, and she tries to apologize for everything she did. Amelia returns home on Thanksgiving, while Addison is in the bathroom awaiting the results of her pregnancy test.
| 86 | 10 | "Are You My Mother?" | Ed Ornelas | Elizabeth J. B. Klaviter | January 5, 2012 | 7.71 |
Addison seeks out adoption when she finds out that there is no longer a chance of her getting pregnant, while Cooper tries to find out ways to discipline Mason when he finds that Mason shoplifted from a store. Violet and Pete decide that Pete should move out of the house, angering Pete because he wants to be in Lucas' life 24/7. Jake and Violet work with a three-person couple that want to get pregnant, but things get complicated when one of the women can't get pregnant, making the three of them decide on what is right for their relationship. Addison meets with a woman who is seeking someone to adopt her baby; later that day Addison gets paged to the delivery room where the woman gives birth. Charlotte takes Sheldon to the shooting gun range to help him get over Amelia, while she tries to convince Amelia that she's ready to get back to work. Addison is heart broken when the woman doesn't pick her to adopt her baby. Amelia begins to realize how much she hurt everyone she loved. Violet and Pete realize that they're going to have to adjust to being divorced. Addison and Sam decide to break up.
| 87 | 11 | "The Standing Eight Count" | Scott Printz | Zahir McGhee | January 12, 2012 | 6.55 |
The male doctors at the practice have a "boys night out", which ends with Pete and Sam both going home with different women; Sheldon questions his friendship with a cop, when he asks if he can sign off on a cop with PTSD going back to work. After Amelia begins worrying about Erica's heath, Charlotte looks into her medical records, and finds that she has a tumor in her brain that is going to eventually kill her. Violet accepts a date with a paramedic, Scott (Stephen Amell); While Addison begins wondering what her options are if she doesn't want to adopt a baby, or a woman doesn't want her to adopt her baby. Erica threatens to leave if Charlotte tells Cooper about her tumor, only for her to show up at their apartment and tell Cooper about her tumor; While Pete tells Violet about his night with the woman he met at the bar. Charlotte begins to realize that she's growing fonder of Mason; While Sam and Addison struggle to stay friends after their break up; Jake tries to reassure Addison that she will have a baby.
| 88 | 12 | "Losing Battles" | Stephen Cragg | Gabriel Llanas | January 19, 2012 | 6.00 |
Just as Violet is preparing to take the "next step" with Scott, Joann, the abused woman she met at the airport six months earlier, arrives in need of urgent medical care. Cooper and Amelia begin searching to see if there is anything that could help Erica live a longer life. Sheldon and Sam begin online dating in an effort to find women. As Addison begins looking for surrogates, she and Jake find that no one is up to Addison's standards. Amelia offers to be her surrogate, but Addison turns her down, wanting Amelia to heal and stay sober. Cooper tries to make sure after Erica dies that Mason will be with him and Charlotte. After Erica asks Amelia what she would do, Erica decides not to have any further treatment since she believes it won't be worth it. Violet decides to take Joanna to her house and take care of her. Joanna's husband David breaks into Violet's house and knocks Violet unconscious. When Violet wakes up she finds that Joanna stabbed David to death.
| 89 | 13 | "The Time Has Come" | Mark Tinker | Jennifer Cecil | February 2, 2012 | 6.55 |
Pete gets upset when Scott drops by Violet's house while Lucas is there, and he tells Violet that Scott can't be around the house. While at the ER, Charlotte and Pete discover that the car accident victims who come in are Mason and Erica, but luckily they are not badly injured. Sam and Sheldon try to deal with an army veteran who can't have sex with his wife, only for Sheldon to discover that the army vet was raped by his superior, and Sheldon seeks help from Violet. Cooper gets enraged when he finds out about Erica and Mason's accident and demands that she never drives with Mason again. Violet tries to convince Cooper that he's angry that Erica is dying. Sheldon helps the army veteran tell his wife about his rape. Addison and Jake go to a medical conference, and Addison gets drunk and pursues Jake, but tells her she isn't ready for sex. Charlotte and Amelia try to help Erica cope with her terminal illness. Violet takes the next step with Scott after she finds that Pete is jealous. Sam gets a call and finds that his sister robbed a convenience store and goes to pick her up from the police station.
| 90 | 14 | "Too Much" | Karen Gaviola | Noah Evslin | February 9, 2012 | 6.52 |
Sam finds his estranged sister, Corinne, in jail, heavily medicated and near-catatonic, and brings her to Sheldon for help, while Sam, Addison, and Pete work on a baby who has a mother who has a drug problem. Erica begins secret chemotherapy treatments, forcing Charlotte and Cooper to keep Mason in the dark. Amelia begins more research on Erica's case and finds a lead, and realizes that Derek is the person to help them; Charlotte tries to talk Erica into telling Mason about her gliosarcoma, after he runs off and demands that Charlotte bring him to Erica. Violet gets pissed when Cooper begins defending Pete on her relationship with Scott; While Addison has sex with Sam. Sam and Sheldon try to find out what is really wrong with Corrine, and Sheldon finds that she might not have all of the problems that the prison doctors said she has. Addison and Jake find it hard to talk to each other after he rejected sex with her; Erica, Amelia, Charlotte, Mason, and Cooper head to Seattle in a last effort to give her more time with Mason.
| 91 | 15 | "You Break My Heart" | Allison Liddi-Brown | Steve Blackman & Craig Turk | February 16, 2012 | 7.08 |
Cooper and Charlotte take Erica to Seattle Grace-Mercy West, so Amelia can team up with Derek (Patrick Dempsey) and Lexie (Chyler Leigh) in an attempt to perform a surgery that requires them to work within ninety seconds. Sheldon begins wondering if Corrine has bi-polar disorder; While Sam and Jake get into an argument over the treatment of a patient who had a heart transplant and Jake proceeded to get her pregnant, before he got to the practice. Violet begins to worry when Scott wants to take their relationship to the next level. Meanwhile, Erica is finally forced to tell Mason why they are really in Seattle. Corrine is outraged when Sam blames her for all of his problems only for Sheldon to diagnose her with bi-polar disorder, and she finally comes clean with where she's been for twenty years. Derek, Lexie, and Amelia are able to perform Erica's surgery in the ninety seconds that they have to. Addison, Sam, and Jake aren't able to save their patient because she stopped taking her heart medication, but are able to save the baby. Violet tells Scott that their relationship has to be just sex; while Jake questions Addison and his relationship. This episode concludes a crossover with Grey's Anatomy that begins on "Have You Seen Me Lately?".
| 92 | 16 | "Andromeda" | Mark Tinker | Gabe Fonseca | February 23, 2012 | 6.32 |
Addison deals with a patient who has to choose between having a surgery that could kill one of her twins, or not perform the surgery and lose the other twin. Sam finds that Corrine is becoming more than he can handle. Violet and Scott start becoming distant, while Charlotte and Cooper begin arguing after Erica's surgery because Cooper is always at Erica's house trying to take care of her and Mason. Sheldon begins worrying that Amelia might be on drugs again, only to find out that Amelia's about twenty weeks pregnant. Corrine has an outburst and when Sam tries to calm her down she falls through the window, forcing Sam to realize he can't take care of her. Addison performs the babies surgery just fine. Violet wants to start therapy with Pete so they can work on their marriage, and tries to show Cooper that he's taking his frustration out on Charlotte. Jake reveals to Addison that he has feelings for her, while Sheldon tries to convince Sam to put Corrine in a facility, but Sam decides he can take care of her himself.
| 93 | 17 | "The Letting Go" | Paul Adelstein | Barbie Kligman | March 15, 2012 | 6.85 |
Jake goes to visit his step-daughter Angela at her college, and finds out that she had sex for the first time, and accidentally tells her about Addison. Scott ends up in the hospital after a drunk husband beats him up after they try to help the battered wife. Sheldon begins convincing Amelia that she needs to tell Addison about her pregnancy, so she can get the right prenatal care. After Sam is forced to give Corrine her pills, he calls Sheldon and realizes that Corrine would be better suited in a facility where they can give her the therapy and support that she needs, after Corrine confesses that she would rather not be on earth. Cooper and Charlotte get a phone call from a frightened Mason and rush to the hospital with Amelia to find that Erica's condition has worsened and that there are now more tumors. Charlotte and Cooper are then forced to tell Mason that Erica only has one week left to live, and Erica decides after that day she doesn't want to see Mason so he can remember her healthy. After Amelia tells Addison she's pregnant, Addison proclaims she's excited for her.
| 94 | 18 | "It Was Inevitable" | Bill Purple | Adele Lim & Christopher Fife | April 17, 2012 | 6.53 |
As Erica's life starts slowly coming to an end, Cooper and Charlotte try to convince her that she should let Mason see her, while they also try to convince Mason that Erica isn't going to be leaving the hospital. Addison tries to show Amelia that having a baby is one of the most wonderful things in the world, when Amelia continues to put off an ultrasound. Violet and Pete begin their relationship again, or attempt to, but don't because neither of them knows how the other feels. Sheldon and Jake argue over a pregnant woman who nearly six months ago killed her first two children, as Sheldon believes that the woman wasn't diagnosed with postpartum depression, and that it wasn't her fault, while Jake feels that she is a cold blooded killer and she shouldn't be allowed out of jail. After Erica realizes that she has no time left, she agrees to let Mason see her, just as Mason comes in and hugs Erica and says 'I love you', Erica dies. Amelia agrees to an ultrasound; Sheldon gets a call and says he's going to go see his ex-wife, after he promised Amelia he'd be there for her. Sam feels bad for putting Corrine in the facility. Addison gets a call that a woman picked Addison to be the adoptive parent of her baby.
| 95 | 19 | "And Then There Was One" | Tom Verica | Jennifer Cecil & Elizabeth J. B. Klaviter | April 24, 2012 | 8.13 |
After Amelia gets the devastating news that her baby has no brain she can't will herself to talk to anyone at the practice; Violet and Pete decide to go to marriage counseling to see if they can fix their marriage. Jake and Sam find out that they both kissed Addison on the same day, but when Sam confronts her, she states that she only really has time for Henry, the newborn baby boy she adopted. Pete, Violet, and Amelia work on the case of a young girl who was stabbed to death; as Violet begins talking to the sister, Missy, Violet begins to believe that she was the one who stabbed her sister, eventually getting the truth out of her. Violet and Pete go from being polite in therapy to bickering at each other; Charlotte and Cooper must deal with Mason who wets the bed, and now doesn't talk to anyone after Erica's death. Amelia enlist Jake to be her new OBGYN, after firing Addison, and decides that she wants to stay healthy and donate her baby's organs to other children, so she can help other children. Everyone worries where Sheldon has disappeared, while Addison adjusts to being a new mother.
| 96 | 20 | "True Colors" | Steve Robin | Craig Turk & Steve Blackman | May 1, 2012 | 7.38 |
Violet and Pete quit therapy, even though Violet doesn't want to, and Pete believes dating Violet would be the best for them to get their marriage back to what it was; While Sam begins to realize he still feels obligated to help Addison with Henry even though they aren't in a relationship anymore. Violet and Cooper deal with a patient who believes that they were born in the wrong body, and try help the parents deal with what their kid is trying to tell them. While Cooper grows angry at Charlotte because Mason will talk to her and not listen to him, seeing as he is his father; Addison and Pete work with an illegal immigrant who is trying to have her baby born in the United States so he can stay when she's deported. After realizing what's best, Addison delivers the baby, but when the woman is explaining to Pete about his hospital he built, he decides that he should go back there to help rebuild it. Mason begins talking to Cooper again; While Amelia makes the heart breaking decision of signing the papers, effectively giving her baby's organs to other children when he's born.
| 97 | 21 | "Drifting Back" | Jeannot Szwarc | Gabriel Llanas & Zahir McGhee | May 8, 2012 | 5.77 |
Sheldon returns from his trip with his ex-wife, and is baffled when everyone except Amelia welcomes him back with a warm welcome; Pete, Sam and Charlotte deal with a patient whose father wants to keep him on life support, but whose partner wants to take him off life support. Amelia gets her six-month chip, but Jake begins to worry that she may be looking to do drugs to keep her pain away; While Addison and Sam have trouble defining their relationship. Violet, Amelia and Sheldon work with a father who is having feelings about having sex with his daughter, only find that scarring in his brain is the reason, and Amelia performs surgery in hopes that his feelings will go away. After Sheldon confronts Amelia, she says she wants to have sex with him, but leaves after he continues to say he's sorry; Jake tells Amelia about how his wife died from an overdose. Pete honors his patient's wishes and takes his partner off life support, and faces major legal trouble and Charlotte is forced to turn him into the police when she finds out; While Violet looks into selling their house.
| 98 | 22 | "Gone, Baby, Gone" | Ann Kindberg | Shonda Rhimes | May 15, 2012 | 6.81 |
All of the doctors of Seaside Health and Wellness go to Amelia's aid when she begins labor, but everyone is forced to put their personal feelings aside when Jake tells them that Amelia wanted to give her baby's organs up to other babies. After Pete's hearing he is held in jail without bond; Charlotte is faced with talking to the lawyers about Amelia's surgery even though she doesn't believe in it. As Amelia begins reaching time to push the baby out, she begins pleading that she doesn't want to deliver the 'unicorn baby'. After hearing Amelia in pain, Addison goes into help her; Sam signs off on help with the heart transplant, but Charlotte tells them that the lawyers said no, but they go ahead with the surgery anyway. Mason asks Charlotte if she'd be okay with him calling her "mama", but doesn't want to call her mom because he already has a mom. Addison and Jake sleep with each other after Amelia's surgery; While Sheldon tells Amelia that she's his best friend. Pete gets out of jail on bail; Sam proposes to Addison, proclaiming he's ready to have a family with her.

== Ratings ==
=== Live ratings ===
| No. in Series | No. in Season | Episode | Air Date | Timeslot (EST) | Rating/Share (18–49) | Viewers (m) | Weekly Rank (m) |
|---|---|---|---|---|---|---|---|
| 77 | 1 | "God Laughs" | September 29, 2011 | Thursdays; 10:00 p.m. | 2.8/8 | 7.79 | TBA |
| 78 | 2 | "Breaking the Rules" | October 6, 2011 | Thursdays; 10:00 p.m. | 2.1/5 | 6.06 | TBA |
| 79 | 3 | "Deal With It" | October 13, 2011 | Thursdays; 10:00 p.m. | 2.3/6 | 6.51 | TBA |
| 80 | 4 | "Remember Me" | October 20, 2011 | Thursdays; 10:00 p.m. | 2.3/6 | 6.38 | TBA |
| 81 | 5 | "Step One" | October 27, 2011 | Thursdays; 10:00 p.m. | 2.4/6 | 6.59 | TBA |
| 82 | 6 | "If I Hadn't Forgotten..." | November 3, 2011 | Thursdays; 10:00 p.m. | 2.6/7 | 6.56 | TBA |
| 83 | 7 | "Don't Stop 'Till You Get Enough" | November 10, 2011 | Thursdays; 10:00 p.m. | 2.8/7 | 7.51 | TBA |
| 84 | 8 | "Who We Are" | November 17, 2011 | Thursdays; 10:00 p.m. | 2.6/7 | 7.23 | TBA |
| 85 | 9 | "The Breaking Point" | November 17, 2011 | Thursdays; 10:00 p.m. | 2.6/7 | 7.23 | TBA |
| 86 | 10 | "Are You My Mother?" | January 5, 2012 | Thursdays; 10:00 p.m. | 2.7/7 | 7.71 | TBA |
| 87 | 11 | "The Standing Eight Count" | January 12, 2012 | Thursdays; 10:00 p.m. | 2.3/6 | 6.55 | TBA |
| 88 | 12 | "Losing Battles" | January 19, 2012 | Thursdays; 10:00 p.m. | 2.1/5 | 6.00 | TBA |
| 89 | 13 | "The Time Has Come" | February 2, 2012 | Thursdays; 10:00 p.m. | 2.3/6 | 6.55 | TBA |
| 90 | 14 | "Too Much" | February 9, 2012 | Thursdays; 10:00 p.m. | 2.2/6 | 6.52 | TBA |
| 91 | 15 | "You Break My Heart" | February 16, 2012 | Thursdays; 10:00 p.m. | 2.6/7 | 7.08 | TBA |
| 92 | 16 | "Andromeda" | February 23, 2012 | Thursdays; 10:00 p.m. | 2.1/6 | 6.32 | TBA |
| 93 | 17 | "The Letting Go" | March 15, 2012 | Thursdays; 10:00 p.m. | 2.1/6 | 6.85 | TBA |
| 94 | 18 | "It Was Inevitable" | April 17, 2012 | Tuesdays; 10:00 p.m. | 1.7/5 | 6.53 | TBA |
| 95 | 19 | "And Then There Was One" | April 24, 2012 | Tuesdays; 10:00 p.m. | 2.2/6 | 8.13 | #22 |
| 96 | 20 | "True Colors" | May 1, 2012 | Tuesdays; 10:00 p.m. | 2.1/6 | 7.38 | TBA |
| 97 | 21 | "Drifting Back" | May 8, 2012 | Tuesdays; 10:00 p.m. | 1.4/4 | 5.77 | TBA |
| 98 | 22 | "Gone, Baby, Gone" | May 15, 2012 | Tuesdays; 10:00 p.m. | 1.8/5 | 6.81 | TBA |

== DVD release ==
Private Practice: The Complete Fifth Season
| Set Details | | Special Features |
| 22 Episodes; 5-Disc Set; English (Dolby Digital 5.1 Surround); Audio Commentaries | | The Practice Of Parenthood- Filmmakers and cast discuss the addition of children to the series this season, the different kinds of family the show explores, and how being a parent affects the cast, both as actors and in their person lives.; Deleted Scenes; Bloopers |
Release Dates
| Region 1 | Region 2 | Region 4 |
| September 11, 2012 | February 4, 2013 | November 14, 2012 |
