= Did You Hear What Happened to Charlotte King? =

- Private Practice episode
- Episode no.: Season 4 Episode 7
- Directed by: Allison Liddi-Brown
- Written by: Shonda Rhimes
- Original air date: November 4, 2010
- Running time: 43 minutes

Guest appearances
- Nicholas Brendon as Lee McHenry; Blue Deckert as Joe Price

Episode chronology
| ← Previous "All in the Family" | Next → "What Happens Next" |
- Private Practice (season 4)

"Did You Hear What Happened to Charlotte King?" is the seventh episode of the fourth season of the American television medical drama Private Practice and the show's 61st episode overall. Written by Shonda Rhimes and directed by Allison Liddi-Brown, the episode was originally broadcast on ABC in the United States on November 4, 2010. Private Practice centers on a group of young doctors working in a private medical practice, and this episode deals with the immediate aftermath of Charlotte King's rape.

The episode, written in collaboration with the Rape, Abuse & Incest National Network (RAINN), revolved around KaDee Strickland's character, Charlotte, and was intended to accurately portray a victim's recovery from rape. Nicholas Brendon guest-starred as Lee McHenry, and Blue Deckert appeared as detective Joe Price. "Did You Hear What Happened to Charlotte King?" earned Rhimes, Strickland, and the series several awards and nominations and was well received by critics, with Strickland's character and performance praised. The initial broadcast was viewed by 10.18 million people, received a 3.9/11 Nielsen rating/share in the 18–49 demographic, and had the fifth-highest number of viewers that night.

== Plot ==
Alternative-medicine specialist Dr. Pete Wilder (Tim Daly) finds St. Ambrose Hospital chief of staff Charlotte King (KaDee Strickland) hiding in a supply closet after she was raped in her office. He examines her, diagnosing a broken wrist, eye socket and nose and a deep arm laceration, and admits her to the hospital. Charlotte lies to Pete, telling him that she was injured in a mugging. Pete calls the police; Charlotte attempts to contact her boyfriend, Dr. Cooper Freedman (Paul Adelstein), but cannot reach him because he is out drinking with Dr. Amelia Shepherd (Caterina Scorsone) and Dr. Sam Bennett (Taye Diggs). At the police station psychiatrist Sheldon Wallace (Brian Benben) interrogates Lee McHenry (Nicholas Brendon), who was found with blood on his clothes. After nurses photograph Charlotte's injuries, Dr. Addison Montgomery (Kate Walsh) realizes that Charlotte was raped and offers her a rape kit. During her pelvic examination, Charlotte refuses the rape kit and tells Addison not to tell anyone else about the rape. Cooper arrives with Amelia and Sam and is surprised at the extent of Charlotte's injuries. During the CT scan, Charlotte and Amelia bond over their shared drug addiction when Charlotte refuses pain medication. Amelia admits drinking alcohol again, and Charlotte offers to take her to Alcoholics Anonymous meetings. Amelia sutures Charlotte's wounds, which causes Charlotte great pain; Cooper feels powerless, unable to protect her.

Interviewed by Sheldon, Lee admits being angry after discovering his girlfriend's infidelity but denies that the blood on his clothing is hers. Addison tries to convince Charlotte to report her rape; Charlotte refuses, telling Addison that she does not understand what it is like to be raped. Pete uses alternative medicine to help Charlotte deal with her pain. Psychiatrist Violet Turner (Amy Brenneman) refuses to talk to Charlotte about the rape because of similarities to the fetal abduction she experienced a year earlier, and wonders if everyone in the practice is cursed. Sam wants to go home and rest, which angers Addison. Charlotte attempts to compose a memorandum saying that she was attacked on the hospital grounds, but Cooper suggests that another member of the staff do it for her; she shouts at Cooper when he calls her a victim. After the argument, Cooper goes to Charlotte's office and weeps when he sees the aftermath of her assault. Lee admits to raping a woman, assaulting Sheldon before he is pulled away by the police. In the ambulance bay, Sam expresses his confusion about Addison's mood swings and suspects that she is hiding something from him; Addson asks him to promise never to leave her alone. After Cooper helps her dress, Charlotte says that she loves him and wants to go home. Lee is held by the police for assaulting a police officer during his arrest and Sheldon during his interrogation, but detective Joe Price says that Lee cannot be charged with rape until charges are filed against him. Charlotte walks out of the hospital with Cooper's help; flashbacks of the rape reveal that Lee was the rapist.

== Production ==
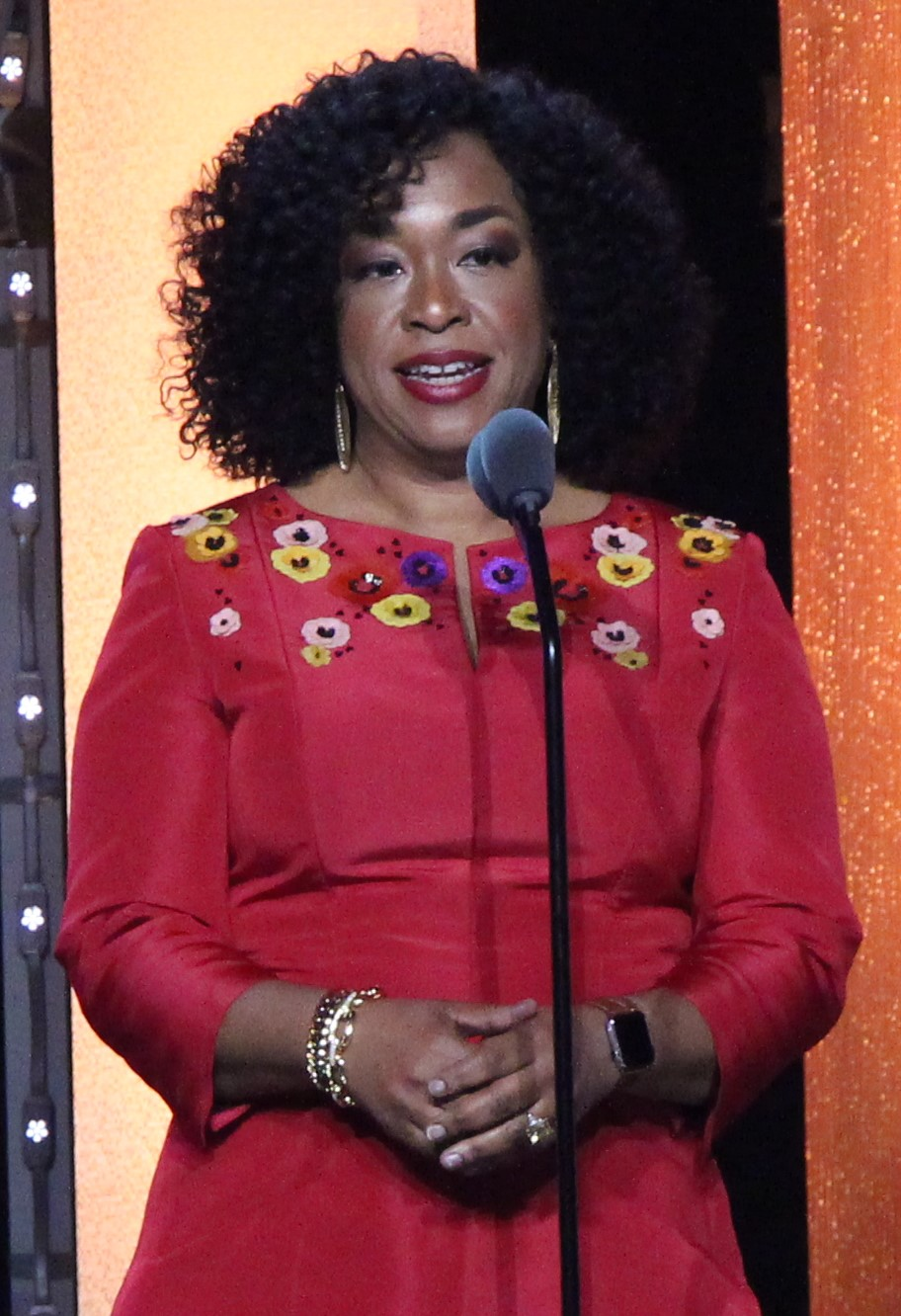
Writer Shonda Rhimes described the episode as one of her favorites from the series, noting that it significantly improved her approach to writing.

The 43-minute episode was written by series creator Shonda Rhimes and directed by Allison Liddi-Brown, with Christal A. Khatib editing the music and Gregory Van Horn serving as production designer. Johann Sebastian Bach's Prelude and Fugue in C is featured in the opening sequence. Rhimes collaborated with the Rape, Abuse & Incest National Network (RAINN) to accurately depict Charlotte King's (KaDee Strickland) recovery from rape, later describing the episode as one of her favorites and noting that it changed her approach as a writer.

Strickland, who portrayed Charlotte, agreed to the storyline on the condition that it would extend beyond a single episode and have a significant impact on the character. Strickland praised the script for humanizing victims and aimed to create a realistic portrayal. In preparation, she consulted with RAINN representatives and visited the Rape Treatment Center at UCLA Santa Monica Medical Center, which influenced her performance. Strickland also researched the reactions of survivors and their families. The decision to portray Charlotte's resistance to reporting her rape was made in consultation with the Rape Treatment Center, with Strickland defending it as essential for the character's development. The episode primarily focused on Charlotte's psychological response to the assault. According to Strickland,

The nature of that kind of attack is so shocking to a person's system a lot of times that how they respond in those first moments afterwards, it could go six ways to Sunday. For Charlotte, because of the type of person she is, very in control, very direct, very together, I think it really turns her world upside down, and I think she doesn't really know how to even comprehend what has happened to her or how to process it.

— KaDee Strickland, Zap2It

Strickland described filming the rape scene as less challenging than portraying its aftermath, which she called "psychologically and physically hard". She and Nicholas Brendon, who played Lee McHenry, agreed on a safeword during the rape scene due to its brutality. Strickland found it difficult to act on the set where the rape scene was filmed, calling the process "intense" and "truthful", but emphasized that it could not compare to the real experiences of survivors. Brendon, primarily known for his comedic role as Xander Harris in Buffy the Vampire Slayer, was cast against type as Lee. Strickland noted that his character should not be seen as "crazy", as perpetrators of rape are often people "around us all the time", and called Brendon's acceptance of the role "brave".

According to Strickland, Charlotte's rape affected every character on the show. The episode explored Cooper Freedman's (Paul Adelstein) response as the partner of a rape victim, with Adelstein describing his character as "a conscious 21st-century male" in his interactions with Charlotte. Strickland also mentioned that Addison Montgomery’s (Kate Walsh) decision to use a rape kit on Charlotte without her consent would become a major storyline in the future. Violet Turner (Amy Brenneman) would also play a key role in pushing Charlotte to seek help, as both characters had endured similar traumatic experiences.

== Broadcast history and release ==
"Did You Hear What Happened to Charlotte King?" was originally broadcast on November 4, 2010, in the United States on ABC. The episode attracted 10.18 million viewers, marking a 44% increase from the previous episode, "All in the Family", which had an average rating of 7.68 million. Although it ranked #5 for the night, behind CBS's The Big Bang Theory, $#*! My Dad Says, CSI: Crime Scene Investigation and The Mentalist, it led the 10:00 PM Eastern time slot with a 3.9/11 Nielsen rating in the 18–49 demographic. Due to the episode's violent content, it was aired with a viewer discretion advisory message. The following episode, "What Happens Next", saw a ratings decline, drawing 8.21 million viewers.

The episode was included on the DVD release of the fourth season on September 13, 2011, in the United States. A behind-the-scenes feature, "An Inside Look: The Violation of Charlotte King", was included in the fourth-season DVD and Blu-ray releases. The episode was also made available for purchase on Amazon Prime Video, Apple TV+, and Fandango at Home and for streaming on Hulu and Disney+.

== Critical reception ==
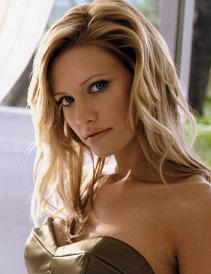
KaDee Strickland's performance as Charlotte King received widespread acclaim by television critics.

"Did You Hear What Happened to Charlotte King?" was cited as one of the best television episodes of 2010 by TV Guide and the Futon Critic. Strickland's performance received an overwhelmingly positive response after the episode first aired. A reviewer from TV Guide felt that Strickland's performance was worthy of an Emmy, and that the first time Cooper saw Charlotte's injuries was "like we weren't even watching TV anymore". A TVLine critic later listed Strickland as one of the Emmy Awards' 21 biggest snubs. E! News' Kristin dos Santos also praised Strickland's portrayal of Charlotte, writing that she deserved an Emmy nomination, and Winston Mize of SpoilerTV wrote that Strickland was "robbed. of. all. the. awards". TV Fanatic's Steve Marsi liked the episode, saying that its pacing and Strickland's performance immersed the audience despite the difficult subject matter.

The treatment of rape in the episode has been widely praised by television critics. SpoilerTV's Winston Mize felt that it was one of Rhimes' best shows, and that it avoided a preachy or excessively-dramatic take on rape. JeromeWetzelTV of Blogcritics found the episode "disturbing, intense, tragic, and moving", with the rape handled delicately and responsibly. E! News' Jennifer Arrow described the rape scene as "the most realistic depiction of rape in media history" and noted Brendon's casting as an evil character in contrast with his more light-hearted performance as Harris in Buffy the Vampire Slayer.

The depiction of Charlotte's rape and its aftermath was compared to similar storylines on other shows. Arrow called it part of the "rape-on-TV trend", linking Charlotte's rape with those of Gemma Teller Morrow of FX's crime drama Sons of Anarchy and Naomi Clark of the CW teen drama 90210. According to Arrow, all three characters were "strong, no-nonsense ladies who generally dominate their environments" and did not report their rape. She asked if each show's decision for the victim not to report the rape was part of a larger cultural belief that "trusts in women who keep their silence". TV Fanatic's Steve Marsi called the episode reminiscent of Law & Order: Special Victims Unit in its presentation of events in real time and emphasis on character reactions.

== Awards and impact ==
"Did You Hear What Happened to Charlotte King?" was cited at the 2011 Television Academy Honors for exemplifying "Television with a Conscience". The Academy of Television Arts & Sciences praised the episode for "master[ing] the gut-wrenching crime of sexual assault". Private Practice received the award in 2010 for its approach to physician-assisted suicide in the second-season episode, "Nothing to Fear", and a drama-series Women's Image Network Award at the 13th annual WIN awards. "Did You Hear What Happened to Charlotte King?" was a finalist for the Sentinel for Health Award for Primetime Drama (Major Storyline) for its representation of rape, losing to the Parenthood episode "Qualities and Difficulties" (which focused on Asperger syndrome). The show was nominated for the PRISM Award for Drama Series Multi-Episode Storyline (Mental Health) for "Did You Hear What Happened to Charlotte King?" and the following episodes, "What Happens Next" and "Can't Find My Way Back Home", losing to the first two seasons of Parenthood.

Rhimes and Strickland received a RAINN Hope Award in recognition of "their efforts in educating the public about sexual assault prevention". Strickland said that she considered submitting the episode, or the later episodes "Can't Find My Way Home" or "Blind Love," for consideration at the 63rd Primetime Emmy Awards, but she did not receive a nomination. The actress received the Female Performance in a Drama Series Multi-Episode Storyline award at the 2011 PRISM Awards. Rhimes received the NAACP Image Award for Outstanding Writing in a Dramatic Series at the 2011 NAACP Awards for her work on the episode.

After its broadcast, RAINN had a "500-percent increase in service requests" (which temporarily crashed its website). Strickland participated in a public service announcement to increase awareness of rape and sexual abuse, and said that she had received many emails from survivors of sexual assault. RAINN called Strickland "vocal advocate for using DNA evidence in solving rape cases" for her work on the episode.
