= Private Practice season 4 =

Private Practice
- Season 4
- DVD cover art
- Starring: Kate Walsh; Tim Daly; Audra McDonald; Paul Adelstein; KaDee Strickland; Brian Benben; Caterina Scorsone; Taye Diggs; Amy Brenneman
- No. of episodes: 22

Release
- Original network: ABC
- Original release: September 23, 2010 – May 19, 2011

Season chronology
- ← Previous; Season 3 Next → Season 5

The fourth season of Private Practice premiered on September 23, 2010, and concluded on May 19, 2011. The season consisted of 22 episodes.

== Plot ==
Addison and Sam continue their relationship, and eventually hit a rough patch when Addison decides that she wants a baby, and Sam doesn't want one because he already has Maya and Olivia. Addison's life gets complicated when she is forced to sit by her mother's wife's side and watch her die, because of the DNR, and is faced with the repercussions when her mother commits suicide. After going to therapy, Addison decides that she needs to take her life in a new direction, and not do everything that she always does, and meets a man at the super-market. She begins seeing the man, but doesn't know who he is and eventually agrees to go to Fiji with him, until she goes back to Sam and rekindles their relationship but says that she still wants a baby. Naomi inherits millions from her boyfriend William White following his death. On top of having to deal with his death, Naomi also has to deal with the fact that her best friend and ex-husband are in a real relationship now. She is easing well into her new role as a grandmother, even though she was less than thrilled to find out her 16-year-old daughter Maya was pregnant. Naomi eventually admits that she isn't happy with where her life is at the moment and makes a decision to find her purpose elsewhere. Sam and Addison are still dating but are at different points in their lives. Addison wants a child, but Sam has a child and a grandchild so he would rather just enjoy their time together and put off having kids indefinitely. Sam's biggest challenge is that he is in a relationship with Addison but she is pulling away, so he ends up kissing Naomi which leads him to believe that maybe there is still a chance for a romantic relationship between them. Naomi's head is elsewhere so neither women (Addison or Naomi) is actually on the same page as him.

Cooper and Charlotte are forced to deal with the aftermaths of Charlotte's rape, but Cooper doesn't know about the rape until long after it has happened. After being raped Charlotte decides not to tell Cooper, or the police, but soon after hearing Violet's rape story she finds that she needs to come clean and decides to tell Cooper about everything. Cooper and Charlotte are faced with not being able to prosecute the rapist when her lawyer states everything was thrown out when she lied. Cooper and Charlotte try to get their lives back together, including their sex lives, but are forced to put it on hold when Charlotte can't even be touched because of the assault. Charlotte is again faced with her attacker, when he comes into the hospital after getting stabbed, but eventually puts everything to peace when she forgives him; At Bizzy and Susan's wedding they find that they are finally able to have sex again. While things at their own wedding get interesting when their parents decided they shouldn't get married only for Cooper and Charlotte to get married in Vegas. Following Pete's proposal these two finally get married and start to raise their child together. Violet gets a book deal, the details of which offend her friends and colleagues. Pete's past catches up with her when his brother comes to him telling him that their mother (who is in prison) needs his help. Violet pushes Pete to help his mother and through Pete's interaction with his mother details of his childhood are revealed. Sheldon continues to be the resident "therapist" to all his friends and colleagues. Everyone comes to him for advice so he is like their guardian angel who calmly pushes them all in the right direction. He starts an affair with a writer who gave Violet's new book a bad review despite the warning from Cooper that the affair is going to jeopardise his friendship with Violet. It is revealed that Amelia is a recovering substance abuser and that the reason she started in the first place was due to her father getting shot, which left her feeling empty and so she turned to drugs. She finally mends her relationship with her brother Derek Shepherd following his survival of a gunshot wound. She is currently helping her friend deal with a fatal disease.

== Cast and characters ==
=== Main cast ===
- Kate Walsh as Addison Montgomery
- Tim Daly as Pete Wilder
- Audra McDonald as Naomi Bennett
- Paul Adelstein as Cooper Freedman
- KaDee Strickland as Charlotte King
- Brian Benben as Sheldon Wallace
- Caterina Scorsone as Amelia Shepherd
- Taye Diggs as Sam Bennett
- Amy Brenneman as Violet Turner

=== Recurring cast ===
- Nicholas Brendon as Lee McHenry
- Cristián de la Fuente as Dr. Eric Rodriguez
- JoBeth Williams as Bizzy Montgomery
- Michael Patrick Thornton as Gabriel Fife
- Hailey Sole as Betsey Parker
- Amanda Foreman as Katie Kent
- Ann Cusack as Susan Grant
- Alex Kingston as Marla Tompkins
- Grant Show as Archer Montgomery
- Stephen Collins as "The Captain" Montgomery
- Stephen Lunsford as Filmore "Dink" Davis
- Louise Fletcher as Frances Wilder
- Kyle Secor as Adam Wilder
- Blue Deckert as Joe Price
- Myk Watford as Billy Douglas
- Michael Bofshever as Neal Chaplin
- Sydney Tamiia Poitier as Michelle

=== Special guest stars ===
- Benjamin Bratt as Jake Reilly

=== Guest stars ===
- French Stewart as Kevin Mason
- Currie Graham as Ryan Mason
- Tess Harper as Augusta King
- Michael Badalucco as Nick

== Episodes ==
List of Private Practice season 4 episodes
No. overall	No. in season	Title	Directed by	Written by	Original release date	US viewers (millions)
55	1	"Take Two"	Mark Tinker	Craig Turk & Steve Blackman	September 23, 2010	8.83
When all of the doctors gather to see Dell's new headstone Violet announces that she and Pete are getting married, making Cooper uncertain about his and Violet's friendship. Charlotte and Sam work on a patient who needs a kidney transplant. When they suggest his brother, they find that his brother is mentally challenged and Charlotte worries about the ethics of the case. Naomi and Sheldon work to get Addison to help a case of a couple trying to get pregnant after losing their first child two years earlier. Amelia contemplates going to see Derek (or not) after he is shot. Sam works to get Dink to step up and start helping Naomi out with Olivia and Maya; Violet and Pete get married, while Sheldon shows Charlotte that he doesn't want to be her friend anymore after she chooses Cooper over him. Addison and Sam start their relationship over again; Charlotte and Cooper begin working on plans for their wedding.
56	2	"Short Cuts"	Mark Tinker	Sonay Washington	September 30, 2010	7.93
When William White passes away, Naomi decides that they should combine the two practices. Charlotte and Pete decide that Violet and Cooper need to spend less time with each other for both of their relationships to survive. Charlotte gets Sheldon to help her with a patient who is trying to get a sex change, but gets angry when Sheldon denies her patient the surgery. Addison decides that she and Sam can't keep their relationship a secret, and tries to tell Naomi, but doesn't until the end of the day, resulting in Naomi telling her to back her up with the merger. Addison also pushes Amelia to go visit Derek, eventually buying a plane ticket for her to go to Seattle. Pete and Cooper go head to head when Pete's patient starts giving her autistic child her medically prescribed pot. Cooper and Violet decide that they should see less of each other so that their significant others don't feel left out anymore.
57	3	"Playing God"	Donna Deitch	Sheila Lawrence	October 7, 2010	7.90
Trouble stirs in the practice when the man who hit Maya and Dell shows up, only for them to find out that he has a heart condition. While Violet and Pete are having dinner with an old friend of Pete's, they discover that he has been operating on patients in his home. Pete tries to help him out, and this worries Violet. Addison worries about her friendship with Naomi, while Sam flashes back to a pedophile case in which he was involved during his internship. Naomi hires Amelia to work in the practice, and Sheldon suggests ways for Naomi to work through her anger towards Sam and Addison. Cooper finds out that Charlotte has been looking for a house and when he asks why, she explains that it reminds her of everything bad that ever happened in their relationship. Pete turns in his friend when someone almost dies on the table, and he and Violet work on him working at the ER. Sam's revelation about the internship case he refused to discuss in detail for years exposes the core of his failed marriage to Naomi.
58	4	"A Better Place to Be"	Tom Verica	Barbie Kligman	October 14, 2010	8.07
Everyone at the practice is brought to a halt when Betsey's aunt, who has been taking care of her since Dell's death, shows up and leaves Betsey in Violet's care. Violet takes Betsy in for the night, and is happy to find that Betsey and Lucas bond pretty well. Addison and Pete have a patient who is in constant pain and is also pregnant. In their quest to pinpoint a diagnosis, Amelia finds the patient's brain is too big for her head. Amelia can fix the pain without killing the baby. Cooper and Sheldon deal with a patient, Keith, who has been bullied at school, and is eventually driven to attempt suicide when his mother says she gave birth to a 'wimp' of a son. Cooper and Pete explain to Violet that she isn't ready to take in another child when she starts bringing up the idea of adopting Betsey. When she suggests the idea of someone in the office adopting her, they all turn her down, and they are forced to turn Betsey into CPS. This leaves Violet telling everyone that they did a horrible thing.
59	5	"In or Out"	Ed Ornelas	Ayanna A. Floyd	October 21, 2010	7.66
Violet and Sheldon go to a prison to evaluate some prisoners' ability to cope with life on the outside. Addison and Sam deal with a newborn baby who has a tumour wrapped around her heart. When Addison is all ready for the surgery, the oncologist on the case convinces the parents to choose chemotherapy. Amelia starts looking to Sheldon for sex, when Violet and Charlotte talk about the size of his penis and how great the sex is with him. Addison and Charlotte go head to head on the procedure both doctors want. Cooper talks to Charlotte about having children. Violet tries to see why the inmate she got out isn't talking to her. After the mother that just gave birth to the baby falls unconscious, her husband makes the decision of going with chemotherapy. When she regains consciousness, Addison and Sam proceed to operate and are able to remove the tumour. Sheldon confesses that he wants a grown woman, not Amelia; Charlotte explains she doesn't want kids.
60	6	"All in the Family"	Ann Kindberg	Sanford Golden & Karen Wyscarver	October 28, 2010	7.68
Charlotte and Pete have to deal with Pete's patient having HIV and having a gay lover, while he leads a double life with Charlotte's patient who is ready to have a baby after having years of reconstructive surgery. Addison, Sheldon, Amelia, and Sam all deal with a comatose woman who has ended up pregnant by her husband: Addison believes he should put away for molestation, but the rest of them believe that he needs extensive therapy. Violet tries to find out about Pete's past by looking for his brother, eventually persuading him to tell her the story of why his mother is in jail. Charlotte continues to get enraged with Cooper talking about babies. An unstable man who has been behaving erratically in the ER attacks and assaults Charlotte as she is about to leave, and pushes her back into her office.
61	7	"Did You Hear What Happened to Charlotte King?"	Allison Liddi-Brown	Shonda Rhimes	November 4, 2010	10.18
After her brutal assault, Charlotte struggles alone to find aid to help her wounds, where a shocked Pete finds her. Pete takes her to the nearest treatment room, shunning the staff's curiosity and inquiries, and attempts to treat her injuries. She initially resists until he tells her of her broken wrist, hand and eye socket. Charlotte calls Addison for help. Violet comes to the club that Amelia, Cooper, and Sam are at and informs them that Charlotte was violently attacked at the hospital. After arriving, Addison finds that Charlotte has been raped during the attack. When she suggests a rape kit be taken, Charlotte says that the rape never happened, and refuses consent. Amelia and Charlotte bond over their mutual addictions; Addison gets mad at Sam because he wants to go home and not stay for support. Violet is reluctant to see Charlotte because of her own attack that she went through a year before. Sheldon assesses a man in police custody who has blood on his clothes, and won't tell the police who he attacked---unaware that the victim is Charlotte.
62	8	"What Happens Next"	Michael Zinberg	Jennifer Cecil	November 11, 2010	8.21
Charlotte returns to work after her assault, but when anyone tries to talk to her, she bristles and states she wishes to be left alone. Addison and Sheldon deal with a case of a wife who inexplicably beats her husband, and find out that her cancer has spread. Despite surgery to remove it they are ultimately unsuccessful. Cooper and Pete deal with a case of a young girl with cancer who needs chemotherapy again but her father wishes to try a shaman instead. Cooper goes to court to advocate for the child, and after revealing her own wishes and concerns, she receives the chemo and the shamanistic rituals. Addison tells Sam about Charlotte's rape, and Sam hints to Violet about it in hopes that she can help. When Sheldon reveals to Violet that the man he questioned in police custody admitted to raping someone, both he and Violet conclude that Charlotte was the likely victim. Violet confides to Charlotte about her own experience of rape back in college. Addison confesses she took a rape kit from Charlotte against her wishes and placed it in storage. She decides to report the kit to the police, to assist in finding the man responsible.
63	9	"Can't Find My Way Back Home"	Mark Tinker	Fred Einesman	November 18, 2010	8.01
Pete's brother, Adam, comes to Pete for help when he believes that the treatment his mother is getting in prison may result in her dying. When Charlotte and Cooper go to the precinct, the police say they think they found the suspect and they schedule a line-up. While at the line-up, Charlotte freezes when she sees her attacker and insists that the man isn't there, but Violet, who went with her, suspects that she is lying. Addison and Amelia work on a case of a mother who has disabling seizures from scar tissue in her brain from injuries sustained in an auto accident a few years back. Her capable but stressed fifteen-year-old daughter is bearing the weight of dealing with her mother's seizures and ongoing healthcare. Amelia attempts to convince her that an operation could stop the seizures permanently and prolong her mother's life. After the line-up, Violet tells Cooper about Charlotte's rape. When he gets home, Charlotte realizes that he knows, and together they go to another line-up where Charlotte confirms that Lee was the one who raped her. When Pete chooses not to assist in getting his mother out of prison, his brother leaves, stating that if he can't do this for their mother, he refuses to have anything to do with him.
64	10	"Just Lose It"	Stephen Cragg	Elizabeth Klaviter	December 2, 2010	7.90
After the District Attorney's office tells Charlotte and Cooper that they won't be prosecuting Lee, Charlotte begins talking in a new chipper way to show Cooper she's okay. Naomi comes back from her trip, and shows the practice all of the images and wonderful things she did with the Williams' Foundation. Amelia tries to befriend Cooper. Addison, Violet, and Pete work on a case of a woman who gives birth to a baby yearly, and then sells the baby to doctors for money. Sam wonders about the reasons for Addison's sudden desire for a baby. Cooper deals with a patient who has gained three hundred pounds in three years and finds that his mother had been abusing him and that he gained the weight in an attempt to repel her and protect himself. Cooper kisses Amelia, and confides to Sheldon that Charlotte isn't the same. Late at night Addison gets a call from Bizzy; at the airport Bizzy says she needs Addison's help and Susan is wheeled off the plane.
65	11	"If You Don't Know Me By Now"	Eric Stoltz	Zahir McGhee	January 6, 2011	7.67
Bizzy demands that Addison save Susan's life, at any cost. Violet tells Naomi that she has written a book that is going to be published. Amelia and Pete work on the case of a man who needs brain surgery, but his wife won't let him get it if it's going to harm his intelligence. Cooper and Charlotte attempt to have sex for the first time since Charlotte's attack. Naomi and Sheldon read Violet's book and both approve, but when Pete reads it he questions whether Violet is going to want everyone to know every little detail of their lives. Addison is distraught after her mother slaps her when she says that Susan is going to die; then decides to collaborate with Dr. Rodriguez in efforts to save Susan's life. After Charlotte thanks Violet for telling her about her rape, saying it helped her, Violet decides that she is going to go on a book tour. When Addison goes to tell her mother how she really feels, Bizzy confesses that she divorced the captain and is going to marry Susan.
66	12	"Heaven Can Wait"	Kenny Leon	Barbie Kligman	February 3, 2011	7.05
Addison begins planning Bizzy and Susan's wedding. Charlotte goes to therapy, but is shocked when the therapist gives her prescriptions instead of listening to her talk. When she tells Sheldon, he is confused because the therapist is his longtime friend and mentor, and goes to find out what has happened. At dinner his friend has a psychotic break and runs off. Sam begins to worry about an old patient when he notices that the caretaker has been taking credit cards out in his name. After seeing Addison flirting with Dr. Rodriguez, Naomi tells her that she is most likely going to mess things up with Sam as she always does when things are good. Charlotte and Cooper decide that they're both ready to have sex again after the attack. At the wedding reception, Addison finds out that Susan signed a DNR and isn't truly as well as she's been leading everyone to believe, and she eventually collapses while dancing with Bizzy.
67	13	"Blind Love"	Bethany Rooney	Craig Turk & Steve Blackman	February 10, 2011	7.26
After Susan collapses at the wedding, Addison rushes to save her life. Charlotte finds out that her attacker is in the hospital after being stabbed by his girlfriend, and has to decide if Sam should let him live or not. While talking to Susan, Addison finds that she is going to die and calls Bizzy. Susan flat-lines when Bizzy arrives, and Addison does not resuscitate her because of the DNR she signed, enraging Bizzy. After talking with Naomi, Charlotte realizes she shouldn't tell Sam to kill Lee, and instead convinces his girlfriend to tell the police about everything. Amelia and Pete deal with a blind mother who is fighting to keep her baby. After operating on her eyes, they find that she hasn't regained her eyesight and help bring the mother and grandmother together. Addison finds her mother dead in her hotel after committing suicide because of Susan's death.
68	14	"Home Again"	Mark Tinker	Krista Vernoff	February 17, 2011	6.73
After Bizzy's death, Addison heads to Connecticut to arrange her funeral. After coming back to the practice Sam and everyone else realize that they should all be with Addison for support and head to her side, except Sheldon and Violet. Sheldon and Violet deal with a couple, a man who is being executed for a wrongful crime, and the wife who has been trying for seventeen years to get him off death row. After meeting with the husband two days before his execution, the husband confesses to Sheldon that he indeed committed the crime and he and Violet must break the news to the wife. When finding out that Bizzy had already arranged her own funeral, Addison is surprised to find that she had arranged for her to give the eulogy. Cooper gives advice to Sam to help Addison. The day before the funeral, Addison confesses Bizzy took her own life, and not suffered a heart attack as she had previously stated.
69	15	"Two Steps Back"	Jeff Bleckner	Ayanna A. Floyd	February 24, 2011	6.44
After everyone reads Violet's new manuscript for the book, they all feel hurt about some of the things that were said about them. Cooper and Charlotte decide to go to couple's therapy where they argue about Charlotte wearing the engagement ring and Cooper confesses to kissing Amelia. Sheldon deals with a patient whose multiple personalities begin to show up after her sister gets married and moves to Texas. Sam and Naomi try to work things out for Olivia when Maya gets accepted to a school in New York. Charlotte confronts Amelia about the kiss, and eventually is shown that Cooper loves Charlotte, and she ultimately decides that the wedding is going to happen in the spring. Pete comes home with good news for Violet, stating that everyone thinks she should publish the book. Sam and Naomi kiss at the end of the night, after taking care of Olivia during the day.
70	16	"Love and Lies"	Ann Kindberg	Moira McMahon	March 17, 2011	5.97
Addison returns from Connecticut, and begins crying at everything that she sees because of the loss of her mother. Dr. Fife returns to pledge his love for Naomi and to bring her back to where he was. Amelia talks her friend into getting a genetics test to see if she has Huntington's disease, only to find out that her test is positive, and Amelia is forced to help her friend deal with the devastating news. Sheldon grows irritated with the women of the practice going to him with their problems. Violet has to decide what picture she wants to put on the back of the book, and decides to put one of her with her stomach exposed to show what happened during the attack. Naomi, Cooper, Charlotte, and Addison all argue whether they should help a couple that wants to take their unborn, but terminal child's ovaries and pump hormones into the eggs so that they'll be able to finally have a child of their own after failed IVF. Naomi questions whether or not she's happy being in LA and the practice. Addison finds out about Sam and Naomi's kiss.
71	17	"A Step Too Far"	Scott Printz	Fred Einesman	March 24, 2011	7.93
After reading a review of her book, Violet begins to question if she really is a horrible person. At the book signing party, Sheldon begins to fall for the same writer that bashed Violet and her book. Addison and Pete work on a pregnant woman who is having a baby for her sister and husband, but not everything is as black and white as it seems. When they find out that the sister and husband have fallen in love. Amelia begins to believe that Addison might be pregnant. Sam and Cooper deal with a teenager who has had previous heart problems, and plans to go to a wrestling tournament even when they advise him not to because it could be fatal. Charlotte tries to show Cooper that just because he hasn't published anything, or broken any records that he isn't a bad doctor. Pete and Addison try to stop the sister from taking the baby when they have to perform a hysterectomy. After taking a "at home" pregnancy test, Addison finds out that she isn't pregnant, and question Sam if he'll ever be ready to have a child with her.
72	18	"The Hardest Part"	Paul Adelstein	Jennifer Cecil	March 31, 2011	7.35
Pete's work is turned upside down when Adam brings their mother to St. Ambrose. After examining his mother, Pete finds out that Adam got their mother out of jail by poisoning her. Violet and Sheldon work on the case of a teen pregnancy pact, but things get complicated when the mother of one of the teens bought Violet's book and refuses to let her daughter be treated by Violet anymore. Cooper and Amelia fight over what procedure a piano protegé should receive, one that could save his life but leave him unable to play the piano ever again. Violet finds out that Sheldon has been dating Marla Tompkins, the reviewer that bashed her. Marla gets angry at Sheldon when she believes that he is putting Violet ahead of her. Charlotte is shocked to find out that Cooper had played the piano, and gets him to show that he shouldn't ever give up his dreams. Pete decides to forgive his mother for all of the horrible things that happened. His mother dies after the poisoning ruined her heart.
73	19	"What We Have Here..."	Karen Gaviola	Christopher Fife	April 28, 2011	6.68
Cooper gets jealous when he finds that Charlotte has kept a picture of her ex-husband. Violet finds that she's being sued by Katie because of all the information that she put in her book. Addison and Sam butt heads when it comes to a patient who faces the decision of giving birth to her baby at twenty-five weeks or letting her cancer spread. Violet decides to go see Katie and ask why she is suing her, which enrages Pete. Cooper goes to find Billy, Charlotte's ex-husband, so he can see if there are any old feelings left. When Billy talks to Charlotte, he confesses that he's gay, and that he never meant to hurt her. Sam and Addison contemplate whether or not to break up, because of their differences over having a baby. Violet finds out that Katie dropped the lawsuit, but now the medical board is reviewing her license and she could lose everything.
74	20	"Something Old, Something New"	Mark Tinker	Sanford Golden & Karen Wyscarver	May 5, 2011	6.89
Tensions rise between Charlotte and Cooper when both their parents come for the wedding. Pete and Addison are questioned in Violet's case. Sam and Addison decide that they aren't going to tell anyone that they have broken up, only for Addison to tell Naomi. Naomi and Dr. Fife work on a woman that Naomi has known, and who has suddenly become depressed; Charlotte finds that Cooper's parents don't like her. Amelia is asked to be Charlotte's maid of honor at the wedding. At the reception, Cooper and Charlotte's parents tell them that they don't believe they should be getting married. The day of the wedding, Cooper and Charlotte decide to go to Vegas instead of dealing with their families. Amelia accidentally takes a sip of champagne instead of ginger ale. The medical board goes after the practice when they decide the way the doctors' work is unethical.
75	21	"God Bless the Child"	Jeannot Szwarc	Jennifer Cecil & Barbie Kligman	May 12, 2011	7.27
Addison meets a patient who believed that she had an abortion, but it really failed and she is now faced with the decision of aborting a baby at nineteen weeks. All of the doctors become worried when Betsey ends up in the hospital after a fall. Cooper and Violet believe that Betsy is being abused and set out to find out if she really is. Naomi talks to Addison's patient and tries to convince her to not have an abortion. The medical board continues to review Violet's case. Amelia goes to Charlotte when she starts craving alcohol again. Addison performs the abortion on her patient in spite of having mixed feelings about it. Sheldon becomes convinced that Betsey's foster brother is the one who is abusing her, not the parents. With Betsey in a coma after her brain surgery, the foster parents remand custody of Betsey back to social services, saying that their son has to come first. Amelia goes to a bar and relapses into her addiction. After telling Fife her decision about moving back east, Naomi decides to adopt Betsey.
76	22	"...To Change the Things I Can"	Mark Tinker	Craig Turk & Steve Blackman	May 19, 2011	7.45
Addison decides to take her life in a new direction and try things that she has never done, so she begins talking to a man that she met in the supermarket--eventually accepting a date with him. Violet's medical license gets suspended, and she finds out that the medical board is going after the practice next. Charlotte finds that her new patient is a rape victim and tries to convince her that she is going to come through the rape. Cooper and Pete work with a little girl who is going to die soon, but by trying to give the little girl more time with her family she inadvertently dies because of a reaction to the drugs. Violet decides to go on a book tour which angers Pete. Naomi decides that she wants to be with Dr. Fife and moves to New York with Betsy and him so they can be close to Maya. Charlotte worries about Amelia when she finds that she has begun drinking again. After accepting the offer to go to Fiji with the supermarket man, Addison turns back and tries to save the practice. While cleaning up the house after Violet leaves, Pete suffers a heart attack.

== Ratings ==
#	Episode	Air Date	Rating	Share	18-49 (Rating/Share)	Viewers (m)
1	"Take Two"	September 23, 2010	6.2	10	3.2/9	9.02
2	"Short Cuts"	September 30, 2010	5.5	10	2.8/8	7.93
3	"Playing God"	October 7, 2010	5.3	9	2.9/8	7.90
4	"A Better Place to Be"	October 14, 2010	5.5	10	3.0/9	8.07
5	"In or Out"	October 21, 2010	5.1	9	2.7/8	7.66
6	"All in the Family"	October 28, 2010	5.4	8	2.7/8	7.68
7	"Did You Hear What Happened to Charlotte King?"	November 4, 2010	7.0	12	3.9/11	10.18
8	"What Happens Next"	November 11, 2010	5.7	10	2.9/8	8.21
9	"Can't Find My Way Back Home"	November 18, 2010	5.5	10	2.9/9	8.01
10	"Just Lose It"	December 2, 2010	5.4	9	2.8/8	7.90
11	"If You Don't Know Me By Now"	January 6, 2011	TBA	TBA	2.7/8	8.17
12	"Heaven Can Wait"	February 3, 2011	4.8	8	2.5/7	7.05
13	"Blind Love"	February 10, 2011	5.0	9	2.6/7	7.26
14	"Home Again"	February 17, 2011	4.8	8	2.3/7	6.73
15	"Two Steps Back"	February 24, 2011	4.5	8	2.3/7	6.44
16	"Love and Lies"	March 17, 2011	4.1	7	1.9/6	5.97
17	"A Step Too Far"	March 24, 2011	5.4	9	2.6/7	7.93
18	"The Hardest Part"	March 31, 2011	5.0	8	2.7/7	7.35
19	"What We Have Here..."	April 28, 2011	4.5	7	2.2/6	6.68
20	"Something Old, Something New"	May 5, 2011	TBA	TBA	2.3/6	6.89
21	"God Bless the Child"	May 12, 2011	TBA	TBA	2.3/6	7.27
22	"...To Change the Things I Can"	May 19, 2011	TBA	TBA	2.5/7	7.45

== DVD release ==
Private Practice: The Complete Fourth Season
Set Details		Special Features
22 Episodes; 5-Disc Set; English (Dolby Digital 5.1 Surround); English SDH, Spanish & French subtitles; Runtime: 944 minutes		An Inside Look: The Violation of Charlotte King - KaDee Strickland discusses how she researched and prepared for shooting this episode plus her work with RAINN.; Deleted Scenes; Bloopers
Release Dates
Region 1	Region 2	Region 4
September 13, 2011	April 2, 2012	October 12, 2011
