= Private Practice season 6 =

Private Practice
- Season 6
- DVD cover art for the complete sixth and final season of Private Practice
- Starring: Kate Walsh; Benjamin Bratt; Paul Adelstein; KaDee Strickland; Brian Benben; Caterina Scorsone; Griffin Gluck; Taye Diggs; Amy Brenneman
- No. of episodes: 13

Release
- Original network: ABC
- Original release: September 25, 2012 – January 22, 2013

Season chronology
- ← Previous; Season 5

The sixth and final season of Private Practice premiered on September 25, 2012, with a limited run of thirteen episodes. Private Practice was renewed for a sixth season on May 11, 2012.

In an interview, Shonda Rhimes stated that this season will feature: "a death, some babies, a likely return of a favorite and there could possibly be a wedding" with the rumored possibility of a musical episode and return of ex-cast member Audra McDonald.

On October 19, 2012, after months of speculation, series creator Shonda Rhimes announced that the sixth season would be the final season of the show. It was confirmed that production wrapped on December 7, 2012, and that the final episode had been taped.

== Development ==
Private Practice was renewed by ABC for a sixth season, that was to have a limited number of thirteen episodes, on May 11, 2012. In July 2012, it was announced that Private Practice would premiere on September 25, 2012. On October 19, 2012, after months of speculation, series creator Shonda Rhimes announced that the sixth season would be the final season of the show. In late December 2012, it was announced that the series finale of Private Practice would air on January 22, 2013, and would feature Addison's wedding to Jake Reilly. After the finale, Shonda Rhimes spoke out stating, "The entire SEASON was a finale. Each episode (dedicated to each character) worked to wrap up their series-long arcs", and "Also, I had a very strong desire to NOT end the show. Not in the traditional where characters die or move away or shut down the practice", in response to fans stating that they didn't believe it was a true finale.

== Cast ==
=== Main cast ===
- Kate Walsh as Dr. Addison Montgomery
- Benjamin Bratt as Dr. Jake Reilly
- Paul Adelstein as Dr. Cooper Freedman
- KaDee Strickland as Dr. Charlotte King
- Brian Benben as Dr. Sheldon Wallace
- Caterina Scorsone as Dr. Amelia Shepherd
- Griffin Gluck as Mason Warner
- Taye Diggs as Dr. Sam Bennett
- Amy Brenneman as Dr. Violet Turner

=== Recurring cast ===
- Matt Long as Dr. James Peterson
- Justina Machado as Stephanie Kemp
- Carter MacIntyre as Nick Calhoun
- Charlie Hofheimer as Ron Nelson
- Chryssie Whitehead as Dana Nelson
- Diane Farr as Miranda
- Aloma Wright as Mildred Clemons
- Missy Yager as Megan Stewart
- Emily Rios as Angela Reilly
- Marianne Jean-Baptiste as Gabi Rivera
- Blue Deckert as Joe Price
- Kylie Rogers as Sarah Nelson
- Jack Bobo and Joey Bobo as Lucas Wilder
- Emily Moss Wilson as Judi

=== Guest stars ===
- Audra McDonald as Dr. Naomi Bennett
- Alex Rocco as Ed Diamanti
- Robert Pine as Jim Wallace
- Richard Roundtree as Raymond McCray
- L. Scott Caldwell as Jillian McCray
- Alfre Woodard as Dee Bennett
- Deanna Dunagan as Dr. Vivian Carlsmith
- Marisol Nichols as Lily Reilly
- Lee Garlington as Stella Peterson
- Faran Tahir as Charles

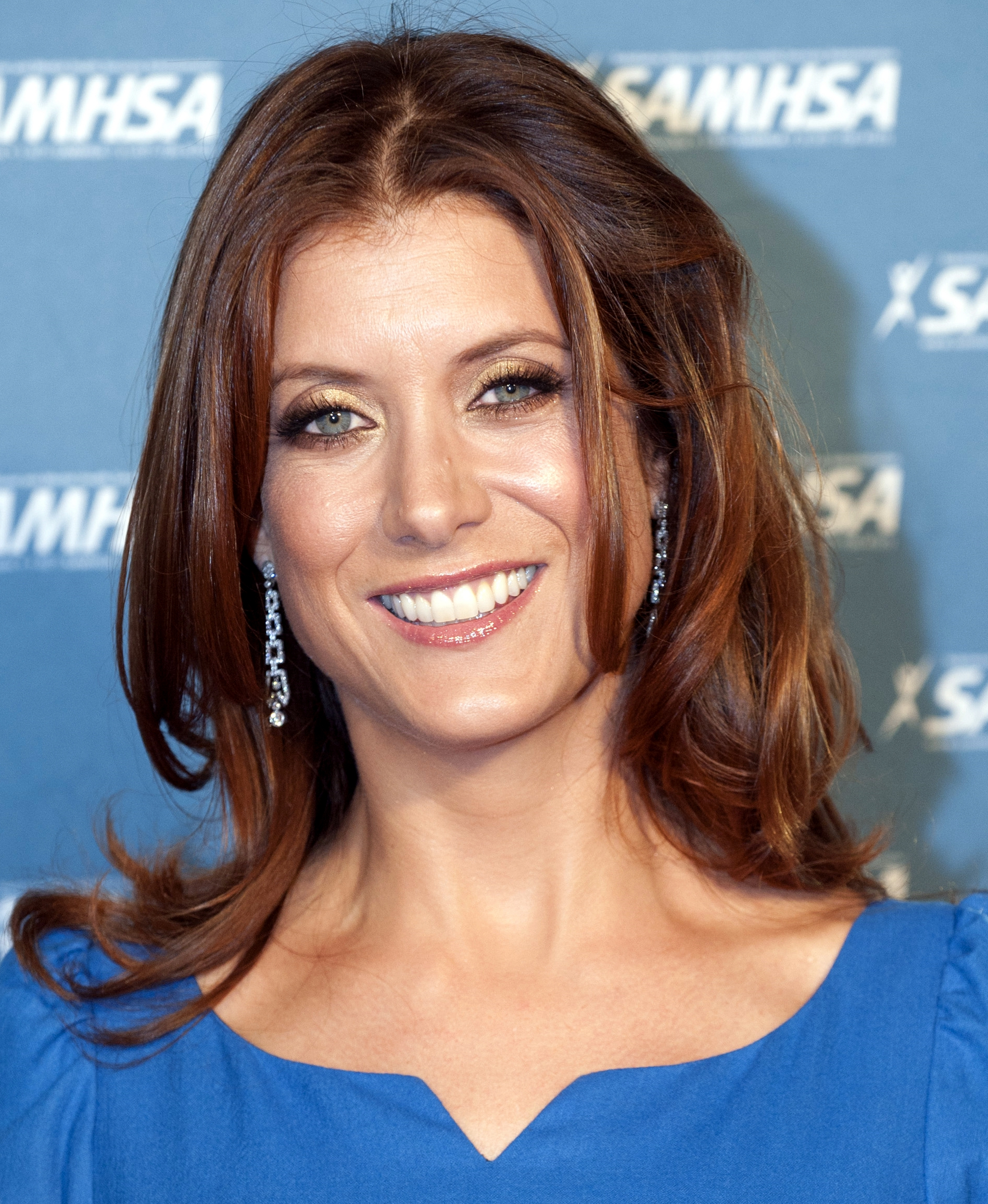
Kate Walsh portrayed Addison Montgomery for the entire series' run.

Following the renewal of Private Practice, it was announced that Tim Daly would not be returning to the show because of budgetary reasons, and his character would be killed off in the season premiere. In June 2012, Kate Walsh announced that she would be leaving Private Practice after this season, but suggested that the show could still go on without her. Cast mates Benjamin Bratt, Paul Adelstein, KaDee Strickland, Brian Benben, Caterina Scorsone, Griffin Gluck, Taye Diggs, and Amy Brenneman all returned as their characters for the sixth season. In September 2012, it was announced that actor Matt Long had been cast in a recurring role as James Peterson, the new ER attending, and a potential love interest for Amelia. In September 2012, it was announced that Alfre Woodard was cast as Sam's mother, Dee Bennett. After months of speculation it was announced that Audra McDonald was to return during the season finale, and reprise her role as Naomi Bennett. In November 2012, it was announced that Diane Farr was cast in a recurring role, for the last three episodes of the series, as Miranda, a love interest for Sheldon.

== Plots ==
In the sixth-season premiere, Violet finds out that Pete hasn't shown up for court and assumes that he ran off, only to find out later that he had a heart attack jogging and died. Charlotte finds outs that she's pregnant but is happy because her IUD will most likely destroy the pregnancy, only to find out she's pregnant with triplets. As Charlotte and Cooper deal with having triplets, Violet has to cope with Pete's death and trying to raise her son by herself. Sheldon deals with the fact that he has prostate cancer, and falls in love with a fellow cancer patient who is terminal. Addison tries to make her relationship with Jake work while running into snags trying to adopt Henry, and she eventually proposes to Jake. Amelia, still dealing with the trauma of delivering a child without a brain, finally decides to give love another try when she meets a handsome ER doctor. Naomi's return complicates things for herself and Sam.

== Reception ==
Private Practice's sixth season opened up to 6.45 million viewers with a 1.9/5 Nielsen rating/share in the 18–49 demographic. As of December 2012 "Aftershock" has served as the season's most viewed episode. "The Next Episode" so far is the seasons' and series' least watched episode, with 3.72 million viewers. In December 2012, TVGuide rated the final season of Private Practice with a B− grade, stating that Shonda Rhimes gave the series exactly what it needed when the series was beginning to feel 'stale'.

== Episode list ==
List of Private Practice season 6 episodes
| No. overall | No. in season | Title | Directed by | Written by | Original release date | US viewers (millions) |
|---|---|---|---|---|---|---|
| 99 | 1 | "Aftershock" | Mark Tinker | Barbie Kligman | September 25, 2012 | 6.45 |
Addison's choice is revealed to be Jake. Sam has started a new relationship with a nurse. Violet believes that Pete has skipped out on bail until she gets a phone call from Pete's phone, from a man, telling her that Pete had a fatal heart attack while he was on his run. When Charlotte finds out that she's pregnant, but still has her IUD in, she believes that she will miscarry, even asking Addison to "not be good at her job" to increase her chances of miscarriage, but when she comes back they find out that Charlotte is pregnant with triplets. Amelia has been sober a year, and is embracing happiness, while Sheldon is still seeing his ex-wife and is happy with her, until he gets unsettling news from Sam after his yearly physical.
| 100 | 2 | "Mourning Sickness" | Ed Ornelas | Jennifer Cecil | October 2, 2012 | 6.01 |
After reading Pete's will, it is revealed that he wants all of his friends to have a party in his honor, so the doctors gather at Addison's home to reminisce. Sheldon works with a patient that wants to commit suicide because he keeps dreaming about molesting a little girl. After hearing many stories about how amazing Pete was, Violet takes the marijuana that Sam and she found in Pete's jacket, and goes into the bathroom and gets high with Cooper. After Violet asks Cooper to take care of Lucas if anything happened to her, Charlotte gets mad, but eventually agrees. Near the end of the party, Addison gets a call from Derek telling her that Mark was taken off life support, after which she tells Amelia, and confesses she wants Amelia to take care of Henry if she were to die.
| 101 | 3 | "Good Grief" | Bethany Rooney | Gabe Fonseca | October 9, 2012 | 6.00 |
Addison continues to grieve over Mark, and doesn't know if she should talk to Jake about it, but eventually decides to tell him everything about her past. This prompts Sam to tell everything to his new girlfriend so that he can start off everything new. Violet goes to grief counseling explaining that how her heart is broken that her son, Lucas, finally knows that Pete isn't coming back home. Charlotte decides to hire a new ER doctor, so that she can stop working all of the double shifts and spend more time with Cooper and Mason. Sheldon still doesn't want to talk to Sam, since he ran the test to find out if he has prostate cancer without Sheldon's permission. Amelia tries to help Violet by getting people to talk to her, which they take too literally.
| 102 | 4 | "You Don't Know What You've Got Till It's Gone" | Ann Kindberg | Fred Einesman | October 23, 2012 | 4.58 |
Charlotte hires a new ER attending, Dr. James Peterson to replace Pete, promising him a quiet ER only to have a rainy night in LA. All of the doctors deal with their patients. Addison has to deal with a pregnant woman having her fourth child, and her husband who seems to always have the same symptoms as her only to find out the husband has an infection in his spinal cord, so Amelia and the new ER doctor race to save the man's life. Sheldon continues to try and treat his suicidal patient. Cooper and Violet deal with a little girl who has broken her arm, and whose parents keep on fighting nearby. Things take a turn for the worse when the little girl goes missing, and Sheldon suspects his patient. Sam's relationship comes to an end when Addison accidentally reveals to his girlfriend that they used to date, and that they live next door to each other, things she assumed she'd already known. Charlotte is shocked that Dr. Peterson found out that she's pregnant.
| 103 | 5 | "The Next Episode" | Jeannot Szwarc | Zahir McGhee | November 13, 2012 | 3.72 |
After Sam is asked to have his life filmed as a reality show pilot, he is followed around for days to see what his life is really about. Sam's mom comes into town, and sees Addison in an awkward encounter, as Addison knows everything, with her boss and his wife, when he needs heart surgery. After giving him the bad news, Sam finds out that his mother and her boss have been having an affair for forty years. Violet, Cooper, and James continue to search for the little girl that went missing from the ER days before. At a party that Sam threw to get everyone together, an idea the reality show producers came up with, his mother's boss collapses on the floor. When they rush him into surgery Sam discovers that he needs to get a new lung, only for the boss's wife to tell Sam that he is his father. When Sam says he'll donate a part of his lung to his father, his father says that he's ready to go home.
| 104 | 6 | "Apron Strings" | Amyn Kaderali | Elizabeth J. B. Klaviter | November 20, 2012 | 4.24 |
Addison gets worried when Henry's biological mother comes back and starts wanting to see Henry more and more. James has a patient in the ER that is Addison's friend and mentor. After visiting her friend Addison happens upon an old patient, whose daughter is challenged, and is screamed at. Later on at the office Addison gets served papers informing her she is being sued. Cooper deals with not knowing who his parents are, and explaining it to Mason. After Addison's mentor finds out that she is dying, she gets her affairs together, only for Addison to find out that the mentor had a daughter, and promises to hand deliver a letter to her. In a meeting to discuss the woman suing her, Addison agrees to give her any amount of money. When Addison returns to visit her mentor, she finds that she has died, and goes to find her daughter to explain everything that had happened. At home Addison proposes to Jake.
| 105 | 7 | "The World According to Jake" | Allison Liddi Brown | Christopher Fife | November 21, 2012 | 3.76 |
After Jake doesn't say anything in response to Addison's proposal, she makes him promise to never say anything about it again. James continues to ask Amelia out. Jake finds out that Angela's new boyfriend is one of her college professors. Jake prepares to meet with the social worker so that she can approve of him so Addison can fully adopt Henry. He gets worried when she needs his finger prints, because he had gotten into a fight years ago. Violet continues to help the parents of the missing girl in therapy. Jake's patient Megan continues to try to get pregnant after losing the last baby. Jake begins talking to his dead wife, and gets into a fight with Addison after she insists that Megan needs to stop being so worried. Jake tries to convince Amelia to go out with James, saying that she deserves to be happy. At dinner with Angela, Jake threatens her boyfriend, trying to make them end the relationship. After having Angela barge into the house during the meeting with Mildred, Addison is convinced it's fine. Jake tells Addison that if she still wants to spend the rest of her life with him, then she should ask him again. She does and is presented with an engagement ring.
| 106 | 8 | "Life Support" | Mark Tinker | Jennifer Cecil & Barbie Kligman | December 4, 2012 | 4.42 |
Cooper breaks the fourth-wall, in this episode when he address the audience about Charlotte's pregnancy. Cooper brings Charlotte her breakfast, only for her to wake up and have her water break. In a series of flashbacks, Charlotte gets angry when she finds that Cooper didn't keep her pregnancy a secret. Addison tries to talk to Charlotte about her options, but Charlotte is shocked when Cooper begins suggesting terminating one of the babies' lives. Violet makes a new friend from her grief group. Charlotte and Cooper get kicked out of Lamaze class for making fun of all of the people in the class. Cooper and Charlotte argue over what religion to raise the children, and they learn that all the triplets are girls. Amelia talks Charlotte into letting her throw her a baby shower for the babies. At the hospital Addison is forced to deliver one of the triplets at 26 weeks, horrifying Charlotte and Cooper. Addison has to sew Charlotte's cervix shut, so she doesn't deliver any of the babies early. Cooper tells Charlotte that the baby lived, and she breaks down crying, as she can't see the baby as she's put in the trendelenburg position so the other babies aren't delivered early.
| 107 | 9 | "I'm Fine" | Scott Printz | Gabe Llanas | December 11, 2012 | 3.87 |
After Sheldon tells his ex-wife about his cancer and she decides to leave him, he begins going to chemotherapy and therapy to help him through the rough time. While he's going to chemo and therapy the search for the missing little girl continues. Sheldon believes that his patient has taken her and fights to get him to confess. He begins bonding with another patient who has breast cancer, Miranda. She doesn't come to chemo one day, convincings Sheldon that she had died. In therapy, his therapist wonders if Sheldon is just convinced that his patient took the little girl, because he wrongfully accused him. Amelia finds out about Addison's engagement. In therapy Violet tries to get the little girl's parents to continue to pray. After a final therapy session with his patient, Sheldon places him under a 5150 psychiatric hold and goes to his house to find Sarah. After raiding almost the entire house, they're convinced they're wrong, until they find her in the basement, hiding under a bed. Miranda comes back to chemo stating it was car trouble, and Sheldon declares that he wants to be with her, even if her cancer is terminal.
| 108 | 10 | "Georgia on My Mind" | Karen Gaviola | Jennifer Cecil & Barbie Kligman | December 18, 2012 | 3.84 |
After Charlotte is put on bed rest, she hopes to go two days without having any contractions so that she can get out of the Trendelenburg position. Cooper continues to stay in the NICU to make sure that no one misses anything with the newborn baby girl. Charlotte and Cooper can't agree over what to name the new baby. Charlotte gets Stephanie to be her nurse as she finds that all the other nurses aren't up to her standards. All of the doctors try to visit with Charlotte at different times so she doesn't go crazy. Charlotte finds out that Mason has begun acting out at school by starting a fight with another child. As Christmas season begins, Mason and Cooper go find a tree for the home. Mason insists that the tree should be put in Charlotte's room. Charlotte tries to reunite Sam and Stephanie after finding out why they broke up, eventually succeeding. After Cooper and Mason decorate the tree, Charlotte's water breaks. The other two babies have been in the womb for a little over 34 weeks. When they go to deliver the babies, Charlotte makes them stop so she can see her daughter in the NICU. She names her Georgia, and she and the doctors go off to deliver the other two babies.
| 109 | 11 | "Good Fries Are Hard to Come By" | James Larkin | Elizabeth J. B. Klaviter & Zahir McGhee | January 8, 2013 | 4.01 |
After listening to her television, and some advice from Jake, Amelia decides to finally go on a date with James, after several failed dates that Addison and Violet had set her up. After two dates, Amelia begins to believe that James isn't into her. After she accepts a date with someone else, James comes and kisses her, making her realize he is interested. James and Amelia work on a patient together who has a seizure out of nowhere. As their relationship continues to blossom Amelia goes to Charlotte for condom advice, but just as they're about to have sex, Amelia thinks about Ryan. The next day Amelia sees that James never left, and they start a relationship. Later on, Amelia meets James' parents and is offended when she thinks James was trying to shut her up. After she goes to visit Charlotte she sees that she was being stupid and goes to fix things with James. When their patient is admitted into the hospital for another seizure they realize that her problem isn't with brain but her heart. They both profess their love for each other.
| 110 | 12 | "Full Release" | Ann Kindberg | Eric Haywood | January 15, 2013 | 4.10 |
As Charlotte goes into labor with the other two babies everyone begins to suggesting baby names until Charlotte states that only Mason and Cooper are to help her. James asks Amelia if she wants to have another child. Cooper goes house hunting, and has to convince a house owner that he's a better candidate than another couple. Addison has her court hearing about Henry, and finds that she might not get to keep Henry because of Jake's past forcing her to pick between her baby and her fiance. Violet meets a man at the bookstore but can't get herself to flirt back with him as she starts reminiscing with Pete. She agrees to be friends with this man. Charlotte goes into labor, and delivers the first baby without problems, but the second baby is turned to the side, so Addison is forced to rotate the baby inside Charlotte's uterus. Sheldon tells Sam about his treatments for prostate cancer and how he and Miranda really met. Amelia tells James that does want another baby. Charlotte decides to name the baby girls Georgia, Caroline and Rachel. Jake approaches the judge when he finds out Addison might not get to keep Henry, and explains why he beat a man up. He then comes home and asks Addison when she wants to get married, because they have Henry.
| 111 | 13 | "In Which We Say Goodbye" | Mark Tinker | Shonda Rhimes | January 22, 2013 | 5.32 |
Addison and Jake get married. Sam and Naomi sleep together at the wedding. Three months later, Cooper tries to deal with life as being a stay-at-home father, but after not having any sleep he convinces Charlotte to hire a nanny. Violet tells her patient that she does not need therapy anymore, after she gets accepted to the greatest culinary school in the world. Naomi returns pregnant with Sam's baby. Addison tries to convince Naomi to tell Sam about the baby, but Naomi does not want to when she finds Sam does not want a child. Addison tells Sam that Naomi still loves him, and he travels to New York to win her back. Amelia and James continue their relationship. Charlotte goes back to work after her maternity leave. Addison has to adjust to married life. She records a video for Sam and Naomi's wedding day. Having left the practice to deal with Miranda dying, Sheldon tells her that he wants to be with her every step of way; we see them one final time enjoying drinks together on the beach. Jake realizes that he can't change Angie's life and promises that he won't butt into her love life anymore. Violet decides to write her book, naming it 'Private Practice'. Some of her colleagues disapprove while others support her, as the camera pans out of the kitchen and the elevators close for one last time.

== Webisodes ==
| No. in series | Title | Featured Cast | Original air date |
|---|---|---|---|
| 1 | "Episode 1" | KaDee Strickland & Kate Walsh | January 15, 2013 |
| 2 | "Episode 2" | KaDee Strickland & Griffin Gluck | January 16, 2013 |
| 3 | "Episode 3" | KaDee Strickland, Barbie Kligman & Kate Walsh | January 17, 2013 |

== Ratings ==
=== Live ratings ===
| No. in Series | No. in Season | Episode | Air Date | Timeslot (EST) | Rating/Share (18–49) | Viewers (m) |
|---|---|---|---|---|---|---|
| 99 | 1 | "Aftershock" | September 25, 2012 | Tuesdays; 10:00 p.m. | 1.9/5 | 6.45 |
| 100 | 2 | "Mourning Sickness" | October 2, 2012 | Tuesdays; 10:00 p.m. | 1.6/4 | 6.01 |
| 101 | 3 | "Good Grief" | October 9, 2012 | Tuesdays; 10:00 p.m. | 1.6/4 | 6.00 |
| 102 | 4 | "You Don't Know What You've Got Till It's Gone" | October 23, 2012 | Tuesdays; 10:00 p.m. | 1.4/4 | 4.58 |
| 103 | 5 | "The Next Episode" | November 13, 2012 | Tuesdays; 10:00 p.m. | 1.1/3 | 3.72 |
| 104 | 6 | "Apron Strings" | November 20, 2012 | Tuesdays; 10:00 p.m. | 1.3/4 | 4.24 |
| 105 | 7 | "The World According to Jake" | November 21, 2012 | Tuesdays; 10:00 p.m. | 1.0/3 | 3.76 |
| 106 | 8 | "Life Support" | December 4, 2012 | Tuesdays; 10:00 p.m. | 1.2/3 | 4.42 |
| 107 | 9 | "I'm Fine" | December 11, 2012 | Tuesdays; 10:00 p.m. | 1.2/4 | 3.87 |
| 108 | 10 | "Georgia on My Mind" | December 18, 2012 | Tuesdays; 10:00 p.m. | 1.2/3 | 3.84 |
| 109 | 11 | "Good Fries Are Hard to Come By" | January 8, 2013 | Tuesdays; 10:00 p.m. | 1.1/3 | 4.01 |
| 110 | 12 | "Full Release" | January 15, 2013 | Tuesdays; 10:00 p.m. | 1.2/3 | 4.10 |
| 111 | 13 | "In Which We Say Goodbye" | January 22, 2013 | Tuesdays; 10:00 p.m. | 1.5/4 | 5.32 |

=== Live +7 Day (DVR) ratings ===
| No. in Series | No. in Season | Episode | Air Date | Timeslot (EST) | 18–49 rating increase | Viewers (millions) increase | Total 18–49 | Total viewers (millions) | Ref |
|---|---|---|---|---|---|---|---|---|---|
| 99 | 1 | "Aftershock" | September 25, 2012 | Tuesdays; 10:00 P.M. | 1.2 | 2.55 | 3.1 | 9.01 | |
| 100 | 2 | "Mourning Sickness" | October 2, 2012 | Tuesdays; 10:00 P.M. | 1.0 | 2.22 | 2.6 | 8.23 | |
| 101 | 3 | "Good Grief" | October 9, 2012 | Tuesdays; 10:00 P.M. | 1.2 | 2.53 | 2.8 | 8.54 | |
| 102 | 4 | "You Don't Know What You've Got Till It's Gone" | October 23, 2012 | Tuesdays; 10:00 P.M. | 1.2 | 2.50 | 2.6 | 7.08 | |
| 103 | 5 | "The Next Episode" | November 13, 2012 | Tuesdays; 10:00 P.M. | .9 | - | 2.0 | - | |
| 104 | 6 | "Apron Strings" | November 20, 2012 | Tuesdays; 10:00 P.M. | .9 | 2.16 | 2.2 | 6.39 | |
| 105 | 7 | "The World According to Jake" | November 21, 2012 | Tuesdays; 10:00 P.M. | - | - | - | - | |
| 106 | 8 | "Life Support" | December 4, 2012 | Tuesdays; 10:00 P.M. | 1.1 | 2.34 | 2.3 | 6.77 | |
| 107 | 9 | "I'm Fine" | December 11, 2012 | Tuesdays; 10:00 P.M. | 1.0 | 2.17 | 2.2 | 6.03 | |
| 108 | 10 | "Georgia on My Mind" | December 18, 2012 | Tuesdays; 10:00 P.M. | .9 | 2.07 | 2.1 | 5.91 | |
| 109 | 11 | "Good Fries Are Hard to Come By" | January 8, 2013 | Tuesdays; 10:00 P.M. | 1.1 | 2.47 | 2.2 | 6.48 | |
| 110 | 12 | "Full Release" | January 15, 2013 | Tuesdays; 10:00 P.M. | 1.1 | 2.48 | 2.3 | 6.58 | |
| 111 | 13 | "In Which We Say Goodbye" | January 22, 2013 | Tuesdays; 10:00 P.M. | 1.0 | 2.30 | 2.5 | 7.62 | |

== DVD release ==
Private Practice: The Complete Sixth and Final Season
| Set Details | | Special Features |
| 13 Episodes; 3-Disc Set; English (Dolby Digital 5.1 Surround) | | Deleted Scenes; Bloopers |
Release Dates
| Region 1 | Region 2 | Region 4 |
| May 7, 2013 | December 2, 2013 | November 5, 2013 |
