= Charlotte King =

Fictional character from the TV series Private Practice

- Private Practice character
- KaDee Strickland as Dr. Charlotte King
- First appearance: "In Which We Meet Addison, a Nice Girl From Somewhere Else" 1x01
- Last appearance: "In Which We Say Goodbye" 6x13
- Created by: Shonda Rhimes
- Portrayed by: KaDee Strickland

In-universe information
- Aliases: Charlie; Char; Cruella (by Violet)
- Title(s): Chief of Staff (St. Ambrose Hospital); Former Director (Pacific Wellcare Center); M.D.
- Occupation: Attending at St. Ambrose Hospital; Physician at Seaside Health & Wellness; Physician at Pacific Wellcare Center (former); Physician at Oceanside Wellness Group (former)
- Family: "Big Daddy" (father, deceased); Augusta King (mother); Duke King (brother); Landry King (brother)
- Spouses: Billy Douglas (divorced); Cooper Freedman
- Significant others: Archer Montgomery; Sheldon Wallace
- Children: Mason Warner (step-son via Cooper); Georgia King-Freedman; Caroline King-Freedman; Rachel King-Freedman (triplet daughters with Cooper)

Dr. Charlotte King is a fictional character from the ABC medical drama Private Practice, portrayed by KaDee Strickland. Initially, Charlotte is the Chief of Staff at the fictional St. Ambrose Hospital in Santa Monica. She tends to have an adversarial role in the show, and is responsible for opening Pacific Wellcare Center, a medical practice in direct competition with the series' main practice, the Oceanside Wellness Group. Charlotte is also the wife of pediatrician Cooper Freedman (Paul Adelstein).

== Storylines ==
Charlotte is from Monroeville, Alabama. She has two brothers, Duke and Landry, and was raised by her father "Big Daddy" and mother Augusta King. Charlotte has a strained relationship with her mother, whom she refers to as "a son of a bitch" and "a drug addict". She has trouble connecting with others and forming close relationships because signs of affection were discouraged in her family. Charlotte attended Johns Hopkins School of Medicine, and went on to become the youngest physician to hold the position of Chief of Staff at St. Ambrose Hospital in Santa Monica. Charlotte unintentionally meets Cooper Freedman, the Oceanside Wellness Group's pediatrician, using internet dating websites. When she realizes who she's been communicating with, she is initially horrified, but ultimately the two end up establishing a sexual relationship.

When Cooper realizes that Charlotte is running the opening of Pacific Wellcare Center, upstairs and a direct competitor of Oceanside Wellness Group, he breaks up with her. They come close to reconciling when Charlotte believes she may be pregnant. When her pregnancy test comes back negative, Charlotte is disappointed. Cooper provides emotional support for Charlotte when her father is dying from lung cancer. He travels to Alabama to be with her and helps her turn off her father's life support machine. The couple reunites, but Charlotte quickly becomes jealous of Cooper's relationship with his best friend Violet Turner (Amy Brenneman), particularly when he moves in with her to provide support during her pregnancy. In retaliation, Charlotte has sex with Archer Montgomery (Grant Show); however, Cooper forgives her, as he realizes Charlotte is self-sabotaging since she is afraid of commitment. Charlotte is fired from her position as director of Pacific Wellcare Center because the practice owner William White (James Morrison) believes her to be heartless. However, Charlotte is hired by Oceanside Wellness Group to practice sexology.

Following Violet's attack, Cooper blames himself, and he and Charlotte's relationship struggles because of it. However, the couple's relationship strengthens again and Cooper asks Charlotte to move in with him. When Charlotte attempts to renovate Cooper's bathroom, Cooper reveals that he is broke. Charlotte's integration into Oceanside Wellness Group as a sexologist initially threatens Cooper, but ultimately he is able to accept it. The couple's happiness is interrupted when Cooper find's out that Charlotte has been hiding that she was previously married, and the couple breaks up. Charlotte enters into a sexual relationship with Pacific Wellcare Center psychiatrist Sheldon Wallace (Brian Benben), and Sheldon falls in love with Charlotte. Cooper reveals that his parents had a son who died before he was born, and he always felt like he was a replacement; the revelation of Charlotte's previous marriage triggered the same concerns. Determined to get Charlotte back, Cooper tells her how important she is to him, and they go out to dinner and have sex. Sheldon attempts to establish a relationship with Charlotte, and asks her out on a date. However, Cooper proclaims his love to Charlotte and proposes, which she accepts.

Charlotte returns as Chief of Staff at St. Ambrose Hospital. One night at the hospital, Charlotte encounters a mentally unstable patient who appears to be extremely aggressive. This patient ends up breaking into her office and brutally raping and beating her. Left with a broken wrist and hand, a deep laceration on her left arm, a broken eye socket, and a broken nose, Pete finds Charlotte. Charlotte lies to Pete about what happened to her, telling him that she was mugged and not disclosing the rape. While Charlotte is being treated, Cooper is at a bar with Sam Bennett and Amelia Shepherd. Cooper drunkenly hits on Amelia, and Sam steps in to defuse the situation. Addison comes to Charlotte's aid, and realizes Charlotte was raped. During her pelvic examination, Charlotte refuses a rape kit and tells Addison not to tell anyone else about the rape. Cooper eventually makes it to the hospital and is shocked by the extent of Charlotte's injuries.

Charlotte and Cooper continue on their path to marriage, promising to be honest with each other. In the vein of this promise, Cooper confesses his flirtation with Amelia at the bar, and Charlotte confronts her. Ultimately, the two are able to maintain their friendship, and Charlotte asks Amelia to be her maid of honor. Cooper confronts Charlotte's ex-husband Billy, and it is revealed that Billy cheated on Charlotte to confirm he was gay. This admission shocks Charlotte. Charlotte and Cooper eventually elope in Las Vegas to avoid their family's feuding. Cooper finds out he has a son Mason, who Charlotte initially has a hard time accepting. When Mason's mother dies from cancer, Charlotte fully accepts Mason. Charlotte and Cooper find out they're pregnant with triplets. Charlotte is extremely hesitant of becoming a mother, especially when she realizes the triplets are all girls. Charlotte has a complicated pregnancy and delivery, but ultimately has three healthy daughters - Georgia, Caroline, and Rachel.

== Development ==
Charlotte is one of the few series regulars not to have appeared in the backdoor pilot episode "The Other Side of This Life". Strickland was added to the cast in July 2007, prior to the commencement of the first series. She did not have to audition for the role, but was cast after a meeting with series creator Shonda Rhimes. Strickland was drawn to Charlotte's hardworking nature and "strong moral code". She has stated that the role is challenging as she does not "necessarily agree with her way of handling people or what she stands for" and is "shocked at how her point of view just really takes over for her and that's kind of it." Strickland grew up in a medical environment as her mother is a registered nurse, something she has deemed useful for the role as it presents her with a "phenomenal resource for [...] research material".

Prior to the broadcast of the first season of Private Practice, Lynette Rice of Entertainment Weekly described Charlotte as the show's "Tough-as-nails hospital administrator who disapproves of Oceanside Wellness' New Age attitude toward medicine." Matt Mitovich of TV Guide stated that a season later, Charlotte seemed "less shrill", observing that: "She originally came across as a character simply designed to be the thorn in everyone else's side. But I think they've worked her in better this season." Strickland agreed with this assessment, commenting: "I think that's what Shonda and the writers always sought for her, without even telling me where it was going. I clearly never saw the Cooper thing coming. I knew from what I had learned of Shonda's writing for Grey's that I would eventually get some justification for why I'm a kick in the pants. It's wonderful to have layers get peeled off. She's a Southern girl, and us Southern folks tend to have a lot of Southern gothic strangeness behind us."

Part of Charlotte's evolving characterization in the second season revolved around her relationship with Cooper. The season placed greater focus on the characters' love lives and the subsequent pressure placed on their personal and professional relationships. Rhimes explained: "I look at this sort of like a family business. I wanted the stories to challenge the family and how they deal with one another." Korbi Ghosh of Zap2it opined that the relationship between Charlotte and Cooper was interesting as it "came out of left field", something which Strickland agreed with, stating: "it just goes to show that life is very unpredictable, I think. The truth is that people end up in the most unlikely situations. You can be around someone for years and not know you have chemistry with them. Charlotte and Cooper have been in this professional environment, never knowing that they have a similar proclivity, if you will. And where that’s leading is really just wonderful. I’m really thrilled." The season also saw Charlotte in more of a central role, as the show's main protagonist Addison Montgomery (Kate Walsh) spent more time working at St. Ambrose Hospital. Walsh assessed that: "All the doctors at Oceanside Wellness need Charlotte, and yet they resent needing her, because she's a pain in the ass to deal with." With regards to the development of Charlotte and Cooper's relationship in the show's third season, Strickland has said: "I think I'm perfectly well-placed with Cooper. Other characters are going to have more of a triangle than me and Violet." By the sixth season, executive producer Barbie Kligman said the pairing was "real" while Walsh said it was "one of the best relationships", citing the example of Kyle Chandler and Connie Britton in Friday Night Lights, and that it was rare to see that on television. Strickland described her character's relationship with Cooper as "honest" and "steadfast".

== Reception ==
Isabelle Carreau of TV Squad is critical of Charlotte's character. In October 2007, she noted that of 306 respondents to a TV Squad poll on viewers' favorite Private Practice character, only one had selected Charlotte. Following the episode "In Which Charlotte Goes Down the Rabbit Hole", she opined: "I'm not sure that this somewhat Charlotte-centric Private Practice episode will have viewers relate more with the character." She wrote that she was indifferent towards Charlotte, and saw her as more of a recurring than regular character, whose lack of screen time made her hard to relate to. When Charlotte slept with Cooper in "In Which Cooper Finds a Port In His Storm", Carreau opined: "I'm not sure I like the port Cooper found in his storm and I'm pretty sure I'm not alone thinking this [...] It's clear they are trying to make Charlotte more meaningful but for me, it's too little too late." She wrote that Charlotte was as poorly introduced as unpopular Lost characters Nikki and Paulo, and suggested that the relationship had the potential to ruin Cooper, who was in her opinion the show's best character. Carreau would have preferred for Cooper's online date to turn out to be Violet. She did find Charlotte's nickname of "CanYouHandleMe441" interesting, and noted that: "It sure shows a side of her that we didn't know existed." When Charlotte was fired from her position as Director of Pacific Wellcare, Carreau wrote: "Someone finally told Charlotte that she doesn't have a heart. Okay, she does have one but it must be made of stone or ice or something similar."

Andrea Reiher of Zap2it called the scene in "Nothing to Fear" which saw Charlotte dress in white lingerie and a veil after proposing to a hesitant Cooper "creepy". When Cooper declined Charlotte's request that he move in with her in favor of moving in with Violet, Reiher questioned: "Why did Cooper have to tell Charlotte? Why couldn't he have just said yes to her and told Violet things were off? If he really loves Charlotte, why wouldn't he do that?" Fellow Zap2it writer Kiley McMichael agreed: "Cooper is an idiot. Truly. He says he wants this real future with Charlotte, but doesn't act like it. Best friends or not, there's no need for him to move in with Violet now that she's pregnant. She's not debilitated." When Charlotte slept with Archer in retaliation, McMichael noted: "[her] tough as nails exterior is crumbling, which is sad, because that's what made her interesting. Now she's just flawed." Reiher was critical of Charlotte in the episode which followed, commenting that she took an opposing stance to Cooper at work: "Because she's a giant turd. Man, I dislike her." She further recapped: "Cooper tries to reconcile with Charlotte and she gets mad at him for loving her, even though she's a horrible, horrible woman. I side with Charlotte. She sucks, don't love her Cooper! Love Violet! Instead, he grabs her in a hug and she cries and they kiss and I vomit in my mouth a little. Sorry but... I hate Charlotte."

In another negative review, Alessandra Stanley of The New York Times wrote that the female characters in Private Practice "collectively offer one of the most depressing portrayals of the female condition since The Bell Jar." Mid-season two, Jon Caramancia for the Los Angeles Times opined: "That Charlotte has become the axis around which most of this show's intrigue revolves only highlights how thin the central characters have become and how many of the show's initial charms have been neutered. The vivid sexual confusion between Violet Turner (Amy Brenneman) and Cooper Freedman (Paul Adelstein) has been completely sacrificed so that Cooper could play out his ridiculous affair with Charlotte, whose character has resisted all attempts at softening—sea changes in hair, makeup and wardrobe be damned."
