= Sheldon Wallace =

Dr. Sheldon Wallace
- Private Practice character
- First appearance: "Crime and Punishment" 2x08
- Last appearance: "In Which We Say Goodbye" 6x13
- Created by: Shonda Rhimes
- Portrayed by: Brian Benben

In-universe information
- Nickname: Shelley
- Gender: Male
- Title: M.D.
- Occupation: Psychiatrist at Seaside Health & Wellness (former); Psychiatrist at Pacific Wellcare Center (former)
- Spouse: Laura Wallace (divorced)
- Significant other: Violet Turner; Charlotte King; Miranda (deceased)

Dr. Sheldon Wallace is a fictional character in the ABC drama Private Practice, a spin-off of Grey's Anatomy. He is portrayed by Brian Benben.

== History ==
Sheldon's father was a surgeon. He originally wanted to be a surgeon but switched to psychiatry during his intern year.

Dr. Sheldon Wallace is a board-certified psychiatrist with extensive training in general adult and adolescent psychotherapy as well as diagnostic evaluation. Dr. Wallace trained at Stanford Medical School but also spent time serving in the National Guard, where he honed his darts skills.

== Storylines ==
=== Season 2 ===
In season 2 of Private Practice, Sheldon is hired by Charlotte King as the psychiatrist for Pacific Wellcare where he meets and starts up a relationship with fellow psychiatrist Violet Turner. Sheldon initially had problems in his relationship with Violet in the bedroom because he feels inadequate, but he later works them out. When Violet gets pregnant, Sheldon tells her he loves her and proposes to her, despite not knowing who the father is. Violet doesn't answer straight away, and Pete instead tells Violet he should have fought for her and loves her, and she chooses Pete over Sheldon. Ultimately, Pete lets it slip that Violet has chosen him. Sheldon sadly but gracefully steps aside.

=== Season 3 ===
In Season 3 of Private Practice, Sheldon is among the group blaming himself for what has happened to Violet, and he and Pete get into a fight. Later, Sheldon requests a paternity to test on Violet's son, Lucas, and the tests reveal Pete to be the father and Sheldon once again gracefully backs away.

Throughout the season Sheldon struggles to find his place in the practice and ultimately pursues a relationship with Charlotte who is still in love with Cooper. The two grow even closer but Charlotte's heart is clearly with Cooper. In the season finale he professes his love for Charlotte and is heartbroken when she gets engaged to Cooper.

=== Season 4 ===
In Season 4 of Private Practice, Sheldon continues to be the resident "therapist" to all his friends and colleagues. Amelia Shepherd makes sexual advances on him based on what both Charlotte and Violet have to say about their past sexual experiences with him and they tell Amelia that Sheldon plays hard to get. Early in the season he inadvertently discovers the identity of the man who raped Charlotte; he had interviewed the man, Lee McHenry, the night she was attacked and he had her blood on him. He later confronts McHenry, telling him he knows that McHenry will rape again. He starts an affair with a writer who gave Violet's new book a bad review despite the warning from Cooper that the affair is going to jeopardise his friendship with Violet.

=== Season 5 ===
During this season Sheldon finds himself trying to help Pete after his heart attack and Violet after she is reinstated and allowed to practice medicine. The one person he can't help is Amelia, as he is firmly against her helping her friend commit physician-assisted suicide. After Amelia's friend kills herself, Amelia goes on a drug binge and begins using with her boyfriend, and later fiancé. During an intervention, Sheldon constantly tries to reason and talk with Amelia who tells him she will never love him. After Amelia checks into rehab, she and Sheldon talk and visit one another and seem to be on track for resuming their friendship.

=== Season 6 ===
Sheldon is treating a patient that has thoughts of the sexual nature toward little girls. One night, this man is at the hospital the same night a little girl goes missing. Sheldon immediately thinks it is this man and runs to the room he is in to find him still in there and apologizes right away but the patient does not want to see Sheldon anymore. That same night Sheldon runs into a woman at the vending machine. Her candy got stuck, he tries to hit it loose with no avail, so he puts in money to get it to go out for her.

Eventually this patient goes to see Sheldon again, saying he is getting better and has a lady friend named Alyssa. Sheldon thinks it's the little girl that went missing but has no proof. As the sessions go on, things seem to be going wrong with “Alyssa” and Sheldon goes to the cops saying he knows he's breaking protocol but he thinks his patient has the missing girl. The cops say they cannot go on a hunch. Sheldon has another session and confronts him. Then he has cops come to put him in a psychiatric hold saying he threatened to hurt himself. Sheldon then tells the cops that his patient confessed to having the little girl. The cops and Sheldon go to the house and the little girl is indeed in the basement alive.

While all that was going on, Sheldon finds out he has prostate cancer. He begins going to radiation every day. The woman from the vending machine, whose name is Miranda, is going to radiation right before him each day as well. They connect instantly but Miranda only wants to exchange pleasantries because she has terminal cancer. Eventually, their connection can't keep them apart and they fall for one another.

One day Miranda falls and is rushed to the hospital. She has a seizure. Her cancer is getting worse. She signs herself out of the hospital against medical advice. Sheldon is upset at her for this. She tells Sheldon to leave. She says please do this for me and go! He won't so she walks away. He goes to work, talks with Sam and Jake, admits he is madly in love and quits. Sheldon then goes to find Miranda. He tells her he will be with her until the last moment and that he loves her. He says he is not walking away and she asks what they will do with the rest of her life? He says anything since he quit his job. We then see them at an exotic location as they hold hands laying together on the beach.
