= Cooper Freedman =

- Private Practice & Grey's Anatomy character
- First appearance: Grey's Anatomy: "The Other Side of This Life (Part 1)" 3x22 Private Practice: "In Which We Meet Addison, a Nice Girl From Somewhere Else" 1x01
- Last appearance: Grey's Anatomy: "The Other Side of This Life (part 2)" 3x23 Private Practice: "In Which We Say Goodbye" 6x13
- Created by: Shonda Rhimes
- Portrayed by: Paul Adelstein

In-universe information
- Nickname: Coop
- Gender: Male
- Title: M.D.
- Occupation: Pediatrician at Seaside Health & Wellness; Pediatrician at Oceanside Wellness Group (former)
- Family: Mr. Freedman (father); Mrs. Freedman (mother); Andy Freedman (deceased brother)
- Spouse: Charlotte King
- Children: Mason Warner (with Erica); Georgia King-Freedman; Caroline King-Freedman; Rachel King-Freedman (with Charlotte)

Dr. Cooper Freedman is a fictional character on the Grey's Anatomy spin-off, Private Practice. He is portrayed by actor Paul Adelstein.

== Character history ==
Cooper Freedman (Coop) was the only child, adopted, raised in Akron, Ohio. He never looked for his biological parents because he feels his parents are great. As a teen, he worked on summer camps in Indiana, where he realized he liked children and decided to become a pediatrician. He always says he wants to be "normal" in regards to his relationship with Charlotte King.

== Work ==
Cooper works at the Oceanside Wellness Center as a pediatrician. He is best friends with his coworker, Violet Turner, who is a psychiatrist. They both suffer from relationship troubles; Cooper has problems meeting women because he says that he does not know how to socialize with people, so instead of dating face-to-face, Cooper prefers internet dating. These online relationships almost never work out and he is always left humiliated. For example, in the episode "The Other Side of This Life, Part 1", Cooper's car is stolen by a woman he met online.

Despite his personal problems, Cooper is quite successful at his job. He is a member of the American Academy of Pediatrics. It is clear that he genuinely cares about every one of his patients, as he is easily able to empathize with them and is willing to go the extra mile to help them. For example, in one episode, he noticed several symptoms of abuse in a girl with a broken arm whose mother is Sam's patient. Despite Sam's objections, Cooper reports his suspicions and later testifies in court to help the child. On one occasion, Cooper even confides in a patient named Michael about a love dilemma, that he is in love with a woman, but also couldn't tell her. Cooper and Michael make a pact to tell the objects of their affection how they feel.

== Personal life ==
In the beginning of season 1 it is suggested that Cooper is in love with Violet Turner, his best friend and a psychiatrist at Oceanside Wellness. Cooper is often ridiculing Violet for her continued infatuation with her ex-boyfriend Alan. When Violet is feeling sexually deprived she makes a pact to be friends with benefits with Cooper, but Cooper backs out at the last minute because he does not want to change their relationship.

In the episode "In Which Cooper Finds a Port in His Storm," he meets Dr. Charlotte King, chief of staff at the local hospital and someone he knows professionally, through an on-line dating site. She is completely embarrassed by this and walks away from the date, and attempts to avoid Cooper thereafter, but the end of the episode, she agrees to have a drink with Cooper, but instead, the two end up having sex and enter into a strictly sexual relationship in later episodes. The two begin to care for each other; however, the relationship breaks apart after Cooper finds out Charlotte has secretly been making and executing plans to rent out the fourth floor of the practice.

In the episode "Homeward Bound", he goes to Alabama to find her and see her dying father. He assists in pulling the plug and on the ride home she cries in his lap. In "Nothing to Fear", they reconcile and she asks him to marry her. He initially agrees but later says he wants to spend the rest with her but declines. In 2x14 Charlotte forgives him until he says he's moving in with Violet. In 2x15, he reveals that Violet is pregnant, he is not the father, but he wants to help. He tells her that he loves her but she leaves saying that his first child should be with her.

Later Charlotte sleeps with Archer to push Cooper away. When she tells him, however, he refuses to give up on the relationship and pledges his love. Moved, she apologizes, and he says that he forgives her. They start fresh and everything goes well until Violet is attacked by a former patient, Katie. Cooper blames himself for not being there to protect her.

In the episode "Right Here, Right Now", he tells Charlotte that he is broke, and she pays to buy out his share of the practice. In the following episode, Charlotte joins the practice with a specialty in Sexology which makes him uncomfortable. He also feels emasculated, which is a running theme for him in season 3. In 3x07 Charlotte reveals that she was married before which causes tension between them and he breaks up with her later.

In 3x16 he comes back from a two-week vacation. She yells at him for abandoning her, and he says that it was a mistake to sleep with her. Later he walks in on her and Sheldon having sex. In 3x19 he works with Charlotte in a sex education session for the elderly. Also, he tells her that he wants to keep a professional relationship with her. In 3x20 Violet returns, and he almost kisses Charlotte.

He tells Violet that his parents' had another son who died before him, and that he feels like he was a second choice for Charlotte. He tells Violet he's going to try to get Charlotte back. In 3x21 he testifies for Violet's custody for her and Pete's son Lucas. He admits to the judge that she should not get custody of Lucas. Violet slaps him. At the end, he tells Charlotte that he hasn't been himself and the people he loves are important and asks her out to dinner. In 3x22 they have sex in the beginning but he later brushes her off. At the end of the episode Violet forgives him and he admits to her that he loves Charlotte. So Violet tells him to go after Charlotte. So he does. In the season 3 finale 3x23 He proposes to Charlotte and later tells everyone in the waiting room that he's getting married.

At the end, he tells her that he should take back the proposal and do it the next day, because it was a crappy day to propose with the Dell dying and Maya almost dying. When she doubts his motives he tells her, "you are everything I never knew I wanted, I cannot live without you." She gives him back the ring and he asks, "I propose again tomorrow, what will you say?" and she says she's going to say yes. Charlotte and Cooper's relationship hits a bit of a rough patch after she is raped, however they overcome their issues and marry. In season 5, Cooper discovers that he has a son, Mason, and Cooper instantly bonds with his child and after a bit of a rocky start, Charlotte eventually bonds with him as well. In the first episode of season 6 he and Charlotte find out they're pregnant with triplets girls, who they named - Georgia (name given by Charlotte, born 1st), Caroline (name given by Mason, born 2nd) and Rachel King-Freedman (name given by Cooper, born 3rd).
