= Blue Deckert =

American actor

Blue Deckert is an American actor known for his roles in film and television. A native of Daisetta, Texas, Deckert has had supporting roles in Dallas, Walker, Texas Ranger, Friday Night Lights, The Event, and others.

== Filmography ==
=== Film ===
Year	Title	Role	Notes
1986	Uphill All the Way	Cowboy Gambler	
1986	Getting Even	Kurt	
1987	The Outing	Det. Adams	
1987	Nadine	Mountain	
1987	Under Cover	Prison Guard	
1988	Heartbreak Hotel	Jones	
1989	Black Snow	Coy Harker	
1989	Blind Fury	Cornfield Killer #2	
1991	Hard Promises	Ray	
1991	Rush	Medical Examiner	
1992	Leap of Faith	Jake	
1994	Bad Girls	Rich Citizen	
1995	The Stars Fell on Henrietta	Contractor	
1996	Michael	Joe	
1997	Fire Down Below	Chris Larsen	
1997	The Curse of Inferno	Sheriff Gibson	
1998	Home Fries	Sheriff	
2002	The Rookie	Dave Patterson	
2004	The Alamo	Colorado Smith	
2004	Envy	Cal	
2004	The Last Shot	Criminal #1	
2009	The Stepfather	Captain Mackie	

=== Television ===
Year	Title	Role	Notes
1983	Lone Star Bar & Grill	Dave	Unaired pilot
1983	Bill: On His Own	Stan	Television film
1984	The Sky's No Limit	Reporter	Television film
1984	He's Not Your Son	Coach Morris	Television film
1985	The Lady from Yesterday	Sam Horton	Television film
1986	Dallas: The Early Years	Bill / Ace Hendricks / Card Decker	Television film
1986–1988	Dallas	Bill / Ace Hendricks / Card Decker	8 episodes
1986	Dalton: Code of Vengeance II	Deputy Campbell	Television film
1986	The George McKenna Story		Television film
1986	Houston: The Legend of Texas	Thomas Jefferson Rusk	Television film
1987	CBS Summer Playhouse	Harvey	Episode: "Travelin' Man"
1989	Gideon Oliver	Jim, Deputy Sheriff	Episode: "Kennonite"
1989	Fire and Rain	Jim Rodman	Television film
1990	Challenger	Johnny Corlew	Television film
1990	A Killing in a Small Town	Andy Blassingame	Television film
1991	In Broad Daylight	Ray Dennis	Television film
1991	A Triumph of the Heart: The Ricky Bell Story	Vendor	Television film
1991	Without Warning: The James Brady Story	Delivery Man	Television film
1991	America's Most Wanted: America Fights Back	Donald Gary Fletcher	Episode: "Fletcher"
1992	Ned Blessing: The True Story of My Life	Townsman #1	Television film
1992	Trial: The Price of Passion	Sgt. Theil	Television film
1992	A Taste for Killing	Elray Phelps	Television film
1992–1993	Dangerous Curves	Jake Carruthers / Frank Morelli	3 episodes
1993–2000	Walker, Texas Ranger	Sheriff Clark / Tim Carson / Howard Markham	7 episodes
1994	Pointman	Blue	Television pilot
1994	Witness to the Execution	Lt. Mike Spalding	Television film
1994	North & South: Book 3, Heaven & Hell	Tackett	1 episode; miniseries
1994	Walker Texas Ranger 3: Deadly Reunion	Jackson Hale Mitchelson	Television film
1994	The Substitute Wife	Royal Spencer	Television film
1994	Shadows of Desire	Sheriff	Television film
1995	Tall, Dark and Deadly	Lou	Television film
1995	Texas Justice		Television film
1995	Deadly Family Secrets	Jake	Television film
1996	Dallas: J.R. Returns	Detective Markham	Television film
1997	True Women		Miniseries; uncredited
1998	The Con	Card Player	Television film
1998	Point Blank	Agent Ramsey	Television film
1999	Hard Time: The Premonition	Cop #2	Television film
1999	Hard Time: Hostage Hotel	Contractor	Television film
2000	King of the World	Gorgeous George	Television film
2000	JAG	Agent Matlovich	Episode: "Life or Death"
2000	Providence	Bus Driver	Episode: "Do the Right Thing"
2002	The Twilight Zone	Older Lineman	Episode: "The Lineman"
2002	Malcolm in the Middle	Earl	Episode: "Forbidden Girlfriend"
2003	Boston Public	Jim McNeal	Episode: "Chapter Seventy-Four"
2004	Cold Case	Sam Tarrance	Episode: " Lover's Lane"
2004	NCIS	Federal Marshal	Episode: "The Bone Yard"
2004	The West Wing	Congressman Borden	Episode: "Third-Day Story"
2006	Close to Home	Bailiff	Episode: "Sex, Toys, and Videotape"
2006	ER	Watch Commander	Episode: "Bloodline"
2006–2011	Friday Night Lights	Coach Mac McGill	Recurring role; 53 episodes
2007	Jane Doe: How to Fire Your Boss	City Councilman	Video
2009	Bound by a Secret	Alex Peterson	Television film
2010–2011	The Event	General Armbruster	11 episodes
2010–2012	Private Practice	Detective Joe Price	5 episodes
2013	Grey's Anatomy	Frank	Episode: "Perfect Storm"
2014	The Mentalist	Chief Muller	Episode: "Blue Bird"
