= Violet Turner =

- Private Practice & Grey's Anatomy character
- First appearance: Grey's Anatomy: "The Other Side of This Life (Part 1)" 3x22 Private Practice: "In Which We Meet Addison, a Nice Girl From Somewhere Else" 1x01
- Last appearance: Private Practice: "In Which We Say Goodbye" 6x13
- Created by: Shonda Rhimes
- Portrayed by: Amy Brenneman

In-universe information
- Nickname: Vi
- Gender: Female
- Title: B.A., M.D., A.C.P.
- Occupation: Psychiatrist; Author
- Spouse: Pete Wilder (deceased)
- Significant other: Allan; Sheldon Wallace; The Captain; Scott Becker
- Children: Lucas Turner-Wilder (son with Pete)

Dr. Violet Maryann Turner is a fictional character on the American television drama Private Practice, a spin-off from Grey's Anatomy. She is portrayed by Amy Brenneman.

== Storylines ==
=== Season One ===
Violet is a psychiatrist at the Oceanside Wellness Center. Though she tells her patients that "happiness can be attained with focus", she fails to find any happiness in her own life and she even questions the usefulness of her chosen profession. Six months previously, her boyfriend Allan had ended their romantic relationship, devastating her. The situation was made worse when she ran into Allan in a supermarket, only to discover that he married a younger woman only a few months after their break-up. This has shaken Violet badly and she continues to telephone Allan as she tries to deal with their dissolved relationship.

Violet is highly offended by women who lie about being raped. In a conversation with Dell Parker, she confirms that she was raped during her junior year of college and her best friend in college helped her get through it. In Episode 4.08 ("What Happens Next"), Violet also reveals this experience to Charlotte (after Charlotte's own rape).

Violet is best friends with her co-worker, Cooper Freedman, often getting him out of humiliating situations with women.

Violet also attended the University of Oregon, pursuing medicine at Harvard Medical School. She is a member of the American Psychiatric Association and the American College of Psychiatrists.

=== Season Two ===
More recently, Violet has had relationships with both her co-worker Peter Wilder and Sheldon, a psychiatrist working for "the enemy", the fourth floor. After choosing to stay with Sheldon, she discovers that she is pregnant but is unsure who the father is. At first, she keeps this information to herself, as she fears her abilities as a potential mother. In a moment of confidence, she tells one of her patients this and afterwards confides in Cooper. Cooper willingly moves in with her to help her get through it and encourages her to see Addison about the baby. During a conversation with Dell, she experiences some cramping and admits to him that she is pregnant. He performs an ultrasound to make sure there are no problems and after seeing the baby's heartbeat for the first time, Violet has a panic attack. Dell then convinces her to tell both Sheldon and Pete about the situation. Gathering them both in her office, she tells them they are not responsible for this and she says she knows that neither of them want children. Sheldon and Pete, both shocked, are instantly angry that she didn't tell them sooner and that she assumes they wouldn't want to be a part of the child's life, depending on who the father is. Pete then bluntly asks if this conversation means she's keeping the baby. Pausing, Violet admits that yes she will be raising the child, which up until that point was undecided. Later on, Sheldon proposes to Violet. In the Season 2 finale, Pete confronts Violet and says that he loves her and wants them to try as a family. She turns him down, but later kisses Pete and tells him she loves him too.

Also in the Season 2 finale cliffhanger, Violet is drugged and trapped in her home by Katie, a mentally ill former patient who is convinced that Violet has her baby. Earlier in the episode, Violet thinks that Katie is off her psychiatric medications as Katie, who recently experienced a miscarriage, is almost euphoric about Violet's pregnancy. In the end, Katie blames Violet for her own unsuccessful pregnancy and is determined to hold Violet hostage until she gives her the baby. However, Katie begins to follow instructions for a caesarian section from a textbook, claiming she cannot wait for a normal delivery since she knows she will be arrested. Violet begins to instruct Katie on the C-section to save the baby's life, since she fears she cannot save her own. The season ends with Katie preparing to cut into Violet's belly.

=== Season Three ===
At the beginning of Season 3, Pete and Naomi find Violet barely alive in a pool of blood, with her baby gone. She's rushed to the hospital where Naomi and Addison work frantically to save her life. While waiting, Pete and Sheldon argue over the fact that Violet knew something was wrong with Katie and they didn't believe her. Meanwhile, Katie shows up at the hospital with Violet's baby and Pete and Cooper convince her to let them make sure the baby is all right. She relents and they take the baby and she is arrested. Addison works to save the baby while Naomi works to save Violet. In the end both surgeries are a success and Violet later awakens, asking for her baby.

A month after being rescued, Violet is still trying to recover from her trauma. Pete lives with her and takes care of her and baby Lucas. Violet won't leave her house and has panic attacks every time the doorbell rings. After getting advice from Sheldon, Pete decides to move out, to help Violet recover and push her to go outside. Violet realizes that after dramatic events in her life she can't bond with her baby and gives Lucas to Pete, asking him to take care of the baby. Sheldon then files a paternity suit but the results reveal that Pete is the baby's father. Later during Katie Kent's trial, Violet lets Katie off by saying she was delusional during the attack which further agitates Pete. When Violet sleeps with Addison's father, Pete gives up on her.

Violet refuses to have anything to do with Lucas at all and eventually runs off on vacation with Cooper. When Cooper returns, Violet is not with him. It isn't until much later Violet returns, obviously more calm and sane. While gone she spent time in New York working through her issues with a therapist and has come home to try to be a mother to Lucas.

When Violet returns, she finds Pete in a relationship with Addison, something that causes her much pain. She tells Pete she wants shared custody, which he staunchly refuses. They get into a court battle in which everyone, including Cooper, says that she is unfit to share parenting duties completely. She confesses that she's still in love with Pete. Even though the judge rules in favor of Pete, he agrees to slowly start introducing Violet to co-parenting Lucas. In the season 3 finale, Addison tells Pete he should be with Violet and they once again resume a relationship.

=== Season Four ===
In the Season 4 premiere Pete pops the question after a morning of passion. Later the same day Violet announces to their friends that she and Pete are getting married...that following weekend. She asks Cooper to be her maid of honor, but his objective side meddles to such a degree that seeds of doubt are planted in Violet's head and she proceeds to bolt from the ceremony. Pete follows her and without saying a word, he convinces her to take a leap of faith and the two finally get married. Violet later discovers that she is being sued by former patient Katie Kent and in the season four finale she gets her license suspended. Against Pete's wishes, she decides to leave town on a book tour.

=== Season Five ===
After Pete has a heart attack, Violet is nowhere to be found because she's at the airport and inadvertently counsels a woman in an abusive relationship. She returns to the hospital after learning about Pete's heart attack. During his recovery, he verbally abuses and berates Violet constantly, as she tries to get back into the practice and have her license reinstated. She soon tells Pete she will not be his punching bag. She also knows he's struggling as it's a sign and pattern. Violet begins to feel as though Pete hates her. When she begins work on a probationary period, Sheldon lets the past interfere but Pete forces him to rethink his issues and Sheldon apologizes. Violet realizes Pete is trying. Trying doesn't work and both begin to feel that the marriage isn't working. Violet turns to Addison and the two become friends and companions much to the annoyance of Pete and Sam. While talking with Sam and Addison about their relationship, she has an epiphany about her marriage with Pete and after some discussion, the two decide to separate.

=== Season Six ===
In the season premiere Violet is left wondering where Pete is as his court date has arrived and he's not there. Throughout the episode Violet and the rest of the practice debate whether he has fallen into some trouble or he decided to make a run for it. The only clue available is a text message from Pete to Violet stating, "No matter what happens, know that I love you. I'm out on a run". Speculation flies as Violet considers whether Pete meant a jog or a flight out of the country. In the last minutes of the episode it is revealed by Violet in a conversation with Cooper that police have informed her Pete had fallen off a hill while on a run and suffered a fatal heart attack. Because he was out of immediate sight, help couldn't arrive in time and he died. Violet is in shock, stating she could hardly believe it was Pete and she didn't know how to break the news to their three-year-old son. As per Pete's will, Violet throws a party rather than a funeral, having a difficult time dealing with people talking about how Pete helped them and getting high on pot in the bathroom. She tries to sing, but ends up breaking down, screaming over how he could leave them. In the final episode, after Addison's wedding, she publishes her second book called "Private Practice" which is about life and joy.

== Reception ==
Robert Bianco for USA Today has praised Brenneman's talent in the role of Violet, but has opined that she is "incredibly badly used". Variety's Cynthia Littleton has noted that Brenneman as Violet is the most intriguing of the show's supporting ensemble, both as an actor and a character.
