= Brian Benben =

American actor (born 1956)

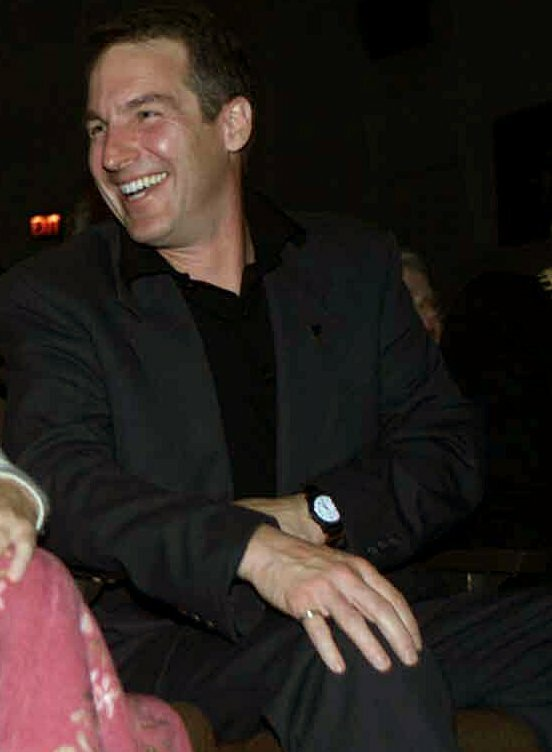
- Benben in 2002
- Born: Brian Edward Benben; June 18, 1956 (age 70); Winchester, Virginia, U.S.
- Occupations: Film, stage and television actor
- Years active: 1981–present
- Spouse: Madeleine Stowe (m. 1982)
- Children: 1

Brian Edward Benben (born June 18, 1956) is an American actor, best known for his role as Martin Tupper in the HBO comedy television series Dream On (1990–1996), and also known as Sheldon Wallace on ABC medical drama Private Practice (2008–2013), and as Larry in I Come in Peace (1990).

== Early life and career ==
Benben was born in Winchester, Virginia, the son of Gloria Patricia (née Coffman) and Peter Michael Benben Sr., a produce buyer.

He later lived and attended high school in Marlboro, New York, followed by two years at Ulster County Community College in Stone Ridge, New York, after which he moved to New York City, where he had various jobs while auditioning and acting. In 1983 he appeared in the Broadway production of John Byrne's play Slab Boys with Kevin Bacon, Sean Penn, Val Kilmer and Jackie Earle Haley. The play ran on Broadway for 48 performances.

Although his first national exposure was in the 1981 NBC miniseries-then-series The Gangster Chronicles, he appeared in Matlock 'The Heiress' in 1988. Benben is perhaps best known for his leading role in the 1990–96 HBO television series, Dream On. He played a "by the book" FBI agent in the 1990 film Dark Angel (known in the U.S. as I Come in Peace).

He had a starring role in the 1994, film Radioland Murders playing Mary Stuart Masterson's estranged husband. In September 1998, he starred in an eponymous primetime CBS sitcom, The Brian Benben Show, which lasted only one month on the air. In the 2000s, he played Sheldon Wallace on Shonda Rhimes's Private Practice. His character was first introduced in December 2008, later became a recurring character, and finally a series regular. In 2014, he appeared in the television series Scandal, also produced by Rhimes.

== Personal life ==
In 1982, Benben married actress Madeleine Stowe, whom he met filming The Gangster Chronicles. Together they have one daughter, born in 1996. Benben and Stowe live in Pacific Palisades and prior to that lived west of Austin, near Johnson City, Texas.

== Filmography ==
Television
Year	Title	Role	Other notes
1981	The Gangster Chronicles	Michael Lasker	Main role
1986	Kay O'Brien	Mark Doyle	Main role
1990–1996	Dream On	Martin Tupper	Main role CableACE Awards for Actor in a Comedy Series (1993)
1998	The Brian Benben Show	Brian Benben	Lead role; also co-executive producer
2003	Kingpin	Heywood Klein	Main role
2005	Masters of Horror	Dwight Faraday	Episode: "Deer Woman"
2008–2013	Private Practice	Sheldon Wallace	Recurring role (Seasons 2–3); Main role (Seasons 4–6)
2014	Scandal	Leonard Carnahan	Episode: "An Innocent Man"
2015	Grace and Frankie	Charlie	Episode: "The Earthquake"
2016	Roadies	Preston	Recurring role
2017–2018	Imposters	Max	Main role

Film
Year	Title	Role	Other notes
1981	Gangster Wars	Michael Lasker	Based on The Gangster Chronicles
1988	Clean and Sober	Martin Laux	
1989	Mortal Sins	Nathan Weinschank	
1990	I Come in Peace	Special Agent Arwood 'Larry' Smith	was released as Dark Angel outside the US
1994	Radioland Murders	Roger Henderson	
2001	The Flamingo Rising (Made for TV movie)	Hubert T. Lee	Hubert Lee decides to open the world's largest drive-in movie theater across the street from a funeral parlor.
