= Hart of Dixie season 2 =

Hart of Dixie
- Season 2
- DVD cover
- No. of episodes: 22

Release
- Original network: The CW
- Original release: October 2, 2012 – May 7, 2013

Season chronology
- ← Previous; Season 1 Next → Season 3

The second season of Hart of Dixie an American television series, originally aired in the United States on The CW from October 2, 2012 through May 7, 2013, with a total of 22 episodes. The seasonis produced by CBS Television Studios. Hart of Dixie was renewed for a third season on April 26, 2013.

== Overview ==
The season begins with Zoe confused by her feelings for both George and Wade. She later decides that George isn't ready for another relationship and decides to see Wade. Levon's former high school sweetheart Ruby Jeffries, played by Golden Brooks, returns to Bluebell and reveals she is opposing for mayor. George begins dating again, first seeing newcomer Shelby (Laura Bell Bundy); however, he later dumps her and Shelby begins dating Brick Breeland, and George later starts a relationship with Wade's ex-wife Tansy Truitt (Mircea Monroe). As the season progresses, Ruby leaves after Lemon's jealousy destroys her and Lavon. Wade and Zoe continue to date, but face setbacks time and time again. Annabeth begins having feelings for Levon and later the two sleep together, leaving Lemon devastated by her best friend's betrayal.

== Cast and characters ==
=== Regular ===
- Rachel Bilson as Dr. Zoe Hart
- Jaime King as Lemon Breeland
- Cress Williams as Lavon Hayes
- Wilson Bethel as Wade Kinsella
- Tim Matheson as Dr. Brick Breeland
- Scott Porter as George Tucker

=== Recurring ===
- Kaitlyn Black as Annabeth Nass
- Reginald VelJohnson as Dash DeWitt
- Brandi Burkhardt as Crickett Watts
- McKaley Miller as Rose Hattenbarger
- Claudia Lee as Magnolia Breeland
- Golden Brooks as Ruby Jeffries
- Mircea Monroe as Tansy Truitt
- Laura Bell Bundy as Shelby Sinclair
- Travis Van Winkle as Jonah Breeland
- Armelia McQueen as Shula Whitaker
- JoBeth Williams as Candice Hart
- John Marshall Jones as Wally Maynard
- Amy Ferguson as Lily Anne Lonergan
- Charlie Robinson as Sergeant Jeffries
- Ross Philips as Tom Long
- Mallory Moye as Wanda Lewis
- Matt Lowe as Meatball
- Steven M. Porter as Frank Moth
- Peter Mackenzie as Reverend Peter Mayfair
- Christopher Curry as Earl Kinsella
- John Eric Bentley as Sheriff Bill
- Alan Autry as Todd Gainey
- Joe Massingill as Cody
- Dawn Didawick as Eugenia
- Kim Robillard as Sal
- Esther Scott as Delma Warner
- Mary Page Keller as Emily Chase
- Carla Renata as Susie
- Ilene Graff as Clora Tucker
- Kelen Coleman as Presley
- Megan Ferguson as Daisy
- Lindsey Van Horn as Amy-Rose
- Bayne Gibby as Shanetta
- McKayla Maroney as Tonya
- Matt Hobby as Rudy Pruitt
- Bill Parks as Chicken Truitt
- Kevin Sheridan as Rockett Truitt
- Eric Pierpoint as Harold Tucker

=== Special guest stars ===
- Robert Buckley as Peter
- Debra Jo Rupp as Wanda Lewis's mother

== Episodes ==
No. overall	No. in season	Title	Directed by	Written by	Original release date	Prod. code	U.S. viewers (millions)
23	1	"I Fall to Pieces"	Tim Matheson	Leila Gerstein	October 2, 2012	2J7251	1.53
The day after George walked out on Lemon, he struggles with his growing feelings to Zoe, who tells him about her tryst with Wade. Now that Zoe knows the true feelings of both George and Wade, she must choose between the two men. Zoe seeks the advice of former Bluebell resident Ruby Jeffries (Golden Brooks). The two become fast friends, but no one in Bluebell is excited to see Ruby return, especially Lavon, who has a history with her. Brick continues to blame Zoe and George for Lemon's depression, which gets in the way with his date with Emily. Meanwhile, Lemon decides to move on from George and start over fresh by finding a job and her own apartment. However, Lemon has no experience with living on her own and she ends up, of all places, at Zoe's house to ramble on about her life. The townspeople mistakenly think that Lemon intends to hurt Zoe after seeing her enter holding a cake knife, and George and Wade get into a fistfight over Zoe.
24	2	"Always on My Mind"	Anton Cropper	Carter Covington	October 9, 2012	2J7252	1.19
Zoe finds herself trying to help Rose find someone to perform at her Bluebell rock concert. Meanwhile, Lemon gets hired at the Rammer Jammer as a waitress, but does a terrible job. Lavon and Ruby continue to get to know each other more. Ruby later tells Lavon that she is running against him for mayor.
25	3	"If It Makes You Happy"	Elodie Keene	Alex Taub	October 16, 2012	2J7253	1.40
Distraught after learning that her old medical school has listed her occupation as "retired", Zoe tries to get published by her medical alumni magazine to show that she is still in the medical business. When Tom walks in the office with a strange rash, Zoe suspects it may be leprosy, and enlists Wade to help her capture an armadillo on Crazy Earl's property. Meanwhile, George goes a date with Shelby (Laura Bell Bundy), a woman from out of town. Upon hearing about George's date, Lemon has a "girls' night out" with Annabeth, where she meets an attractive dentist named Walt Blodgett. Also, Brick is still resentful towards George for breaking Lemon's heart at the altar and he ruins his date with Shelby. With Ruby now running against him for mayor, Lavon begins thinking about why he became mayor in the first place.
26	4	"Suspicious Minds"	John Stephens	Jamie Gorenberg	October 23, 2012	2J7254	1.32
Though Zoe is trying to keep things casual with Wade, she starts to feel jealous when she sees him with another woman. Zoe decides to get back at Wade by going out on a date with Ruby's cousin Zack to make Wade jealous. Lavon reluctantly agrees to hire Lemon as his campaign manager, but he unexpectedly finds himself in the middle of a town scandal when he takes the fall for her when Lemon is caught shoplifting a home pregnancy test, a move which could cost him the mayoral race. Meanwhile, with Lemon no longer living at home and on Annabeth's ex-husband's houseboat, Brick and Magnolia struggle with household chores and come up with a plan to get Lemon to move back home. Elsewhere, George deals with Shelby's continuing neediness when she shows up at his place after thinking he's invited her over for a dinner date when in fact he wants to break up with her.
27	5	"Walkin' After Midnight"	Joe Lazarov	Veronica Becker & Sarah Kucserka	October 30, 2012	2J7255	1.41
Zoe finds out that George has been sleepwalking into her bedroom. She agrees to cure him, and cancels date plans with Wade. After Zoe "cures" George of his sleepwalking, they talk and Zoe tells George that she is seeing someone, who she has real feelings for, and that he should do the same. Lavon and Annabeth start a fake relationship so Lavon can get major votes from a (big) family who are rivals of Lavon's alma mater. However, Lavon and Annabeth's plan rubs Lemon the wrong way.
28	6	"I Walk the Line"	Tim Matheson	Donald Todd	November 13, 2012	2J7256	1.62
It's Election Day and every vote counts to decide whether Lavon or Ruby will be mayor. Zoe tries to figure out why Brick has been acting so flustered. Zoe agrees to teach Magnolia how to drive in exchange for asking Brick to examine him. Lemon goes to great lengths to ensure that Lavon wins the election when she finds him still hooked on Ruby. Meanwhile, Wade recruits George to try to convince his ex-wife Tansy, who is currently living in a trailer on the outskirts of town, to come back in order to vote, but George finds himself drawn to her instead when Wade hooks up Tansy's trailer to his pickup truck to force her to move back to Bluebell for the day.
29	7	"Baby, Don't Get Hooked on Me"	Michael Schultz	Carter Covington	November 20, 2012	2J7257	1.23
Zoe treats Max, the kicker of the high school football team, who then develops a crush on her. Zoe tries to let him down easy, but the town wants her to continue the charade with Max until his team wins the big homecoming game. Meanwhile, Annabeth is reluctant to start a catering business with Lemon. Ruby's grumpy grandfather Sergeant Jefferies still refuses to forgive Lavon for breaking Ruby's heart years ago.
30	8	"Achy Breaky Hearts"	Janice Cooke	Alex Taub	November 27, 2012	2J7258	1.39
Zoe and Lemon are both struggling to accept Lavon's new relationship with Ruby, so they set out to uncover Ruby's true intentions. Meanwhile, Wade agrees to supervise a Little Rangers camping trip, hoping to avoid a potentially awkward confrontation with George. However, when George unexpectedly shows up on the camping trip, their conversation forces Wade to see his relationship in a different light. Brick wants to take his relationship with Emily to the next level, but he is surprised to learn who is uncomfortable with the plan.
31	9	"Sparks Fly"	Norman Buckley	Jamie Gorenberg	December 4, 2012	2J7259	1.60
Wade starts to feel like he is nothing more than a placeholder in Zoe's life and decides that they should go on an date. They decide on a "proper date" as participants in the town's annual bachelors' picnic basket auction. Tom's is claimed by Wanda, but several couples fail to properly determine the basket contents and thus get mismatched; Lemon gets stuck with Lavon instead of dentist Walt Blodgett. George is stuck with Wade's fierce ex-wife Tansy, who takes him on a mission to help her steal back the dog she lost in divorce. Lemon pushes Brick to enter and he gets stuck with a cellphone app-addicted teacher.
32	10	"Blue Christmas"	Patrick Norris	Leila Gerstein	December 11, 2012	2J7260	1.41
Zoe finds herself anxious that her ever-critical mother will be visiting Bluebell soon for the holidays. In order to avoid spending quality time with her mother, she busies herself with a patient but potentially ruins Christmas Eve for the whole town by giving the man playing Santa Claus the day off. Trying to fix the problem, Zoe upsets Wade by turning to his alcoholic father, Crazy Earl (Christopher Curry) to ask him to play Santa at the town's annual Christmas party... a part he gave up years ago after the death of Wade's mother, which drove Earl to drinking. Meanwhile, Lavon is desperate to make the week special for Ruby, but his plan goes awry when Lemon gets involved. Elsewhere, George is struggling with picking out the perfect present for Tansy. A wedding ring left in the Joseph suit starts the rumor George is going to propose to Tansy, but it's Lavon's desperate attempt to persuade Ruby to stay in town. Zoe gets caught in ill-conceived lies to pretend to be a total success for her mother, who actually gives her the needed nudge to humbly make up with Wade. Also, George catches Brick in bed with Shelby.
33	11	"Old Alabama"	David Paymer	Veronica Becker & Sarah Kucserka	January 15, 2013	2J7261	1.37
With Lavon preoccupied with his personal life, he lets his mayoral duties slip at the worst time, as Bluebell's Pioneer Day is fast approaching and a reporter from Southern Living magazine is in town. Seeing that he needs help, Zoe and Wade volunteer to help him out by playing Bluebell's "Founding Couple". Zoe is also trying a new tack when it comes to her relationship with Wade, which has her taking on many new projects. Lemon and Annabeth devise a plan to get Lavon to let them cater the First Feast, in order to get some publicity for their new business. Meanwhile, George gives advice to Brick on how to handle his new relationship with Shelby.
34	12	"Islands In the Stream"	Joe Lazarov	Donald Todd	January 22, 2013	2J7262	1.45
George's parents arrive in Bluebell for a visit and they quickly disapprove of Tansy as his new girlfriend. At the same time, Wade finds that he has to do the things that Zoe enjoys even if he does not like them. This leads to Mrs. Tucker luring George and Zoe to the houseboat to try to set them up after seeing that they still have chemistry between them. Meanwhile, Brick wants to tell Lemon and Magnolia about his newfound romance with Shelby. However, Lemon already suspects Brick of seeing someone, and begins to mistakenly think it might be Annabeth. Also, Annabeth meets a new visitor in town: an Englishman named Oliver, on whom she develops a crush. Lavon is suspicious and does some research to find out who Oliver really is.
35	13	"Lovesick Blues"	Ron Lagomarsino	Alex Taub	January 29, 2013	2J7263	1.32
When Zoe is alerted by the Health Department about a flu epidemic heading towards Bluebell, she puts the town on lockdown. Because of the quarantine, Wade is forced to stay at his ex-girlfriend's house, causing Zoe to become jealous. Lemon's plan for the perfect night with Walt goes awry when she begins to feel under the weather. Meanwhile, George finds himself roped into directing Lavon's tourism commercial about Bluebell's small-town charm, but it seems Lavon is more preoccupied with his co-star than his commercial.
36	14	"Take Me Home, Country Roads"	Jeremiah Chechik	Carter Covington	February 5, 2013	2J7264	1.44
George is given the responsibility of watching Tansy's most prized possession, her dog, when she leaves town for the day, but panics when the dog goes missing. Wade starts to feel frustrated by the lack of alone time with Zoe, especially when she is focused more on not losing her good status in the town to a new doctor, Jonah, who also happens to be Brick's nephew. Brick is ready to let the town know about his relationship with Shelby, but Lemon and Magnolia are doing everything they can to get rid of her while they are planning a birthday party for their father. Meanwhile, Lavon wants to take a chance on a new relationship with Annabeth, but first has to clear the air with one person: Lemon.
37	15	"The Gambler"	Jim Hayman	Dan Steele	February 19, 2013	2J7265	1.37
Wade is excited to compete in the Battle of the Bands competition so he can use the prize money to open up his own bar, but Zoe's suggestion that George play in the band ultimately backfires. Lemon finds herself alone for the weekend until she talks Magnolia into some sisterly bonding. Meanwhile, Lavon, who has seemingly given up on love after Annabeth's rejection of him, agrees to help Tom with his relationship with Wanda, which in turn opens his eyes to his own future.
38	16	"Where I Lead Me"	Kevin Mock	Leila Gerstein	February 26, 2013	2J7266	1.38
With the sudden nuptials of Wanda and Tom in Bluebell in a costume wedding, Zoe agrees to be maid of honor, which entails the difficult job of watching Wanda's crafty lush of a mother Betsy Maynard. Zoe uses her wedding duties to try to avoid the awkwardness between her and Wade, but has a feeling something is wrong. Meanwhile, Lavon hears about the neighboring town, Filmore, trying to build a shopping mall next to their local beach at Mobile Bay and he enlists George's help to fight it, but an unexpected side of George rears its ugly head during a deposition between George and Filmore's even snootier lawyer Scooter McGreevey. Elsewhere, Cricket drags Lemon to a Gypsy fortuneteller, who says she has already met her true love, which seems to fit the town nut Dale King, but she ultimately makes up instead with Annabeth.
39	17	"We Are Never Ever Getting Back Together"	David Paymer	Jamie Gorenberg	March 5, 2013	2J7267	1.50
Zoe, recently hurt by Wade and confused as to be angry or sad, accidentally lets her insecurity rub off on Rose and her boyfriend Max's relationship when Jonah makes a lighthearted move on her, which makes Zoe mistakenly think that Max may have cheated on Rose. Meanwhile, Wade and Lavon are forced by Reverend Peter Mayfair to work together at the congregation's annual fundraiser, which causes tension between the two. When money goes missing, and Wade is Lavon's first suspect. Magnolia and Lemon try to sabotage their father's relationship with Shelby by snooping around her open house with the help of George and discovering Shelby's "secret". George and Lemon share a staged kiss.
40	18	"Why Don't We Get Drunk?"	Rebecca Asher	Veronica Becker & Sarah Kucserka	April 9, 2013	2J7268	1.20
Lavon's big plans of making Bluebell a Spring Break destination hit a roadblock when the competing town of Filmore tries to lure the partiers away. With the help of the visiting Ruby Jeffries, Lavon creates a "hands-on-a-boat" competition that is bound to attract some attention. Eager to join in some much-deserved fun, Zoe agrees to give partying a try with Jonah Breeland, but seeing them together makes George jealous. Wade and Lemon decide to compete in Lavon's contest in order to win the grand prize to buy the Rammer Jammer, which they have learned is for sale after Wally decides to sell. Meanwhile, Brick has been acting odd and when everyone begins to notice they force him to seek medical treatment but after getting an MRI, he says everything is fine.
41	19	"This Kiss" "The Kiss"	Bethany Rooney	Leila Gerstein	April 16, 2013	2J7269	1.30
When the town decides to put on a performance of Shakespeare's most iconic scenes, George and Zoe refuse to play Romeo and Juliet, but eventually agree just to prove to everyone that they are over each other. Lemon and Wade are excited about taking over the reins at the Rammer Jammer as co-owners, but things come to a halt when they lose all the staff two days before the grand re-opening. Meanwhile, Brick decides to offer a week of free counseling to everyone in Bluebell and winds up helping the two most unlikely people, Zoe and Lavon, but in his effort to help others he learns a secret he has been keeping from himself.
42	20	"If Tomorrow Never Comes"	Jim Hayman	Alex Taub	April 23, 2013	2J7270	1.10
After Zoe tricks Jonah into spilling a secret about Brick, she unintentionally makes things worse for Brick in his love life with Shelby. Following Brick's advice, Zoe decides she must finally express her feelings, but timing never seems to be her strong suit. Wade and Lemon must learn to work together, but things go awry when they each try to prove that they know what is best for the new Rammer Jammer. Knowing what Wade and Lemon are up to, Lavon and Annabeth agree to not get involved, but that might be easier said than done. Meanwhile, Tansy's three hillbilly brothers surprise her with an unexpected visit, leaving George to look after them and put up with their wild antics.
43	21	"I'm Moving On"	Janice Cooke	Donald Todd	April 30, 2013	2J7271	1.20
Zoe's attempts at online dating hit a few snags until Rose and Max take matters into their own hands and play matchmaker by setting her up with Max's father to be their chaperones at their high school junior prom. Faced with yet another setback with the Rammer Jammer when it gets closed by the state health board, Lemon and Wade are close to throwing in the towel. George tries everything he can think of to prove to Tansy that they belong together, but she still has her doubts. Brick lends Lemon and Wade enough money to clean up the Rammer Jammer for it to re-open. Brick and Shelby decide that they might have acted too rashly, which forces them to make a difficult decision about their future together. Meanwhile, Lavon refuses Annabeth's help in stopping the continue feud with the competing town's mayor, leaving her to take a different tack.
44	22	"On the Road Again"	Tim Matheson	Leila Gerstein & Len Goldstein	May 7, 2013	2J7272	1.19
Zoe wakes up and realizes she slept with Wade the night before. George walks in to discover them. Needing some distance from her life, Zoe decides to travel to New York City for a wedding. After Tansy breaks up with George and leaves town, he is more alone and depressed than ever until Lily Ann approaches and offers an outlet for his emotions by writing and singing. Elsewhere, the corrupt and smarmy Mayor Gainy of Filmore kidnaps Lavon's pet alligator, which leads to Lavon assembling a group of local misfits (Wanda, Tom, Reverend Mayfair, Meatball, Sergeant Jefferies, and Frank) to try to reclaim it. Lemon attempts to get the band Gloriana to perform at the Rammer Jammer and she enlists Wade to drive her to try to meet with the band to play. George leaves town with Lily Ann to go on tour with her. Lavon and Annabeth admit their love for each other after she saves him and his group. On the flight, Zoe and Jonah must work together to save the life of an injured passenger, which makes the plane make an emergency landing in Atlanta. After hearing Zoe's flight made an emergency landing, Wade deviates from his road trip plan with Lemon to Birmingham to drive to Atlanta where by chance, he meets with Zoe and tells her that he loves her. Zoe tells Wade that she has already decided she is going to stay in New York for the summer... at Jonah's suggestion.

== Casting ==
Season two saw the return of several characters from season one and also introduced new characters. Mircea Monroe returned as Tansy Truitt, who begins a relationship with George Tucker. Kaitlyn Black's character Annabeth Nass, become a more prominent character in the second season. Laura Bell Bundy was introduced in the first episode as Shelby a love interest for George Tucker, however, later beings a relationship Brick. Golden Brooks was cast as Ruby Jeffries and was announced on August 8, 2012 Ruby arrives as an old rival of Lemon and an old flame of Levon. Travis Van Winkle was cast as the Breeland cousin, Jonah, who becomes a love interest for Zoe. Eisa Davis who played Addie Pickett in season one did not return for season two as did Deborah S. Craig who played Shelley Ng.

== Reception ==
The season premiered to 1.53 million people with a 0.7 rating share for adults 18-49.

== Home release ==
Hart of Dixie: The Complete Second Season was released on DVD in the U.S. on October 15, 2013. The 5 disc set includes all 22 episodes from the second season and various language and subtitle options.

The Complete Second Season
Set details			Special features
22 episodes; 924 minutes (Region 1); TBA (Region 2); 893 minutes (Region 4); 5-disc set; 1.78:1 aspect ratio; Languages: English (Dolby Digital 5.1); Subtitles: English (Region 4)			No special features
Release dates			No special features
United States	United Kingdom	Australia	No special features
October 15, 2013	October 20, 2013	November 13, 2013	No special features
