= Hart of Dixie season 3 =

Hart of Dixie
- Season 3
- DVD cover
- No. of episodes: 22

Release
- Original network: The CW
- Original release: October 7, 2013 – May 16, 2014

Season chronology
- ← Previous; Season 2 Next → Season 4

The third season of Hart of Dixie, an American television series, was originally broadcast in the United States on The CW from October 7, 2013 to May 16, 2014. It was produced by CBS Television Studios. Hart of Dixie was renewed for a fourth season on May 8, 2014 and which premiered on December 15, 2014.

== Overview ==
The season begins with Zoe returning to Bluebell with her new boyfriend (Joel) played by Josh Cooke. George struggles to rebuild his life following his break up with Tansy but finds love with Lavon's younger cousin. Lemon finds herself in a scandalous relationship while Annabeth hopes her relationship with Lavon will grow into something more. Zoe begins to learn more about her family roots in Bluebell.

== Cast and characters ==
=== Regular ===
- Rachel Bilson as Dr. Zoe Hart
- Jaime King as Lemon Breeland
- Cress Williams as Lavon Hayes
- Wilson Bethel as Wade Kinsella
- Kaitlyn Black as Annabeth Nass
- Tim Matheson as Dr. Brick Breeland
- Scott Porter as George Tucker

=== Recurring ===
- Josh Cooke as Joel Stephens
- Reginald VelJohnson as Dash DeWitt
- Brandi Burkhardt as Crickett Watts
- Tony Cavalero as Stanley Watts
- McKaley Miller as Rose Hattenbarger
- Claudia Lee as Magnolia Breeland
- Mircea Monroe as Tansy Truitt
- Laura Bell Bundy as Shelby Sinclair
- Armelia McQueen as Shula Whitaker
- Lauren Bittner as Vivian Wilkes
- Cole Sand as Harley Wilkes Jr.
- Barry Watson as Davis Polk
- JoBeth Williams as Candice Hart
- John Marshall Jones as Wally Maynard
- Charlie Robinson as Sergeant Jeffries
- Amy Ferguson as Lily Anne Lonergan
- Karla Mosley as Elodie Baxte
- Maree Cheatham as Bettie Breeland
- Ryan McPartlin as Carter Covington
- Anne Ramsay as Winifred Wilkes
- Ross Philips as Tom Long
- Mallory Moye as Wanda Lewis
- Antoinette Robertson as Lynly Hayes
- Matt Lowe as Meatball
- Steven M. Porter as Frank Moth
- Peter Mackenzie as Reverend Peter Mayfair
- Christopher Curry as Earl Kinsella
- John Eric Bentley as Sheriff Bill
- Alan Autry as Todd Gainey
- Joe Massingill as Cody
- Kim Robillard as Sal
- Esther Scott as Delma Warner
- Carla Renata as Susie
- Reggie Hayes as Don Todd
- Nicole J. Butler as Prizzi Pritchett
- Nakia Burrise as Patty Pritchett
- Megan Ferguson as Daisy
- Lindsey Van Horn as Amy-Rose
- Bayne Gibby as Shanetta
- McKayla Maroney as Tonya
- Aynsley Bubbico as Sadie
- Matt Hobby as Rudy Pruitt
- Bill Parks as Chicken Truitt
- Kevin Sheridan as Rockett Truitt
- Tony Cavalero as Stanley Watts
- Lawrence Pressman as Vernon 'Brando' Wilkes

=== Special guest star ===
- Robert Buckley as Peter

== Episodes ==
No. overall	No. in season	Title	Directed by	Written by	Original release date	Prod. code	U.S. viewers (millions)
45	1	"Who Says You Can't Go Home"	Bethany Rooney	Leila Gerstein	October 7, 2013	2J7651	1.03
After working for three months in a busy emergency room at a New York City hospital, Zoe returns to Bluebell with her new author boyfriend Joel. Everyone hates her because she sent them an email saying she was leaving forever. Zoe has to get Brick to sign a reference for her to a doctor in New York. Zoe also misses everyone and she learns what went on during her absence. Annabeth is still with Lavon; Lavon's cousin, Lynly, is in town and is getting on everyone's nerves. Meanwhile, no one has seen or talked to George since he left for his tour. Brick and his fiancée, Shelby, broke up, and Lemon is sleeping with an unknown man. Lemon finds an upset and disheveled George living in a seedy motel room, having not left it for two months. He tells Lemon that Tansy has moved to nearby Filmore, where she now has her own beauty salon and lives with that town's lawyer, Scooter McGreevey. Zoe has to decide whether to leave or to stay in Bluebell for good.
46	2	"Friends in Low Places"	Elodie Keene	Sheila Lawrence	October 14, 2013	2J7652	1.06
Trying to be hospitable to Joel, who is visiting Bluebell, Lavon and Annabeth invite him and Zoe over for a quiet dinner, but when Lemon meets Alabama's most eligible bachelor, Carter Covington, she invites herself along with Carter to the soiree. However, when some unexpected guests show up to the party, Lemon's ruse with being romantically involved with Wade to shield her secret tryst with Meatball risks being exposed. Meanwhile, George makes a bad decision involving bedding down Lynly, which could ultimately ruin his friendship with Lavon.
47	3	"Take This Job and Shove It"	Jim Hayman	Alex Taub	October 21, 2013	2J7653	1.05
Trying to avoid a confrontation with Brick, Zoe begins discreetly seeing patients in Bluebell again. But her plan goes awry when George informs her she has a non-compete clause in her contract that prevents her from practicing for a year in the town. Lavon is thrilled at the chance to bring a minor league baseball team to Bluebell, but needs Brick's help to woo the team's owner. Elsewhere, Lemon finds herself in hot water with the Belles after she tries to overthrow the current leader Crickett. Meanwhile, George finds himself needing medical attention during a tutoring session with Lynly, forcing him to call Zoe for help.
48	4	"Help Me Make It Through the Night"	Tim Matheson	Jamie Gorenberg	October 28, 2013	2J7654	1.05
After Lemon's fallout with the Belles, she is blacklisted from the Junior League Halloween Masquerade party, so she calls her overbearing Grandma Bettie for help and lands herself a date with another of Alabama's most eligible bachelors. Lavon has a big surprise for his first anniversary with Annabeth, but when she has a health scare, she turns to Zoe to help her out. Meanwhile, during the party, George has to do damage control with the town judges and Wade keeps finding himself in trouble with ineligible ladies.
49	5	"How Do You Like Me Now?"	David Paymer	Sarah Kucserka & Veronica West	November 4, 2013	2J7655	1.00
Zoe is blissfully happy when she sees how well Joel is adjusting to Bluebell, until, she learns the townspeople might have a different opinion of him. Wanting to make things better, Zoe volunteers herself and Joel to chaperone the Go Girl Tween Adventure Camp, but when Joel refuses to go along, she is left to fix the town's perception on her own. After a rough start with Lynly, George is pleasantly surprised when he learns they work well together. Meanwhile, Lavon is desperate to be part of the Gazebos of Alabama calendar, but when a crucial flower mistake jeopardizes his plan, Lavon begs Lemon to help save the day.
50	6	"Family Tradition"	Jim Hayman	Dan Steele	November 11, 2013	2J7656	1.11
Zoe and Joel are ready to find a more permanent place to live and find the perfect place is actually owned by a relative of Zoe's biological father's relatives, who is Vivian Wilkes. After tracking Vivian down, Zoe is unsure whether she is ready to face her extended family when she crashes a birthday party for Vivian's young son. Due to the success Lemon and Wade have had with the Rammer Jammer, Lemon receives an offer that she may not be able to refuse. Annabeth seems eager for Lavon to go out of town, causing him to wonder what she is up to. Meanwhile, George and Lynly's connection continues to grow, but George is still reluctant to make a move.
51	7	"I Run To You"	Brandi Bradburn	Sheila Lawrence	November 18, 2013	2J7657	1.03
Zoe begins to grow leery of how much time Joel and Wade hang out, especially when it begins to interfere with Joel's writing. Ready to blame it all on Wade, Zoe does her best to entice Joel back into writing. Lavon is using the excuse of coaching his track team to avoid talking to Annabeth. Meanwhile, Lemon encourages Brick to start dating again. George and Lynly discuss whether they want to talk to Lavon about their feelings for each other.
52	8	"Miracles"	David Paymer	Leila Gerstein	November 25, 2013	2J7658	1.01
Joel's grandma visits for Hanukkah. Zoe finds herself in the middle of family drama with Vivian Wilkes when she invites her uncle to Hanukkah celebration. Lemon, with the help of George and Lynly, does some recon work on Shelby who says she is pregnant via artificial insemination. Tansy returns to Bluebell and convinces Wade to go to the dentist for his tooth ache, and to find a more suitable girlfriend than the girls he has been going after lately. he agrees provided she takes a job behind the bar as he needs bar staff.
53	9	"Something to Talk About"	Mary Lou Belli	Alex Taub	January 13, 2014	2J7659	1.19
George and Lavon enlist Tansy's help to try to figure out why Filmore is interested in merging towns. Zoe concocts a fake story involving an affair between Annabeth and Joel in hopes to distract the townspeople before they find out about the potential merger. Wade and Vivian go on a date but she has second thoughts after speaking to Zoe about Wade. Shelby asks Brick to go with her to pregnancy classes - she is suddenly afraid of being a single mom. Lemon is away taking care of her grandmother who broke her hip.
54	10	"Star of the Show"	John Stephens	Kendall Sand	January 20, 2014	2J7660	1.00
Shelby asks Brick to help with her new singing cabaret. Feeling overwhelmed, he asks Zoe to direct, with ulterior motive of tanking the show, and getting Shelby to leave. Zoe plans to put on a production about biology, but when she realizes it is lousy, Shelby saves the day. Lavon thinks the town merger is inevitable, until the Belles (with help from Lemon via video chat) scheme to keep the governor's sister in town, who loves the cabaret. Lynly grows jealous of George's relationship with Tansy. Wade is excited about his growing relationship with Vivian, but is confused when she cancels their dates. She later reveals late night dates were too much for her as a single mom.
55	11	"One More Last Chance"	Kevin Mock	Jamie Gorenberg	January 27, 2014	2J7661	1.16
Lavon and the town try to convince the Lt. Governor that Bluebell should be named a historic town. Zoe and Joel still cannot find a place to live and their dream apartment is owned by Vivian's aunt who hates New Yorkers. Vivian's son will not warm up to Wade. Zoe and Wade agree to talk each other up to the Wilkes family. When Wade loses little Harley's lizard, Zoe takes the fall, losing her chance at the apartment. Wade comes clean with Harley, who vows to break up Wade and Vivian. Lynly's jealousy for Tansy peaks and she and George break up. Shelby confesses her pregnancy to the Lt. Governor, who is the father of her baby, and leaves Bluebell to raise the child with him.
56	12	"Should've Been a Cowboy"	Les Butler	Sarah Kucserka & Veronica West	February 3, 2014	2J7662	1.21
Joel follows around Wade for research for his book. George is afraid Lavon is mad at him for what happened with Lynly. Annabeth throws a bachelorette party for a Belle, which causes her to examine her own relationship with Lavon. Zoe bets Brick she can get the town to lose weight, so that she can become partner again. She loses the bet when Cricket throws a cake sale fundraiser. George decides to rekindle things with Tansy.
57	13	"Act Naturally"	Patrick Norris	Dan Steele	February 10, 2014	2J7663	1.03
It is Zoe's birthday and she has to juggle two parties.
58	14	"Here You Come Again"	Janice Cooke	Sheila Lawrence	March 21, 2014	2J7664	1.03
Lemon's return to Bluebell does not turn out as planned. Zoe's mother tries to come into Zoe's life and wants to help her get back her practice with a ruthless campaign against Brick. Magnolia has been expelled from high school and asks George for legal help.
59	15	"Ring of Fire"	Kevin Mock	Alex Taub	March 28, 2014	2J7665	0.94
Zoe and Joel are sued by Tansy's three hillbilly brothers. They seek help from George and Annabeth. Lemon's two suitors are supposed to duel for her hand at Lavon's Renaissance Fair. Wade and Vivian have difficulties with their three-months-anniversary-celebration.
60	16	"Carrying Your Love with Me"	Tim Matheson	Leila Gerstein	April 4, 2014	2J7666	0.73
Bluebell gets a sister city in France, so Lavon tries to learn French to impress their beautiful mayor. Meanwhile, Brick strives to win the town's Man of the Year title. Zoe and Joel become fed up with the remodeling problems they encounter. Lemon recruits George to assist her with a business venture.
61	17	"A Good Run of Bad Luck"	Ricardo Mendez Matta	Sarah Kucserka & Veronica West	April 11, 2014	2J7667	0.81
Zoe thinks she is cursed because she broke the wedding between George and Lemon. George and Lemon cannot stop thinking about sex together. Wade meets Vivian's ex-husband.
62	18	"Back in the Saddle Again"	Rebecca Asher	Kendall Sand	April 18, 2014	2J7668	0.80
Unwilling to put up with the town's assumption that she is still getting over Joel, Zoe reluctantly goes on a date. Lemon faces a decision when handsome journalist Peter returns to Bluebell and asks her out. Annabeth is going out with Mayor Gainey's nephew, which distracts Lavon from important business. Zoe and Lemon have to rely on each other for advice because Annabeth is unavailable. Brick has difficulties raising Magnolia. Wade realizes he may be more invested in the relationship than Vivian.
63	19	"A Better Man"	David Paymer	Jamie Gorenberg	April 25, 2014	2J7669	0.75
The Owls and Belles dual for Tom's services jeopardizing his and Wanda's attempts to make a baby. Zoe is put in the middle of Wade and Vivian's relationship, leading a heart broken Wade to blame Zoe for the outcome. George welcomes a distraction to his feelings for Lemon.
64	20	"Together Again"	Michael Schultz	Sheila Lawrence & Dan Steele	May 2, 2014	2J7670	0.66
George's faux pas in Fancie's' kitchen causes loss of business for Lemon. George and Zoe team up to try to bring a famous restaurant reviewer to the town, but for different venues. Lemon and Wade do the same, each vying for their own restaurant as well. Wanda questions trying to get pregnant and Lavon and Annabeth bury the hatchet.
65	21	"Stuck"	Mary Lou Belli	Alex Taub	May 9, 2014	2J7671	0.76
Lemon's antagonistic grandmother continues to try to get Lemon married, engaging the help of Magnolia. Rose wants to be an intern and she asks Brick to show her around the doctor's office for the whole day, which he is happy to do so in order to avoid seeing his mother as well as Magnolia. Meanwhile, George and Lavon compete with Mayor Gainey over a new freeway exit sign with unexpected results. Davis plans to propose to Annabeth while marriage is suddenly in the works for many Bluebell residents. Elsewhere, Wade and Zoe work together to help a sober Earl get out of his abandoned survival pit.
66	22	"Second Chance"	Bethany Rooney	Leila Gerstein	May 16, 2014	2J7672	0.88
Bluebell is busy with preparations for two weddings that do not go on as planned. At Lily Anne and Meatball's wedding, Zoe decides to tell Wade that she is still in love with him. At Cricket and Stan's vow renewal, Zoe is asked to be one of the bridesmaids, but Cricket "comes out" about her true sexual orientation. Meanwhile, George and Lavon meet their TV icon, Don Todd, and end up thinking about their past loves. Zoe struggles with her feelings for Wade when he decides to move to Atlanta to open a new Rammer Jammer restaurant. Joel shows up in town to visit, and making Zoe even more confused about her feelings for both Joel and Wade. Annabeth turns down Davis's proposal, stating that she still has feelings for someone else – presumably Lavon. After the burning of Fancie's that led to George leaving the business, a distraught Lemon leaves for a singles cruise, right before both George and Lavon show up at the gate to proclaim their love. At the end, Wade decides to stay in Bluebell and Zoe swears to not give up on getting him back.

== Production ==
=== Development ===
Hart of Dixie was renewed for a third season on April 26, 2013. and renewed for a fourth season on May 8, 2014.

=== Casting ===
On July 26, 2013, TVLine reported that Kaitlyn Black portrayed as Annabeth Nass had been promoted to a series regular in the season. Josh Cooke was cast in a recurring role as Zoe's new boyfriend, Joel Stephens. Ryan McPartlin was guest star as Carter Covington. Robert Buckley was guest cast to portray Peter, and Lauren Bittner was cast as Zoe's cousin, Vivian Wilkes.

== Reception ==
The season premiered to 1.03 million people with a 0.4 rating share for adults 18-49.

== Home release ==
Hart of Dixie: The Complete Third Season was released on DVD in the US on March 15, 2015. The 5 disc set includes all 22 episodes from the third season and various language and subtitle options.

The Complete Third Season
Set details			Special features
22 episodes; 924 minutes (Region 1); TBA (Region 2); 893 minutes (Region 4); 5-disc set; 1.78:1 aspect ratio; Languages: English (Dolby Digital 5.1); Subtitles: English, (Region 4)			No special features
Release Dates			No special features
United States	United Kingdom	Australia	No special features
March 17, 2015	July 27, 2015	November 5, 2014	No special features
