= Hart of Dixie season 4 =

Hart of Dixie
- Season 4
- DVD cover
- No. of episodes: 10

Release
- Original network: The CW
- Original release: December 15, 2014 – March 27, 2015

Season chronology
- ← Previous; Season 3

The fourth and final season of Hart of Dixie an American comedy-drama television series, originally aired in the United States on The CW from December 15, 2014 through March 27, 2015, with a total of 10 episodes. Hart of Dixie was cancelled after four seasons on May 7, 2015.

== Overview ==
The final season deals with Zoe's pregnancy and her relationship with Wade. George, Lemon, Lavon and Annabeth enter a tumultuous love affair while Brick has to deal with his past in order to move forward.

== Cast and characters ==
=== Regular ===
- Rachel Bilson as Dr. Zoe Hart
- Jaime King as Lemon Breeland
- Cress Williams as Lavon Hayes
- Wilson Bethel as Wade Kinsella
- Kaitlyn Black as Annabeth Nass
- Tim Matheson as Dr. Brick Breeland
- Scott Porter as George Tucker

=== Recurring ===
- Reginald VelJohnson as Dash DeWitt
- Brandi Burkhardt as Crickett Watts
- McKaley Miller as Rose Hattenbarger
- Claudia Lee as Magnolia Breeland
- Mircea Monroe as Tansy Truitt
- Laura Bell Bundy as Shelby Sinclair
- Armelia McQueen as Shula Whitaker
- Maree Cheatham as Bettie Breeland
- JoBeth Williams as Candice Hart
- John Marshall Jones as Wally Maynard
- Charlie Robinson as Sergeant Jeffries
- Karla Mosley as Elodie Baxter
- Anne Ramsay as Winifred Wilkes
- Erica Piccininni as Jaysene Charles
- Talitha Bateman as Scarlett Kincaid
- Ross Philips as Tom Long
- Mallory Moye as Wanda Lewis
- Matt Lowe as Meatball
- Steven M. Porter as Frank Moth
- Peter Mackenzie as Reverend Peter Mayfair
- Christopher Curry as Earl Kinsella
- John Eric Bentley as Sheriff Bill
- Alan Autry as Todd Gainey
- Kim Robillard as Sal
- Dawn Didawick as Eugenia
- Esther Scott as Delma Warner
- Carla Renata as Susie
- Ilene Graff as Clora Tucker
- Nicole J. Butler as Prizzi Pritchett
- Nakia Burrise as Patty Pritchett
- Megan Ferguson as Daisy
- Lindsey Van Horn as Amy-Rose
- McKayla Maroney as Tonya
- Aynsley Bubbico as Sadie
- Matt Hobby as Rudy Pruitt
- Bill Parks as Chicken Truitt
- Kevin Sheridan as Rockett Truitt
- Tony Cavalero as Stanley Watts
- Lawrence Pressman as Vernon 'Brando' Wilkes
- Eric Pierpoint as Harold Tucker

=== Special guest star ===
- Meredith Monroe as Alice Kincaid
- Autumn Reeser as Olivia Green

== Episodes ==
No. overall	No. in season	Title	Directed by	Written by	Original release date	Prod. code	U.S. viewers (millions)
67	1	"Kablang"	David Paymer	Leila Gerstein	December 15, 2014	3J5451	1.22
Zoe is excited that Wade has decided to stay in Bluebell. While he is still making it clear that he is not ready to dive back into a relationship with her, it does not stop her from trying to capture his attention. Shelby is back in town and resumes an affair with Brick behind his mother's back. Meanwhile, both George and Lavon are recruited for Bluebell's volunteer fire department and finds themselves partnered up during training. The two begrudgingly bury the hatchet, though they are both still into Lemon. However, Lemon comes back from the singles cruise early with a new boyfriend, Dr. Henry. Wade and Zoe eventually have a one-night stand and a few weeks later, Earl tries to get them back together after Wade still does not want to commit to a relationship. He ends up changing his mind, but when he asks her out, she surprisingly says no and shuts the door on him. After viewing some test results at the clinic, Annabeth assumes that Lemon is pregnant, but when Lemon divulges that she and Henry are just putting on a show to get money from her grandmother, it is revealed that it is Zoe who is actually pregnant.
68	2	"The Curling Iron"	Michael Schultz	April Blair	January 16, 2015	3J5452	1.14
As Zoe confirms her pregnancy, Wade is left confused as to why she did not take him back when he showed up at her door. She is then recruited by Rose to give a sex ed talk to a group of young girls and agrees to go on a date with Wade when she runs into him afterwards. With Zoe still keeping the secret from him, he tells her that they should take their relationship slow this time around, causing her to freak out and leave. She is later comforted by Lemon and Annabeth, who assure her that she'll be a great mother regardless. Meanwhile, Annabeth finds herself having to keep secrets for Zoe, Lemon, and Brick, while George and Lavon continue their investigation on Henry. In the end, thinking that Annabeth is about to blow all of their secrets, Lemon and Brick tell Bettie the truth about everything. Later that night, Zoe finally decides to tell Wade that she is pregnant and that she does not expect anything from him, leaving him shocked.
69	3	"The Very Good Bagel"	Richard W. Abramitis	Kendall Sand	January 23, 2015	3J5453	1.22
Wade wants to talk to Zoe about their future, but she keeps avoiding him. He decides that he needs to do something grand to show her that he's serious about still wanting to get back together and Earl suggests that he propose. With some prompting from the people around her, Zoe agrees to another dinner date, but bails and goes on a sudden trip to New York when she catches wind about the proposal. Wade ends up chasing her to the city, where he has a heartfelt talk with her mother, Candice. Wade and Zoe later reconcile. Meanwhile, Lemon is furious over the truth about Henry getting leaked to the press, which she doesn't know was George and Lavon's fault. She decides to take Crickett and Annabeth back to George's old lake house to relive the good old days. Problems arise and George and Lavon are called over. When Lavon drops Annabeth off at her house, she drunkenly blurts out that she's still in love with him. However, the next morning, George decides that he's no longer in love with Lemon and decides to push her towards Lavon instead, leaving Lavon, Lemon, and Annabeth in a very complicated situation.
70	4	"Red Dye #40"	Bethany Rooney	Tamar Laddy & Ari Posner	January 30, 2015	3J5454	1.02
When Lavon finds out that Lemon is forced to sell Fancie's, he adds a bonus to the prize pot for the town talent show to help her out. However, Shelby, who is hailed as the most talented person in Bluebell, decides to enter, threatening everyone else's chances. Shortly before the show, Shelby experiences an allergic reaction and Sheriff Bill deduces that she was sabotaged. He brings everyone to the Rammer Jammer for an inquisition. Unbeknownst to them, Wade and Zoe happen to be hiding there. Wade wants to reveal their reunion to the town, while Zoe desperately wants to keep it a secret, not wanting them to have to face tough questions of their own. When everything is settled, Shelby wins the talent show and gives Lemon the prize money in hopes of earning her approval as her father's girlfriend. Lavon confronts Lemon about their feelings for one another, but Lemon refuses to give in, as Annabeth is still a factor.
71	5	"Bar-Be-Q Burritos"	Les Butler	Adam Milch	February 6, 2015	3J5455	1.24
Zoe and Wade decide that they need to make more money to move into a new place, so she tries to ask Brick for a raise, while Wade tries to get more business for the Rammer Jammer. This proves difficult when a new food truck opens up in town, but Meatball suggests that they ask his cousin, a famous country singer, to perform at the restaurant. Pamela agrees to pay Bluebell a visit, but only on the condition that there is a luxurious bed and breakfast for her to stay at. When Zoe closes the actual bed and breakfast due to bed bugs, they transform Lavon's place into one. Meanwhile, Lemon and Lavon are still conflicted about their feelings. Annabeth needs to find money to attend nursing school, so she decides to sell her houseboat, the one that she has been renting out to George. After seeing them together, Lemon tries to set them up so that she can be with Lavon guilt-free, but her cover is eventually blown.
72	6	"Alabama Boys"	Mary Lou Belli	Leila Gerstein & April Blair	February 20, 2015	3J5456	1.21
Zoe and Wade learn that they're expecting a baby boy. This worries Zoe, who doesn't think she'll know how to raise an "Alabama boy." She enlists some of the Bluebell men to help her out. Magnolia has returned home with a new guy that Lemon disapproves of, so she asks Wade to help get rid of him. George and Annabeth show genuine interest in one another, though they are hesitant to go out due to possible lingering feelings for other people. Also, Bluebell is in contention to host an important football game, but must collaborate with rival Fillmore. This leads to Annabeth and Lavon reuniting for a night. Meanwhile, Brick runs into his estranged ex-wife who had abandoned the family long ago. He secretly meets up with her, but is spotted by Lemon.
73	7	"The Butterstick Tab"	Ricardo Mendez Matta	Amy Roy	February 27, 2015	3J5457	1.19
Brick tells Lemon about his encounter with Alice and she makes it clear that she doesn't want her mother back in her life. Things gets complicated with Alice shows up to Fancie's one day and reopens old wounds for Lemon. Meanwhile, Alice's daughter Scarlett is still hanging around Bluebell and only finds out about her two older sisters when she walks in on Lemon confronting Alice. In the end, Lemon and Magnolia haven't forgiven Alice, but are able to start a relationship with Scarlett. Zoe wants Wade to stop flirting his way through life, so he asks Lavon for help. Also, George and Annabeth plan their first date and insist on going to a place that doesn't drag up old memories for either of them, which ends up being hard to find in their small town.
74	8	"61 Candles"	Brandi Bradburn	April Blair & Tamar Laddy	March 6, 2015	3J5458	1.11
Zoe has her heart set on finding a family heirloom to pass onto her child. After Lemon and Lavon finally get back together, Wade and Lavon try to get their girls to become real friends, though the two only get into an argument over how to divide their time with Lavon. Meanwhile, it's Brick's birthday and everyone seems to have forgotten, as they're all busy filling in for Tom and Wanda's various duties while they're tending to their new baby. Also, George's parents are in town and he tries to hide his side job as a music manager from them.
75	9	"End of Days"	Tim Matheson	Adam Milch & Kendall Sand	March 20, 2015	3J5459	1.08
Annabeth has a dream in which Bluebell's founder, Cyrus Lavinius Jeremiah Jones, tells her that the world is ending. She passes the prophecy off to Crickett as a funny story, but rumors of an impending apocalypse start spreading like wildfire. Everyone starts making preparations for how they'd like to spend their last day on earth. Crickett, Lemon, and Annabeth go to great lengths to make amends with a girl that they used to bully in high school. Meanwhile, Wade is upset when he finds out that Zoe doesn't believe in marriage. She decides to give him some space and accompany George to Meatball's performance in New Orleans. George then runs into Pamela, who gives him a huge job offer in Nashville. Zoe ends up changing her mind about marriage and has George help her set up a proposal, but before she can show it to Wade, Lavon and Lemon stumble upon the display and Lemon assumes that Lavon is proposing to her. She says yes. Annabeth encourages George to take the job and the town bids him farewell.
76	10	"Bluebell"	David Paymer	Leila Gerstein	March 27, 2015	3J5460	1.33
Zoe and Wade are holding off on their own engagement in the aftermath of Lavon and Lemon's surprise engagement. Brick officially makes Zoe a partner at the medical practice. Meanwhile, the Breelands are trying to put together the perfect engagement party, but run into a few complications. During the party, Lavon finally tells Lemon the truth about the proposal and she leaves, while Zoe goes into labor. Annabeth also gets angry about George assuming that she'd eventually move to Nashville to be with him. She suggests that they break up. Lavon enlists Brick and George to help him plan a real proposal. Before he can do so, everyone meets up at the hospital to support Zoe and Wade, who then decide to get married as soon as possible. George tells Annabeth that he loves her and they agree to try to make it work. Not caring about the perfect moment, Lavon proposes to Lemon on the side of the road. Zoe and Wade say their vows on the way to the delivery room, welcoming their son into the world shortly after. In a musical flash-forward, Lemon and Lavon get married with the whole town present and George and Annabeth are shown settling down together.

== Casting ==
Erica Piccininni was cast as the new firefighter and love interest for Brandi Burkhardt's character, Crickett Watts. Dawson's Creek star Meredith Monroe was cast as Lemon's estranged mother, Alice Kincaid, and Talitha Bateman was cast as her daughter, Scarlett Kincaid.

== Cancellation ==
The third season saw the series begin a ratings decline, averaging a .6 in the 18-to-49 demo and 1.6 million viewers. Ratings rose in the fourth season, but was not enough to sustain a renewal.

Series creator Leila Gerstein later hinted to fans via Twitter that the series was unlikely to return for a fifth season, and the final episode of the season had the definite feel of being a series finale.

On the 29th of July, 2015, Rachel Bilson put to rest the rumours surrounding the cancellation of the series once and for all via her Instagram account.

Missing the #zoehart #hartofdixie days, especially this outfit and this lady. Just wanted to clear something up, the cancellation of HOD had nothing to do with me or my pregnancy. I loved my show and loved playing Zoe Hart, thanks to everyone who watched!

== Broadcast ==
Season four of Hart of Dixie premiered on The CW in the United States on December 15, 2014. The series moved to Fridays regular timeslot starting with the second episode. The CW's president said in January 2015, It is "not necessarily" Hart of Dixie's final season, Pedowitz said. With only the second episode of the current season airing this Friday, "We have to see the ratings." As for this season's last episode, he said, "If [Dixie] ends, it's a great series finale. And if it doesn't end, it's a great season finale."

== Reception ==
The season premiere was up from the previous season with 1.22 million people tuning in. The first episode had a 0.4 rating share for adults 18-49.

The series finale saw the highest ratings of the series since season two's episode 17 episode that aired in 2013. The series finale had 1.33 million people tune in with and audience share of 0.4 for adults 18-49.

Viewership and ratings per episode of Hart of Dixie season 4
No.	Title	Air date	Rating/share (18–49)	Viewers (millions)	DVR (18–49)	Total (18–49)
1	"Kablang"	December 15, 2014	0.4/1	1.22	0.3	0.7
2	"The Curling Iron"	January 16, 2015	0.4/2	1.14	0.3	0.7
3	"The Very Good Bagel"	January 23, 2015	0.5/2	1.22	—N/a	—N/a
4	"Red Dye #40"	January 30, 2015	0.3/1	1.02	0.4	0.7
5	"Bar-Be-Q Burritos"	February 6, 2015	0.5/2	1.24	—N/a	—N/a
6	"Alabama Boys"	February 20, 2015	0.4/2	1.21	0.4	0.8
7	"The Butterstick Tab"	February 27, 2015	0.4/2	1.19	0.3	0.7
8	"61 Candles"	March 6, 2015	0.4/2	1.11	0.4	0.8
9	"End of Days"	March 20, 2015	0.4/2	1.08	0.3	0.7
10	"Bluebell"	March 27, 2015	0.4/2	1.33	0.3	0.7

== Home Release ==
Hart of Dixie: The Fourth and Final Season was released on DVD in the U.S. on October 27, 2015. The 2 disc set includes all 10 episodes from the fourth and final season and various language and subtitle options.

The Fourth and Final Season
Set details			Special features
10 episodes; 410 minutes (Region 1); 405 (Region 2); 406 minutes (Region 4); 5-disc set; 1.78:1 aspect ratio; Languages: English (Dolby Digital 5.1); Subtitles: English, (Region 4)			No special features
Release Dates			No special features
United States	United Kingdom	Australia	No special features
October 13, 2015	October 12, 2015	October 14, 2015	No special features
