= Hart of Dixie season 1 =

Hart of Dixie
- Season 1
- DVD cover
- No. of episodes: 22

Release
- Original network: The CW
- Original release: September 26, 2011 – May 14, 2012

Season chronology
- Next → Season 2

The first season of Hart of Dixie an American television series, originally aired in the United States on The CW from September 26, 2011, through May 14, 2012. The season was produced by CBS Television Studios. The pilot, which was announced in February 2011, was ordered to series in May 2011. On October 12, 2011, The CW picked up Hart of Dixie for a full season which will consist of 22 episodes. On May 11, 2012, The CW renewed the show for a second season.

== Overview ==
The first season mostly revolves around Zoe adjusting to life in Bluebell and struggling to bring in 30% of the patients to her practice; a clause she needs to adhere to if she wishes to keep half from Brick. She finds this difficult as she is at odds with most of the local residents due to her city persona. Zoe also struggles with her growing feelings towards George Tucker, feelings of which his fiancée Lemon is fully aware, leading her to make it her mission to ensure Zoe leaves Bluebell. Other storylines include Wade's feelings for Zoe which may or may not be returned, Zoe's friendship with the mayor, Lavon, and his past with Lemon, and Zoe's unresolved issues regarding her family.

== Cast and characters ==
=== Regular ===
- Rachel Bilson as Dr. Zoe Hart
- Jaime King as Lemon Breeland
- Cress Williams as Lavon Hayes
- Wilson Bethel as Wade Kinsella
- Scott Porter as George Tucker
- Tim Matheson as Dr. Brick Breeland (Recurring episodes 1–14)

=== Recurring ===
- Nadine Velazquez as Didi Ruano
- Reginald VelJohnson as Dash DeWitt
- McKaley Miller as Rose Hattenbarger
- Claudia Lee as Magnolia Breeland
- Mircea Monroe as Tansy Truitt
- Brandi Burkhardt as Crickett Watts
- Kaitlyn Black as Annabeth Nass
- Eisa Davis as Addie Pickett
- Wes Brown as Dr. Judson Lyons
- Armelia McQueen as Shula Whitaker
- JoBeth Williams as Candice Hart
- John Marshall Jones as Wally Maynard
- Ross Philips as Tom Long
- Mallory Moye as Wanda Lewis
- Deborah S. Craig as Shelley Ng
- Steven M. Porter as Frank Moth
- Peter Mackenzie as Reverend Peter Mayfair
- Christopher Curry as Earl Kinsella
- John Eric Bentley as Sheriff Bill
- Kim Robillard as Sal
- Dawn Didawick as Old Lady
- Esther Scott as Delma Warner
- Nancy Travis as Emmeline Hattenbarger
- Ann Cusack as Annie Hattenbarger
- Mary Page Keller as Emily Chase
- Carla Renata as Susie
- Ilene Graff as Clora Tucker

=== Special guest star ===
- Justin Hartley as Jesse Kinsella
- Meredith Monroe as Alice Kincaid

== Episodes ==
No. overall	No. in season	Title	Directed by	Written by	Original release date	Prod. code	U.S. viewers (millions)
1	1	"Pilot"	Jason Ensler	Leila Gerstein	September 26, 2011	2J6191	1.88
Fast-talking New York doctor Zoe Hart, has her life all figured out until she is turned down for a prestigious fellowship she had been certain she would get. Desperate, she decides to finally accept the offer of a kindly stranger, Dr. Harley Wilkes (Nicholas Pryor), whom she met at her medical school graduation years earlier, and who had proposed she join his small medical practice in the small Mobile Bay town of Bluebell, Alabama. Upon arrival, Zoe learns that Dr. Wilkes died four months earlier and willed his half of the town's medical practice to her, which she must share with the resident doctor, Brick Breeland, who is not very eager to have her there. Zoe meets George Tucker, the town's lawyer and "golden boy", but makes an enemy out of Lemon Breeland, Dr. Breeland's conservative daughter. In her first medical case, Zoe must look after a very pregnant local woman who is trying to hide her pregnancy, and later must be her coach when she goes into labor.
2	2	"Parades & Pariahs"	Jason Ensler	Leila Gerstein	October 3, 2011	2J6152	1.75
Hoping it might help the residents of Bluebell accept her as one of their own, Zoe agrees to join Mayor Lavon Hayes on his float during the town's annual Founder's Day Parade, but accidentally crashing the float does not help her win over the stuffy Lemon Breeland and the rest of the residents of Bluebell. To make matters worse, George Tucker informs Zoe that contractually she needs to bring in thirty percent of the business or Dr. Brick Breeland will have the option to buy out her half of the medical practice. Also, Zoe deals with Lemon's visiting cousin, Betty, who is showing signs of the early onset of multiple sclerosis, but wants to keep her condition a secret.
3	3	"Gumbo & Glory"	Andrew McCarthy	David Babcock	October 10, 2011	2J6153	1.57
Zoe enters the annual Bluebell gumbo competition, hoping that people will start to accept her as one of them. One patient she sees was bitten by a snake, and in the process of finding out what kind of snake, Zoe gets bitten and can only use one of her hands. When she has a particularly challenging medical emergency, she needs help from Brick, who also benefits from her expertise in another attempt to oust her from his medical practice. Meanwhile, Lavon develops a crush on Zoe's new receptionist Didi.
4	4	"In Havoc & In Heat"	David Paymer	Rina Mimoun	October 17, 2011	2J6155	1.65
As Bluebell is hit by an intense heat wave, Zoe discovers that the hot weather makes everyone act differently, and with a lot less inhibition, it takes all of Zoe's strength to ignore her heat-induced attraction to Wade until it gets the best of her. Meanwhile, Lemon prepares for the arrival of George's family, determined to win them over, but her uptight emotions get the best of her when Lavon shows up to the same restaurant with his date, Didi. Note: On the DVD edition of season one, episodes 4 and 5 have been swapped. Episode 4 "In Havoc & In Heat" becomes episode 5, and "Faith & Infidelity" becomes episode 4 instead of the episode 5.
5	5	"Faith & Infidelity"	Ron Lagomarsino	Debra Fordham	October 24, 2011	2J6154	2.01
Zoe receives test results which say the town minister has syphilis. She tells his wife that he must have cheated, despite a 1% chance that he could have contracted it another way. Meanwhile, Lavon is asked to endorse an itching cream. Wade runs over an old drunk who Zoe learns is Wade's estranged father and George and Lemon argue over the town funds.
6	6	"The Undead & The Unsaid"	Tom Amandes	Donald Todd	November 7, 2011	2J6156	1.45
Zoe believes she is being stalked by a man who has been dead for over a year after running him over with her car. Zoe's mother (JoBeth Williams) returns to town wanting to settle their differences. Meanwhile, Lemon's younger sister, Magnolia (Claudia Lee), causes trouble within the Breeland household over her outgoing ways.
7	7	"The Crush & The Crossbow"	David Paymer	Leila Gerstein	November 14, 2011	2J6157	1.62
Zoe backs out on a date with Judson Lyons, a single veterinarian, and spends time with George after seeing a movie. Lemon and Lavon host a turtle race. Wade gets divorced from Tansy (Mircea Monroe), a woman with whom he has not had contact in years.
8	8	"Homecoming & Coming Home"	Jeremiah Chechik	Rina Mimoun	November 21, 2011	2J6158	1.77
Zoe recruits Gigi, her party planner friend from New York, to help her plan Bluebell's homecoming football party, but naturally it does not go as Zoe plans. Two of the high school quarterbacks may miss the homecoming game due to flu-like symptoms and Zoe must figure out what the ailment is. Meanwhile, Lemon helps George and Wade set up a prank on an old high school bully.
9	9	"The Pirate & The Practice"	Joe Lazarov	Debra Fordham	November 28, 2011	2J6159	1.90
Zoe plans on going back to New York for Thanksgiving to visit her mother until she learns that she needs a few more patients to keep her half of the practice with Brick. Meanwhile, George's parents scheme to have George and Lemon move out of Bluebell by giving George a lucrative job at a law firm in Montgomery as part of their continuing agenda to keep George and Lemon apart. Also, Lavon encourages Wade to express his feelings for Zoe.
10	10	"Hairdos & Holidays"	David Paymer	David Babcock	December 5, 2011	2J6160	1.81
It is Christmas time in Bluebell and Zoe encourages Rose (McKaley Miller) to enter the annual Miss Cinnamon Cider Beauty Pageant, competing against Lemon's younger sister, Magnolia Breeland, resuming the bitter rivalry between Zoe and Lemon. Meanwhile, George and Wade get arrested for illegally chopping down a tree to be the Christmas tree for Bluebell's town square. Lemon looks back on her relationship with her mother (guest star Meredith Monroe), who walked out on her family on Christmas Eve without a word or warning 12 years ago, which led to the start of Lemon's past relationship with Lavon.
11	11	"Hell's Belles"	Janice Cooke	Donald Todd	January 23, 2012	2J6161	1.23
Zoe discovers that the women in her family were once southern belles and decides to join Lemon's clique of belles to get more in touch with her family history. But Lemon is determined not to let Zoe join her group and instigates a brutal hazing on Zoe to break her spirits. Meanwhile, Lavon's dating life is continually ruined after his one bad date with dim-witted Didi (Nadine Velazquez), who is under the delusion that Lavon is in love with her and wants to marry her. Also, George tries to get Wade to stop his father from selling his property to a retail company.
12	12	"Mistress & Misunderstandings"	James Hayman	Beth Schwartz	January 30, 2012	2J6163	1.54
Zoe and fellow Blue Belle Annabeth are secret girlfriends... secret because Annabeth does not want Lemon to find out, which would ruin Annabeth's reputation since socializing with "people of lower class" is forbidden among the traditional residents, all of whom still resent Zoe's presence in town. Zoe's happy behavior makes the people of Bluebell suspicious and Wade mistakenly thinks she is having an affair with Judson, who shows up asking Zoe to reconcile with him. Meanwhile, Lemon is doing everything she can to become the new Memory Matron but with Zoe's help Annabeth gets the job. Eventually, Zoe is forced to take matters a little further with Judson, leaving Wade jealous and defeated.
13	13	"Sweetie Pies & Sweaty Palms"	Patrick Norris	Leila Gerstein	February 6, 2012	2J6162	1.52
It is time in Bluebell for the annual Valentine's Day Sweetie Pie Dance. George plans a romantic evening at the dance with Lemon, but his plan backfires as Lemon tries to set up her father, who still pines for his wife, with another woman, hoping it will help him move on. Zoe initially declines Judson's invitation to go to the dance after feeling they are rushing the resumption of their romance, but changes her mind when Wade manipulates both Judson and Zoe into going. Meanwhile, Lavon is shocked when he sees Didi with another man, who he later finds out is her ex-boyfriend. Lemon breaks down after the dance when her father comes home without his date. She tells her father to get over her mother as she is not coming back. She finally reveals that she indeed located her mother at Christmas time, and she is living in a nearby town under a new name and has a new husband and daughter. Also, Judson breaks up with Zoe as he sees the chemistry between her and Wade. Didi and Lavon make up, and Didi finds a photo of Lemon in Levon's desk.
14	14	"Aliens & Aliases"	Tom Amandes	Debra Fordham	February 13, 2012	2J6164	1.64
Lavon asks Zoe to help him figure out why Didi has been avoiding him, but once Zoe uncovers the shocking fact that Lavon used to be romantically involved with Lemon Breeland and still pines for her, Zoe is unsure what to do with the information. Meanwhile, Wade convinces Lemon to dress up as Joelle in order to convince Joelle's jealous ex-boyfriend that he did not actually see Wade and Joelle together. Also, George comes to Zoe for advice in determining whether there is a medical explanation for the behavior of one of his clients.
15	15	"Snowflakes & Soulmates"	Andy Wolk	David Babcock	February 20, 2012	2J6165	1.57
Zoe is thrilled to see snow fall for the first time in Bluebell, but the rest of the town is superstitious that it will bring bad luck. Meanwhile, Lavon's parents (Ernie Hudson and Valarie Pettiford) make an unexpected visit to Bluebell and Lavon thinks it is the perfect opportunity to introduce them to Didi, but the introduction does not exactly go according to plan, which prompts Wade to help Lavon out with his parents' predicament. Zoe tries to reach her estranged father living in Europe but learns that he has disappeared with no explanation. Elsewhere, Lemon and George make a big decision about their future when they decide to travel to Charleston, South Carolina to elope, but Magnolia as well as Brick learn about it and insist they tag along.
16	16	"Tributes & Triangles"	Joe Lazarov	Michelle Paradise	February 27, 2012	2J6166	1.41
George is named Bluebell's Man of the Year, making everyone happy, except Brick, who wanted the title for himself. As the town's mayor, Lavon is expected to host a cocktail party in George's honor, but this is a difficult situation for Lavon given his history with Lemon and his fear of public speaking. Zoe agrees to step in and help Lavon organize the party, but things take a turn for the disastrous when Zoe has to improvise a speech at the gathering and reveals her secret crush on George. Meanwhile, Magnolia begs Wade to write a song and perform it with her at the party as part of her agenda to get closer to him, as well as use it as an outlet for her rebellious nature just to spite Brick. George's father also arrives back in town after Zoe persuades George to contact him, but the visit leads to a downbeat outcome.
17	17	"Heart to Hart"	Tim Matheson	Rina Mimoun	April 9, 2012	2J6167	1.20
Zoe decides upon acting cold and aloof towards her father Dr. Ethan Hart (Gary Cole) when he arrives to operate on George's father, but this proves difficult as he seems glad to see her. Unfortunately, he seems to want a purely friendly relationship, while she still desires a father. Meanwhile, Lemon decides to befriend Zoe, believing it will prevent the exposure of her affair with Lavon. Elsewhere, Mr. Maynard (John Marshall Jones), the owner of the Rammer Jammer, has Shelley and Wade face off in a signature cocktail contest for the establishment's anniversary, with Wade finding his gift of making cocktails.
18	18	"Bachelorettes & Bullets"	Patrick Norris	Donald Todd	April 16, 2012	2J6168	1.37
George remembers seeing Lavon and Lemon kissing and asks for Zoe's advice, if it really happened. Zoe, already knowing the truth, lies about it to protect her friend Lavon. Due to a series of circumstances, George ends up on a hunting trip that doubles as his bachelor party, with both Wade and Lavon tagging along. During the trip, in tracking down a large bear, George confronts Lavon, who finally tells him the truth about his brief affair with Lemon while George was living in New York two years prior. Predictably, George takes the news very badly, later breaking off his engagement with Lemon as well as telling Zoe that they are no longer friends because she lied to him about Lemon and Lavon. Meanwhile, Magnolia plans Lemon's bachelorette party on a party bus, complete with a male stripper. Also, Zoe begins a romance with a patient named Jesse (Justin Hartley), later finding out that he is Wade's estranged brother.
19	19	"Destiny & Denial"	David Paymer	Leila Gerstein	April 23, 2012	2J6169	1.28
Zoe and Lemon try to apologize to George about keeping secrets from him, but see that he is in a very pleasant mood about the situation. George goes on a spontaneous trip to New Orleans and invites Zoe to join him, where they finally kiss. Meanwhile, Wade wakes up in the morning after a crazy night of drinking and begins to re-evaluate his relationship with his ex-wife Tansy. Scotty McCreery guest stars.
20	20	"The Race & the Relationship"	Ron Lagomarsino	Alex Katsnelson	April 30, 2012	2J6170	1.39
It is time for the annual Bluebell Battle competition. Wade signs himself up for the battle in hopes of winning a $5,000 cash prize and asks Zoe to be his teammate after Lavon injures his foot. Zoe agrees, but has an ulterior motive in hoping to get close to George. Frederick Dean finally asks Rose out on a date, which happens after Zoe convinces Rose's mother, Annie (Ann Cusack), to let them have it. George and Lemon meet with Reverend Mayfair to discuss their relationship issues, which leads to them competing in the Bluebell Battle.
21	21	"Disaster Drills & Departures"	Jeremiah Chechik	Donald Todd	May 7, 2012	2J6171	1.37
Zoe blames herself, and nearly everyone else in town does the same, when Rose is hospitalized with appendicitis and Zoe mistakes the symptoms as love sickness. After much encouragement from Lavon, Wade explores the idea of opening his own bar in Bluebell. Meanwhile, Lemon plans a romantic night for George, hoping to get their relationship (and wedding day) back on track. Zoe's father, Ethan, arrives back in Bluebell, which makes her consider leaving town for good.
22	22	"The Big Day"	Tim Matheson	Leila Gerstein	May 14, 2012	2J6172	1.60
George and Lemon's wedding day finally arrives, but a big thunderstorm suddenly rolls into Bluebell which puts everyone's lives at risk. Zoe, while doing an errand for Lavon, seeks shelter from the storm in a barn with Wade, leading to some awkward moments between both of them. Zoe and Wade finally give in to their emotions. But at the end, George walks away from his wedding and confesses his love for Zoe.

== Production ==
=== Development ===
In February 2011, it was announced Hart of Dixie was in development on The CW, was written by Leila Gerstein. In May 2011, Hart of Dixie officially picked up to series. On October 12, 2011, the series received a back nine order for a full season consist of 22 episodes. The show's executive producer Josh Schwartz, compared the show to The WB classics such as Felicity, Everwood and Gilmore Girls.

=== Casting ===
Rachel Bilson was cast as Zoe Hart, followed Wilson Bethel as Wade Kinsella, Zoe's "gorgeous bad-boy" neighbor in February. In March Jaime King as Lemon Breeland, Cress Williams as Lavon Hayes, and Scott Porter was later cast as good-looking lawyer George Tucker, a potential love-interest for Bilson's character.

== Broadcast ==
Season one of Hart of Dixie premiered on The CW in the United States on Monday September 26, 2011 at 9:00 pm, with the season five premiere of Gossip Girl as its lead-in.

== Reception ==
On the review aggregator Rotten Tomatoes the first season has an approval rating of 35% based on 17 reviews, with an average rating of 3.9/10. The site's critical consensus reads, "It's got a solid cast, but Hart of Dixie is unfortunately rife with paper-thin characters and illogical plotting."

== Home release ==
Hart of Dixie: The Complete First Season was released on DVD in the U.S. on October 2, 2012. The 5 disc set includes all 22 episodes from the first season, special features and various language and subtitle options.

The Complete First Season
Set details			Special features
22 episodes; 924 minutes (Region 1); TBA (Region 2); 920 minutes (Region 4); 6-disc set; 1.78:1 aspect ratio; Languages: English (Dolby Digital 5.1); Subtitles: English, (Region 4)			Deleted scenes; Gag reel; Straight From the "Hart of Dixie" Featurette
Release Dates			Deleted scenes; Gag reel; Straight From the "Hart of Dixie" Featurette
United States	United Kingdom	Australia	Deleted scenes; Gag reel; Straight From the "Hart of Dixie" Featurette
October 2, 2012	October 8, 2012	November 11, 2012	Deleted scenes; Gag reel; Straight From the "Hart of Dixie" Featurette
