= List of Hart of Dixie episodes =

Hart of Dixie is an American television comedy-drama series created by Leila Gerstein for The CW. The series stars Rachel Bilson as Dr. Zoe Hart, who aspires to be like her father and become a cardio-thoracic surgeon. After four years of residency at New York Hospital, Zoe does not get a fellowship and takes up an offer to move south to work in a small medical practice.

Hart of Dixie was picked up to series in May 2011, Hart of Dixie premiered on September 26, 2011, on The CW in the United States at 9:00 p.m. following on the sixth season premiere of Gossip Girl as its lead-in. On October 12, 2011, Hart of Dixie was picked up for a full season of 22 episodes. On May 11, 2012, The CW renewed the show for a second season, which premiered on October 2, 2012. Hart of Dixie was renewed for a third season on April 26, 2013, which premiered on October 7, 2013. Hart of Dixie was renewed for a fourth and final season on May 8, 2014, which premiered on December 15, 2014. Hart of Dixie was canceled after four seasons. During the course of the series, 76 episodes of Hart of Dixie aired over four seasons.

== Series overview ==
Season	Episodes	Originally released	
Season	Episodes	First released	Last released
1	22	September 26, 2011	May 14, 2012
2	22	October 2, 2012	May 7, 2013
3	22	October 7, 2013	May 16, 2014
4	10	December 15, 2014	March 27, 2015

== Episodes ==
=== Season 1 (2011–12) ===
No. overall	No. in season	Title	Directed by	Written by	Original release date	Prod. code	U.S. viewers (millions)
1	1	"Pilot"	Jason Ensler	Leila Gerstein	September 26, 2011	2J6191	1.88
2	2	"Parades & Pariahs"	Jason Ensler	Leila Gerstein	October 3, 2011	2J6152	1.75
3	3	"Gumbo & Glory"	Andrew McCarthy	David Babcock	October 10, 2011	2J6153	1.57
4	4	"In Havoc & In Heat"	David Paymer	Rina Mimoun	October 17, 2011	2J6155	1.65
5	5	"Faith & Infidelity"	Ron Lagomarsino	Debra Fordham	October 24, 2011	2J6154	2.01
6	6	"The Undead & The Unsaid"	Tom Amandes	Donald Todd	November 7, 2011	2J6156	1.45
7	7	"The Crush & The Crossbow"	David Paymer	Leila Gerstein	November 14, 2011	2J6157	1.62
8	8	"Homecoming & Coming Home"	Jeremiah Chechik	Rina Mimoun	November 21, 2011	2J6158	1.77
9	9	"The Pirate & The Practice"	Joe Lazarov	Debra Fordham	November 28, 2011	2J6159	1.90
10	10	"Hairdos & Holidays"	David Paymer	David Babcock	December 5, 2011	2J6160	1.81
11	11	"Hell's Belles"	Janice Cooke	Donald Todd	January 23, 2012	2J6161	1.23
12	12	"Mistress & Misunderstandings"	James Hayman	Beth Schwartz	January 30, 2012	2J6163	1.54
13	13	"Sweetie Pies & Sweaty Palms"	Patrick Norris	Leila Gerstein	February 6, 2012	2J6162	1.52
14	14	"Aliens & Aliases"	Tom Amandes	Debra Fordham	February 13, 2012	2J6164	1.64
15	15	"Snowflakes & Soulmates"	Andy Wolk	David Babcock	February 20, 2012	2J6165	1.57
16	16	"Tributes & Triangles"	Joe Lazarov	Michelle Paradise	February 27, 2012	2J6166	1.41
17	17	"Heart to Hart"	Tim Matheson	Rina Mimoun	April 9, 2012	2J6167	1.20
18	18	"Bachelorettes & Bullets"	Patrick Norris	Donald Todd	April 16, 2012	2J6168	1.37
19	19	"Destiny & Denial"	David Paymer	Leila Gerstein	April 23, 2012	2J6169	1.28
20	20	"The Race & the Relationship"	Ron Lagomarsino	Alex Katsnelson	April 30, 2012	2J6170	1.39
21	21	"Disaster Drills & Departures"	Jeremiah Chechik	Donald Todd	May 7, 2012	2J6171	1.37
22	22	"The Big Day"	Tim Matheson	Leila Gerstein	May 14, 2012	2J6172	1.60

=== Season 2 (2012–13) ===
No. overall	No. in season	Title	Directed by	Written by	Original release date	Prod. code	U.S. viewers (millions)
23	1	"I Fall to Pieces"	Tim Matheson	Leila Gerstein	October 2, 2012	2J7251	1.53
24	2	"Always on My Mind"	Anton Cropper	Carter Covington	October 9, 2012	2J7252	1.19
25	3	"If It Makes You Happy"	Elodie Keene	Alex Taub	October 16, 2012	2J7253	1.40
26	4	"Suspicious Minds"	John Stephens	Jamie Gorenberg	October 23, 2012	2J7254	1.32
27	5	"Walkin' After Midnight"	Joe Lazarov	Veronica Becker & Sarah Kucserka	October 30, 2012	2J7255	1.41
28	6	"I Walk the Line"	Tim Matheson	Donald Todd	November 13, 2012	2J7256	1.62
29	7	"Baby, Don't Get Hooked on Me"	Michael Schultz	Carter Covington	November 20, 2012	2J7257	1.23
30	8	"Achy Breaky Hearts"	Janice Cooke	Alex Taub	November 27, 2012	2J7258	1.39
31	9	"Sparks Fly"	Norman Buckley	Jamie Gorenberg	December 4, 2012	2J7259	1.60
32	10	"Blue Christmas"	Patrick Norris	Leila Gerstein	December 11, 2012	2J7260	1.41
33	11	"Old Alabama"	David Paymer	Veronica Becker & Sarah Kucserka	January 15, 2013	2J7261	1.37
34	12	"Islands In the Stream"	Joe Lazarov	Donald Todd	January 22, 2013	2J7262	1.45
35	13	"Lovesick Blues"	Ron Lagomarsino	Alex Taub	January 29, 2013	2J7263	1.32
36	14	"Take Me Home, Country Roads"	Jeremiah Chechik	Carter Covington	February 5, 2013	2J7264	1.44
37	15	"The Gambler"	Jim Hayman	Dan Steele	February 19, 2013	2J7265	1.37
38	16	"Where I Lead Me"	Kevin Mock	Leila Gerstein	February 26, 2013	2J7266	1.38
39	17	"We Are Never Ever Getting Back Together"	David Paymer	Jamie Gorenberg	March 5, 2013	2J7267	1.50
40	18	"Why Don't We Get Drunk?"	Rebecca Asher	Veronica Becker & Sarah Kucserka	April 9, 2013	2J7268	1.20
41	19	"This Kiss" "The Kiss"	Bethany Rooney	Leila Gerstein	April 16, 2013	2J7269	1.30
42	20	"If Tomorrow Never Comes"	Jim Hayman	Alex Taub	April 23, 2013	2J7270	1.10
43	21	"I'm Moving On"	Janice Cooke	Donald Todd	April 30, 2013	2J7271	1.20
44	22	"On the Road Again"	Tim Matheson	Leila Gerstein & Len Goldstein	May 7, 2013	2J7272	1.19

=== Season 3 (2013–14) ===
No. overall	No. in season	Title	Directed by	Written by	Original release date	Prod. code	U.S. viewers (millions)
45	1	"Who Says You Can't Go Home"	Bethany Rooney	Leila Gerstein	October 7, 2013	2J7651	1.03
46	2	"Friends in Low Places"	Elodie Keene	Sheila Lawrence	October 14, 2013	2J7652	1.06
47	3	"Take This Job and Shove It"	Jim Hayman	Alex Taub	October 21, 2013	2J7653	1.05
48	4	"Help Me Make It Through the Night"	Tim Matheson	Jamie Gorenberg	October 28, 2013	2J7654	1.05
49	5	"How Do You Like Me Now?"	David Paymer	Sarah Kucserka & Veronica West	November 4, 2013	2J7655	1.00
50	6	"Family Tradition"	Jim Hayman	Dan Steele	November 11, 2013	2J7656	1.11
51	7	"I Run To You"	Brandi Bradburn	Sheila Lawrence	November 18, 2013	2J7657	1.03
52	8	"Miracles"	David Paymer	Leila Gerstein	November 25, 2013	2J7658	1.01
53	9	"Something to Talk About"	Mary Lou Belli	Alex Taub	January 13, 2014	2J7659	1.19
54	10	"Star of the Show"	John Stephens	Kendall Sand	January 20, 2014	2J7660	1.00
55	11	"One More Last Chance"	Kevin Mock	Jamie Gorenberg	January 27, 2014	2J7661	1.16
56	12	"Should've Been a Cowboy"	Les Butler	Sarah Kucserka & Veronica West	February 3, 2014	2J7662	1.21
57	13	"Act Naturally"	Patrick Norris	Dan Steele	February 10, 2014	2J7663	1.03
58	14	"Here You Come Again"	Janice Cooke	Sheila Lawrence	March 21, 2014	2J7664	1.03
59	15	"Ring of Fire"	Kevin Mock	Alex Taub	March 28, 2014	2J7665	0.94
60	16	"Carrying Your Love with Me"	Tim Matheson	Leila Gerstein	April 4, 2014	2J7666	0.73
61	17	"A Good Run of Bad Luck"	Ricardo Mendez Matta	Sarah Kucserka & Veronica West	April 11, 2014	2J7667	0.81
62	18	"Back in the Saddle Again"	Rebecca Asher	Kendall Sand	April 18, 2014	2J7668	0.80
63	19	"A Better Man"	David Paymer	Jamie Gorenberg	April 25, 2014	2J7669	0.75
64	20	"Together Again"	Michael Schultz	Sheila Lawrence & Dan Steele	May 2, 2014	2J7670	0.66
65	21	"Stuck"	Mary Lou Belli	Alex Taub	May 9, 2014	2J7671	0.76
66	22	"Second Chance"	Bethany Rooney	Leila Gerstein	May 16, 2014	2J7672	0.88

=== Season 4 (2014–15) ===
No. overall	No. in season	Title	Directed by	Written by	Original release date	Prod. code	U.S. viewers (millions)
67	1	"Kablang"	David Paymer	Leila Gerstein	December 15, 2014	3J5451	1.22
68	2	"The Curling Iron"	Michael Schultz	April Blair	January 16, 2015	3J5452	1.14
69	3	"The Very Good Bagel"	Richard W. Abramitis	Kendall Sand	January 23, 2015	3J5453	1.22
70	4	"Red Dye #40"	Bethany Rooney	Tamar Laddy & Ari Posner	January 30, 2015	3J5454	1.02
71	5	"Bar-Be-Q Burritos"	Les Butler	Adam Milch	February 6, 2015	3J5455	1.24
72	6	"Alabama Boys"	Mary Lou Belli	Leila Gerstein & April Blair	February 20, 2015	3J5456	1.21
73	7	"The Butterstick Tab"	Ricardo Mendez Matta	Amy Roy	February 27, 2015	3J5457	1.19
74	8	"61 Candles"	Brandi Bradburn	April Blair & Tamar Laddy	March 6, 2015	3J5458	1.11
75	9	"End of Days"	Tim Matheson	Adam Milch & Kendall Sand	March 20, 2015	3J5459	1.08
76	10	"Bluebell"	David Paymer	Leila Gerstein	March 27, 2015	3J5460	1.33

== Ratings ==
Hart of Dixie : U.S. viewers per episode (millions)

Season	Episode number																						Average
Season	1	2	3	4	5	6	7	8	9	10	11	12	13	14	15	16	17	18	19	20	21	22	Average
1	1.88	1.75	1.57	1.65	2.01	1.45	1.62	1.77	1.90	1.81	1.23	1.54	1.52	1.64	1.57	1.41	1.20	1.37	1.28	1.39	1.37	1.60	1.57
2	1.53	1.19	1.40	1.32	1.41	1.62	1.23	1.39	1.60	1.41	1.37	1.45	1.32	1.44	1.37	1.38	1.50	1.20	1.30	1.10	1.20	1.19	1.36
3	1.03	1.06	1.05	1.05	1.00	1.11	1.03	1.01	1.19	1.00	1.16	1.21	1.03	1.03	0.94	0.73	0.81	0.80	0.75	0.66	0.76	0.88	0.97
4	1.22	1.14	1.22	1.02	1.24	1.21	1.19	1.11	1.08	1.33	–												1.18

Audience measurement performed by Nielsen Media Research
