= Nakia Burrise =

American actress

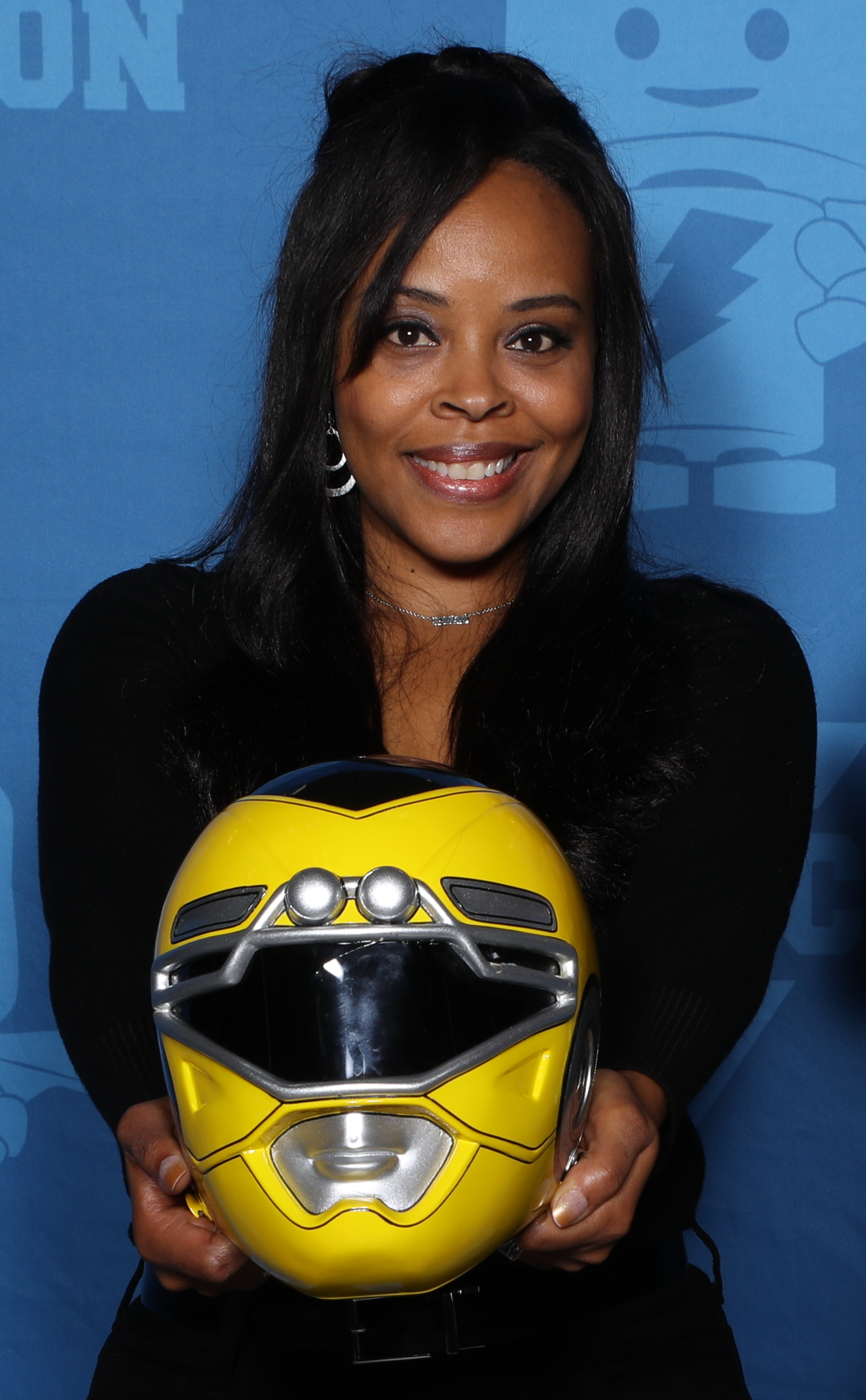
- Burrise at the Louisville Supercon in 2018
- Born: San Diego, California, U.S.
- Occupation: Actress
- Years active: 1996–present

Nakia Burrise is an American actress. She is best known for her role as Tanya Sloan, the Yellow Zeo Ranger and later, the first Yellow Turbo Ranger on the television series Power Rangers Zeo and Power Rangers Turbo from 1996 to 1997. She is also known for her recurring role as Joy on the UPN sitcom Moesha.

Since 2020, Burrise has had a recurring role on the Henry Danger spin-off Danger Force as Angela Macklin.

== Early life ==
Burrise was born in San Diego, California, the daughter of Deborah and Cornell Burrise. She fell in love with athletics at an early age, playing softball and running track.

After graduating from Thomas Alva Edison Senior High School in Stockton, California in 1992, she enrolled in the theater program at UCLA

== Career ==
In 1996, Burrise was cast as Tanya Sloan in Power Rangers Zeo. She later reprised her role in Power Rangers Turbo.

Between 2013 and 2015, she was recurring as Patty Pritchett in the famous series Hart of Dixie.

In 2017, she was cast in the short film The Order and had cast many Power Rangers alumni.

Since 2020, Burrise has had a recurring role as Angela Macklin on the Henry Danger spin-off Danger Force.

In 2026, Nakia Burrise played Professor Nunez in Paper Made, directed by Ryan Watson and filmed in Tampa, Florida. The film premiered at the AMC Westshore 14 on August 28th, 2026.

== Filmography ==
=== Film ===
Year	Title	Role	Notes
1997	Turbo: A Power Rangers Movie	Tanya Sloan/Yellow Turbo Ranger	
1997	Under Wraps	Paige	TV movie
1997	One of Us Tripped	Keisha	
1998	Jack Frost	Bank Customer	
1999	This Space Between Us	Backstage Interviewer	
2010	Barbie in A Mermaid Tale	Fallon Casey (voice)	Video
2010	Between Kings and Queens	Susan	
2012	Barbie in A Mermaid Tale 2	Fallon Casey (voice)	Video
2013	The Perfect Boyfriend	Lynda	TV movie
2016	Barbie: Dreamtopia	Nikki/Juniper/Amethyst (voice)	TV movie
2020	She's the One	Danita	
2020	Barbie: Princess Adventure	Principal Miller (voice)	Video
2021	Barbie & Chelsea: The Lost Birthday	Captain (voice)	Video
2022	For the Love of Christmas	Caryln Griffin	
2023	House Party	Lisa	
2026	Paper Made	Professor Nunez	

=== Television ===
Year	Title	Role	Notes
1996	Mighty Morphin Power Rangers	Tanya Sloan	Guest - 1 episode
1996	Power Rangers Zeo	Tanya Sloan/Yellow Zeo Ranger	Main Cast - 50 episodes
1997	Power Rangers Turbo	Tanya Sloan/Yellow Turbo Ranger	Main Cast - 19 episodes
1997	Smart Guy	Sarina	Guest - 1 episode "Book Smart"
1998	Born Free	Ngjensani	Episode: "Gift of Love"
1998–1999	Nash Bridges	Clerk/Candace	Episode: "Lady Killer" & "Superstition"
2000	Moesha	Joy	Recurring cast: season 5
2001	Sabrina the Teenage Witch	Female Patron	Episode: "Finally!"
2005	Boston Legal	Liz	Episode: "Legal Deficits"
2006	All of Us	Betty	Episode: "Pretty Woman"
2007	Samantha Who?	Dr. Kerry Hall	Episode: "Pilot"
2009	Bones	Wife	Episode: "The Foot in the Foreclosure"
2011	The Middle	Saleswoman	Episode: "The Bridge"
2011	Melissa & Joey	Erica	Episode: "Joe Versus the Reunion"
2012	90210	Airline Attendant	Episode: "Should Old Acquaintance Be Forgot?"
2012	Rules of Engagement	Saleswoman	Episode: "Audrey's Shower"
2013	New Girl	Beaming Woman	Episode: "Longest Night Ever"
2012–2015	Barbie: Life in the Dreamhouse	Nikki	Voice role; Main cast
2013–2015	Hart of Dixie	Patty Pritchett	Recurring cast: Seasons 3-4
2014	About a Boy	Mom	Episode: "About a Will-O-Ween"
2015	Star Trek Continues	Nakia	Episode: "The White Iris"
2015	Kevin from Work	Manager	Episode: "Team Kevin from Work"
2015–2017	Class Dismissed	Liz	Main cast
2016	Angie Tribeca	Mrs. Quigley	Episode: "Fleas Don't Kill Me"
2016	The Mindy Project	Alyssa	Episode: "Freedom Tower Women's Health"
2016	Murder in the First	Karen Green, Esq.	Episode: "Tropic of Cancer"
2017	Baby Daddy	Janet	Episode: "Pro and Con"
2017	Jane the Virgin	Female Executive	Episode: "Chapter Sixty"
2017	Rebel	Olivia Grant	Episode: "Conceal and Carry"
2017	Atypical	April	Episode: "The D-Train to Bone Town"
2017	The Mayor	Frank Woman	Episode: "The Strike"
2018	Unsolved	Sharon Gower	Episode: "Take Your Best Shot"
2019–2020	Barbie Dreamhouse Adventures	Principal Miller	Voice role; Recurring cast: season 3-5
2020–2024	Danger Force	Angela Macklin	Recurring cast
2021	Sydney to the Max	Nina	Episode: "The Hair Switch Project"

=== Web productions ===
- No Nerds Here (2012)

=== Video games ===
- Barbie Dreamhouse Party (2013)
- God of War: Ragnorök (2022)
