= The Outcasts (2017 film) =

2017 American teen comedy film

- Theatrical release poster
- Directed by: Peter Hutchings
- Written by: Dominique Ferrari; Suzanne Wrubel
- Produced by: Claude Dal Farra; Brice Dal Farra; Brian Keady
- Starring: Victoria Justice; Eden Sher; Ashley Rickards; Claudia Lee; Katie Chang; Peyton List; Jazmyn C. Richardson; Avan Jogia
- Cinematography: John Thomas
- Edited by: Jeffrey Wolf
- Music by: Spencer David Hutchings
- Production companies: Vision Films; Strategic Motion Ventures; BCDF Pictures
- Distributed by: Swen Releasing; Red Granite International
- Release date: April 14, 2017 (United States)
- Running time: 95 minutes
- Country: United States
- Language: English
- Box office: $24,197

The Outcasts is a 2017 American teen comedy film directed by Peter Hutchings. The film features an ensemble cast, starring Victoria Justice, Eden Sher, Ashley Rickards, Claudia Lee and Katie Chang. The plot follows a group of misfit teenagers who band together to overthrow the popular clique at their high school. Originally titled The Outskirts, filming took place between July and August 2014. The film was released in limited theaters and through video-on-demand on April 14, 2017, by Swen Releasing and Red Granite International.

== Plot ==
Best friends Mindy and Jodi have suffered years of torment under the thumb of the school's mean girls Whitney and Mackenzie. They plan to ride out their senior year under the radar, but when they become the victim of a humiliating prank, the two hatch a plan to unite the outcasts of the school and start a social revolution. They join forces with Dave, an affable slacker, Claire, a Girl Scout with a secret, and Virginia, an overachiever with dirt on everyone.

== Cast ==
- Victoria Justice as Jodi Schellenberger, a music nerd who is Mindy's best friend.
- Eden Sher as Mindy Lipschitz, a science nerd who is the brains of the revenge operation and is Jodi's best friend.
- Ashley Rickards as Virginia Vanderkamp, a depressed loner with money who helps Mindy and Jodi with their plan.
- Claudia Lee as Whitney Bennett, a ruthless and cruel popular girl who takes down anyone trying to be her equal. It is revealed that despite her claims of being rich, her parents are just servants in the mansion.
- Katie Chang as Claire Stewart, a Girl Scout who comes out as lesbian.
- Jazmyn C. Richardson as Dolores "Sugar" Jones, a young woman who is part of Mindy and Jodi's master plan, and also wants to stand up for black rights and women's rights.
- Peyton List as Mackenzie Smith, the youngest and closest of Whitney's friends. She dumps Whitney to hang out with Mindy.
- Avan Jogia as Dave Quinn, Jodi's boyfriend who used to be one of Whitney's minions.
- Harry Katzman as Louie Hammerschmidt, a fantasy nerd.
- Noah Robbins as Martin Vimmel, a sci-fi nerd.
- Alex Shimizu as Howard Chang, a tech nerd.
- Frank Whaley as Herb Schellenberger, Jodi's father.
- Brock Yurich as Kyle McDevitt, one of Whitney's popular friends.
- Daniel Eric Gold as Mr. Samuels, Mindy's teacher with whom she has a close friendship.
- Ted McGinley as Principal Whitmore, a torturous principal.
- Will Peltz as Colin Hackett, one of Whitney's popular friends.
- Jeanette Dilone as Paloma Watson, one of Whitney's popular friends.

== Production ==
On May 13, 2014, the cast of the film, originally titled The Outskirts, was announced to include Eden Sher, Avan Jogia, Claudia Lee, Victoria Justice, Ashley Rickards, Peyton List, Katie Chang and Will Peltz. On August 8, Frank Whaley joined the film to play Herb, the father of Jodi and a postal worker who agrees to start dating once his daughter takes charge of her own life. Victoria Justice and Avan Jogia starred together in the Nickelodeon movie Spectacular! and television show Victorious.

=== Filming ===
Principal photography began on July 2, 2014, in New York City. In August, filming occurred at John L. Miller Great Neck North High School and other locations around Great Neck and Port Washington.

== Marketing ==
On July 29, 2014, two images from the film were revealed by Entertainment Weekly. On May 14, 2015, the official poster was revealed through the cast members official social media accounts.

== Release ==
In March 2017, Swen Group acquired distribution rights to the film. On April 14, 2017, The Outcasts was given a limited release and made available through video-on-demand. On August 14, 2017, it was released on Netflix.

=== Critical response ===
On Rotten Tomatoes the film has an approval rating of 63% based on 8 reviews. On Metacritic, the film has a weighted average score of 47 out of 100 based on 4 critics, indicating "mixed or average reviews".
