= Matt Hobby =

American actor and comedian

- Hobby in 2012
- Occupations: Actor, comedian
- Years active: 2005–present
- Spouse: Mary Grill (m. 2011)
- Children: 2

Matt Hobby is an American actor and comedian known for portraying Pastor Jeff Difford in Young Sheldon and Georgie & Mandy's First Marriage, Philip in the HBO television series Boardwalk Empire, Rudy Truitt in Hart of Dixie and Pat Landy in The Grinder.

== Career ==
Matt Hobby began his acting career in 2008 when he played a character in the direct-to-DVD film The Cult of Sincerity.

He has appeared in television series such as Mom, Don't Trust the B— in Apartment 23, Onion SportsDome and Fresh Off the Boat. He appeared as Rudy Truitt in the drama series Hart of Dixie for ten episodes. He also played Philip, a servant (later butler) of the Thompson House, in the HBO series Boardwalk Empire.

Hobby played the role of Pastor Jeff Difford, a pastor of the church in the CBS television series Young Sheldon from 2017 to 2024. For the first two seasons, he was a recurring character, but he was promoted to the main cast starting with the third season. Hobby's real life wife, Mary Grill, portrays his character's new wife in the show.

In 2022, Matt started a podcast, Pay or Request, co-hosted with writer and comedian Joe Schiappa.

== Personal life ==
Hobby is married to actress Mary Grill. The couple have twin sons.

== Filmography ==
=== Film ===
Year	Title	Role	Notes
2008	The Cult of Sincerity	Bo	Direct-to-video
2011	DEC. 26	Elf	Short film
2013	Big City, Bright Lights		Short film
2013	Breakup at a Wedding	Alison's Male Best Friend	
2016	Spaghettiman	Pot Doctor	
2018	One Way Wolf Blitzer Freaky Friday	Isaac	Short film

=== Television ===
Year	Title	Role	Notes
2010	Diamonds Wow!	Mark Zuckerberg	Episode: "Zuckerberg's Facebook Apology"
2012	Boardwalk Empire	Thompson House Servant Philip	5 episodes
2013	Don't Trust the B— in Apartment 23	Host	Episode: "Dating Games"
2013–2015	Hart of Dixie	Rudy Truitt	10 episodes
2015	Highly Evolved Human	Doctor	Unknown episodes
2015	Mom	Chip	Episode: "Dropped Soap and a Big Guy on a Throne"
2015–2016	The Grinder	Pat Landy	5 episodes
2015	The Genderton Project		Television movie
2015	Skits-O-Frenic	Climber	Episode: "What the Duck?"
2017–2024	Young Sheldon	Pastor Jeff Difford	Recurring (Seasons 1–2); main role (Seasons 3–7); 45 episodes
2018	The Emperor's Newest Clothes	Tailor (voice)	Television short film
2019	Fresh Off the Boat	Kurt	Episode: "Cupid's Crossbow"
2019	Your Pretty Face Is Going to Hell	Carl Dugan	Episode: "Five-Card Duds"
2025	Georgie & Mandy's First Marriage	Pastor Jeff Difford	5 episodes
