= Scott Porter =

American actor (born 1979)

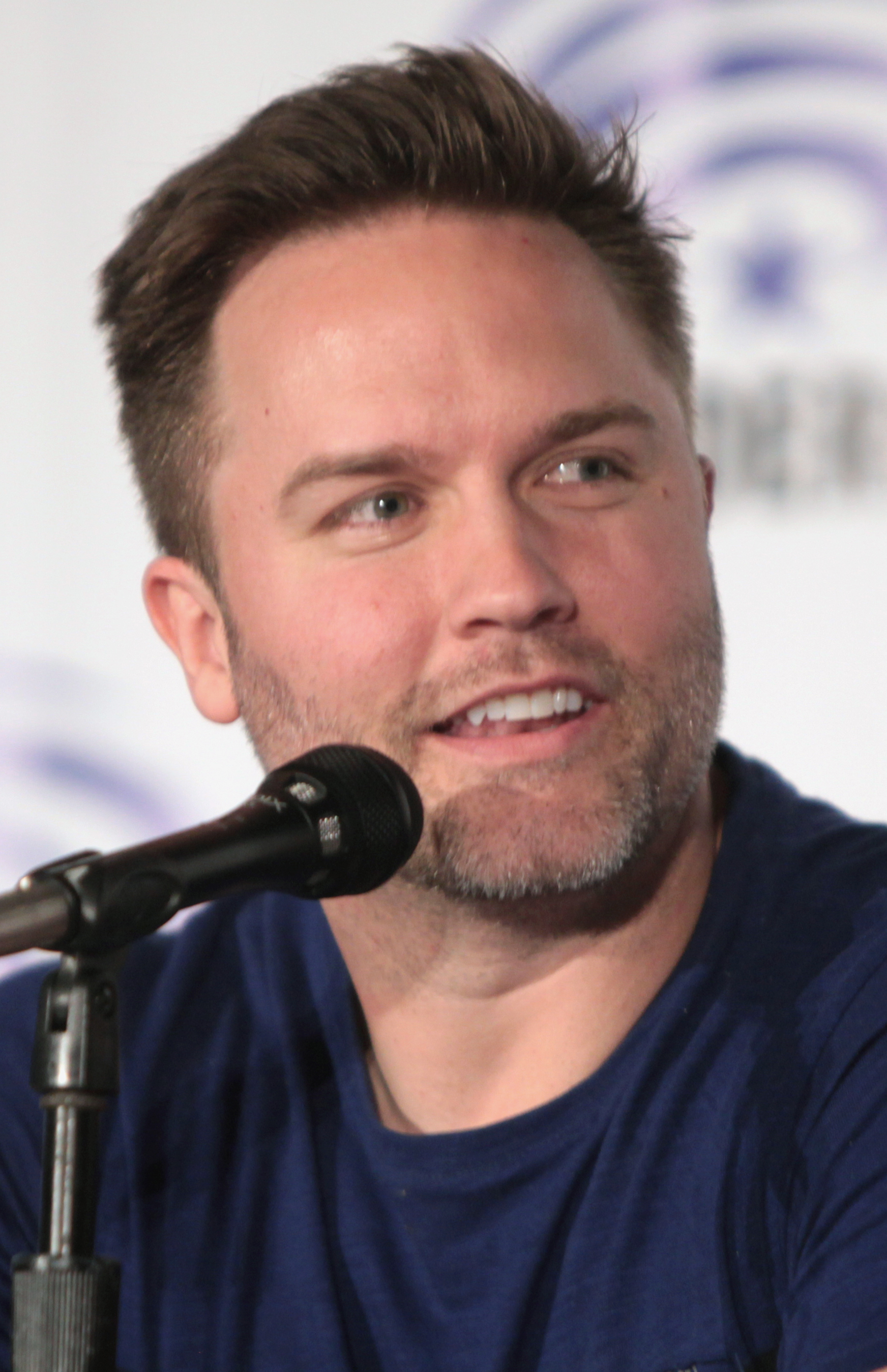
- Porter at the 2016 WonderCon
- Born: Matthew Scott Porter; July 14, 1979 (age 47); Omaha, Nebraska, U.S.
- Education: Lake Howell High School
- Occupation: Actor
- Years active: 2004–present
- Spouse: Kelsey Mayfield (m. 2013)
- Children: 2

Matthew Scott Porter (born July 14, 1979) is an American actor. He is best known for his role as Jason Street in the NBC television drama Friday Night Lights, as George Tucker in The CW comedy-drama series Hart of Dixie and as Mayor Paul Randolph in the Netflix series Ginny & Georgia.

Porter starred alongside Alyson Michalka and Vanessa Hudgens in the 2009 film Bandslam. He performed the song "Pretend", featured on the Bandslam soundtrack. In 2010, he played the role of law firm investigator Blake Calamar in CBS' legal drama The Good Wife.

Porter is also a voice actor, lending his voice to various projects based on comic books. These include Marvel Anime, Harley Quinn, Batman: Arkham Knight, The Walking Dead: Season Two, Guardians of the Galaxy: The Telltale Series, Marvel Ultimate Alliance 3: The Black Order, and Injustice 2.

== Background ==
Porter grew up in Winter Park, Florida, where he attended Lake Howell High School. He was a wide receiver on the football team at Lake Howell and graduated in 1997. While a student at the University of Central Florida, he sang vocal percussion in an a cappella vocal group, 4: 2: Five (currently known as VoicePlay). Porter also worked as a baby-sitter and "didn't have time to party."

== Career ==
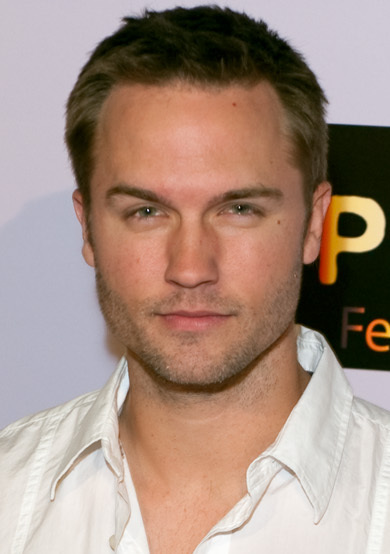
Porter at the Push premiere in January 2009

Prior to joining the cast of Friday Night Lights, Porter played Matthew in the original cast of the Off-Broadway hit Altar Boyz in 2004. In 2006, he temporarily took over the role of Casey Hughes in the soap opera As the World Turns, a role originally performed by Zach Roerig. Porter also played the role of Colin Thompson, the more visible part of the duo that fronts the fictional band PoP!, in the film Music and Lyrics (2007).

Porter also played the character Rex in the film Speed Racer (2008), which was directed and written by the Wachowskis. He played Bobby in the remake of Prom Night and Ben Wheatly in Bandslam, released in August 2009. That same year, he was paired with The Sisterhood of the Traveling Pants star Alexis Bledel in the romantic comedy film The Good Guy, which premiered at the Tribeca Film Festival.

Porter is a fan of comic books and has auditioned for several comic book hero roles. He is a fan of HeroClix, filming unboxing videos of upcoming sets for the WizKids Facebook page. Porter performed and sang the song "Someone to Fall Back On" in Bandslam, and his song "Pretend" was included in the soundtrack. He was part of his high school's choral department and was a founding member of the groups 4:2:Five (now known as VoicePlay) and Mosaic. He eventually performed for Off Broadway with another a cappella band, Toxic Audio.

Porter portrayed "Randy" in the 2010 film Dear John, which was adapted from the novel of the same name by Nicholas Sparks.

In 2010, Porter joined the cast of CBS's legal drama The Good Wife as Blake Calamar, an investigator for Lockhart & Gardner, a law firm. His character appeared in 14 episodes. Also in 2010, he starred in the pilot of the television series Nomads, which was developed for The CW, but it was not picked up by the network. BuddyTV ranked him #10 on its "TV's 100 Sexiest Men of 2010" list and #34 in 2011.

Porter played a lawyer in the medical dramedy series Hart of Dixie alongside Rachel Bilson (who also co-starred with him in The To Do List). The series debuted on The CW in September 2011.

In 2013, he debuted in the second season of the video game series of The Walking Dead by Telltale Games as Luke, one of the main characters in the series. Porter also voiced another main character, Lukas, in Minecraft Story Mode by Telltale Games and Mojang. In 2017, Porter portrayed Colton "Colt" Cruise in the EA Sports game Madden NFL 18's Longshot mode. In 2022, he also provided the voice for Heimdall, one of the main antagonists in Santa Monica studio's God of War: Ragnrarok.

In 2024, Porter competed in season eleven of The Masked Singer as "Gumball". He finished in second place, with Vanessa Hudgens as "Goldfish" winning the season.

== Personal life ==
In April 2013, Porter married Kelsey Mayfield, a casting director and former University of Texas cheerleader whom he met on the set of Friday Night Lights. One of his groomsmen was screenwriter and director Jamie Linden, a schoolmate at Lake Howell. In May 2015, Mayfield gave birth to their son, McCoy Lee. Their daughter, Clover Ash, was born in August 2017.

Porter is also known for playing and promoting HeroClix, a tabletop miniatures game featuring Marvel and DC Comics characters. He films preview videos of upcoming product releases and hosts "HeroClix for Huntington's", an annual charity tournament supporting the Huntington's Disease Society of America. Porter was also created as a 'bystander' token and two separate figures playable in the HeroClix game.

Porter is a big fan of Pokémon and plays Pokémon Go with his kids, sister, and father.

== Filmography ==
=== Film ===
Year	Title	Role	Notes
2007	Music and Lyrics	Colin Thompson	
2008	Speed Racer	Young Rex Racer	
2008	Speed Racer: Wonderful World of Racing	Rex Racer	Short film
2008	Prom Night	Bobby Jones	
2009	Bandslam	Ben Wheatly	
2009	The Good Guy	Tommy Fielding	
2010	Dear John	Randy	
2010	Hit Me	Keith	Short film
2011	10 Years	Scott	
2013	The To Do List	Rusty Waters	
2021	Taking the Reins	Luke Travers	

=== Television ===
Year	Title	Role	Notes
2006	As the World Turns	Casey Hughes	4 episodes
2006	The Bedford Diaries	Jason Miller	2 episodes
2006	Ugly Betty	Guy	Episode: "Pilot"
2006–2008; 2010	Friday Night Lights	Jason Street	42 episodes Main role (seasons 1–3); Special guest star (season 5)
2009, 2015	Robot Chicken	Giant Man, Racer X, Kimble	Voice, 2 episodes
2010	Caprica	Nestor Willow	Recurring; 8 episodes
2010–2011	The Good Wife	Blake Calamar	Recurring (season 2); 14 episodes
2011	Marvel Anime: Wolverine	Scott Summers / Cyclops	Voice, English dub
2011	Marvel Anime: X-Men	Scott Summers / Cyclops	Voice, English dub
2011–2015	Hart of Dixie	George Tucker	Lead role
2013	The Eric Andre Show	Himself	Season 2 episode 10
2015	Master Work	Sean Fetters	Television film
2015	Parenthood	Amber's Significant Other	Uncredited cameo Episode: "May God Bless and Keep You Always"
2016–2017	Ultimate Spider-Man	Ben Reilly / Scarlet Spider, Synth Spiders	Voice, main role (season 4)
2016	Rosewood	Detective Russ Hame	Episode: "Ballistics & BFFs"
2016	Scorpion	Timothy "Tim" Armstrong	13 episodes
2016	Outcast	Donald "Donnie" Hamel	2 episodes
2018	Law & Order: Special Victims Unit	Nick Hunter	1 episode
2018	Avengers Assemble	White Wolf	Voice, 6 episodes
2019	Charmed	Levi (Heaven's Vice)	1 episode
2019	Why Women Kill	Ralph Vlasin	2 episodes
2020	Harley Quinn	Flash	Voice, episode: "A Fight Worth Fighting For"
2020	Kipo and the Age of Wonderbeasts	Francis	Voice, 2 episodes
2021–present	Ginny & Georgia	Mayor Paul Randolph	Main role
2021	Lucifer	Carol Corbett	Season 5 guest; Season 6 recurring cast
2021	Taking the Reins	Luke	Television film (Hallmark)
2022	Spidey and His Amazing Friends	George Stacy	Voice
2023	Up Here	Orson	Recurring role
2024	The Masked Singer	Himself / Gumball	Season 11 runner-up
2024	Lego Marvel Avengers: Mission Demolition	Moon Knight, Iceman	Voice, Disney+ special

=== Video games ===
Year	Title	Role
2011	X-Men: Destiny	Adrian Luca
2013	Marvel Heroes	Cyclops
2013–2014	The Walking Dead: Season Two	Luke
2014	Lego Batman 3: Beyond Gotham	Aquaman, Superboy
2015	Batman: Arkham Knight	Nightwing
2015–2017	Minecraft: Story Mode	Lukas
2016	Lego Marvel's Avengers	Bucky Barnes / Winter Soldier
2017	Guardians of the Galaxy: The Telltale Series	Peter Quill / Star-Lord
2017	Injustice 2	Damian Wayne / Robin
2017	Madden NFL 18	Colt Cruise
2017	Marvel vs. Capcom: Infinite	Bucky Barnes / Winter Soldier
2018	Madden NFL 19	Colt Cruise
2018	Lego DC Super-Villains	Aquaman
2018	Spider-Man	Harry Osborn
2019	Marvel Ultimate Alliance 3: The Black Order	Peter Quill / Star-Lord, Scott Summers / Cyclops
2022	God of War Ragnarök	Heimdall
2022	Marvel's Avengers	Bucky Barnes / Winter Soldier
2023	Starfield	Other You (male)
2024	Suicide Squad: Kill the Justice League	Flash
2024	Marvel Rivals	Peter Quill / Star-Lord, Eddie Brock
2026	Marvel Tōkon: Fighting Souls	Peter Quill / Star-Lord

=== Theatre credits ===
Year	Title	Role	Notes
2005-2006	Altar Boyz	Matthew	Off-Broadway
2009	Heathers: The Musical	Jason Dean	Workshop
2019	The Last Five Years	Jamie Wellerstein	After Hours Theatre Company
