= Brandi Burkhardt =

American actress (born 1979)

- Born: Brandi Lynn Burkhardt; June 25, 1979 (age 47); Baltimore, Maryland, U.S.
- Occupation: Actress
- Years active: 1996–present

Brandi Lynn Burkhardt (born June 25, 1979) is an American theatre, television and film actress, and former Miss New York. She grew up in Pasadena, Maryland and lives in Los Angeles.

== Biography ==
Widely known for her breakout role on The CW's Hart of Dixie as Crickett Watts, and as Siren on the NBC daytime soap Passions, and as a Broadway darling having created and starred in many musicals on Broadway. Brandi is also a recording artist and songwriter about to release her first Pop EP.

=== Education ===
She attended New York University Tisch School of the Arts

=== Pageant contestant ===
Burkhardt first hit the small screen in 1997, when she competed in the Miss Teen USA pageant as Miss Maryland Teen USA. The National Pageant was won by Shelly Moore of Tennessee. She later moved to New York to attend New York University, where she won the Miss Manhattan pageant, the Miss New York pageant and competed for Miss America 2000. Burkhardt performed vocal talent at that pageant, singing "Take Me As I Am", which she would later record as Emma on the concept album for the film and national tour concert version of Jekyll & Hyde, Jekyll & Hyde: Resurrection.

=== Theatre and music ===
Burkhardt's first major credit was the Jekyll and Hyde: Resurrection Tour, in the starring role of Emma Carew. This version of Jekyll and Hyde was told in concert form. A new song, "If You Only Knew", was written for her by Leslie Bricusse and Frank Wildhorn, which is featured on the cast recording. She eventually left the tour after accepting a contract role on the daytime drama Passions on NBC. Her Broadway debut came when she was cast as Lucie Manette in the Broadway musical adaptation of A Tale of Two Cities, which opened for previews on August 19, 2008 at the Al Hirschfeld Theatre in New York and had an official opening of September 18, 2008. She was persuaded to audition for the show by star James Barbour, who was at a dinner meeting with her. The production announced on November 4 that it would be closing on November 16, but the producers announced on November 7 that due to poor ticket sales the following week, the production would close on November 9, 2008. She then immediately went into another show, and played Sophie Sheridan in the Broadway production of Mamma Mia. She began her run on January 27, 2009 replacing Allison Case. Burkhardt played her final performance on September 20, 2009 and was succeeded by Alyse Alan Louis.

Burkhardt was attached to several other projects. Most prominently, Wonderland: Alice's New Musical Adventure by Frank Wildhorn which was written expressly for Burkhardt. Though she was unable to play the role as a part of the original broadway cast, having been committed to Hart of Dixie, she premiered the song "Once More I Can See" at the Graz Theatre Festival as part of the "Frank Wildhorn & Friends" and her version of "Finding Wonderland" was used as the major commercial representation for the show. She was also an integral voice in the development of Bonnie & Clyde, Havana as a part of the workshops and demos, as well as for Rudolf - the Last Kiss as Mary Vetsera. She also created the role of Mercedes in The Count of Monte Cristo recordings, earning her a double platinum record for its European Release.

In addition, Brandi was attached to Bonnie & Clyde, having done readings of this as well, and also concept recordings of music from Don Black and Frank Wildhorn. The musical "Mary Shelley's Frankenstein" was written specifically for her, though the show has not had an official performance or recording yet. It is unknown the status of the project or if Burkhardt will star.

In 2019, Burkhardt played Maria in a production of The Sound of Music at Gateway Playhouse.

=== Film and television ===
After touring the country in the musical Jekyll and Hyde, with the Resurrection Cast in concert form, Burkhardt joined the cast of the NBC daytime drama Passions as the mysterious Siren, a mermaid now living on land. She is also seen in the film Confessions of a Shopaholic. In the summer of 2009, the musical A Tale of Two Cities filmed a concert version of the show which was seen in the winter months of '09 and '10 on select PBS stations. She reprised her role of Lucie Mannette. It has been released on DVD. She has also done many guest spots on hit television shows such as Mad Men, How I Met Your Mother, Boston Legal, Numb3rs, Brothers & Sisters, The Defenders, NCIS and The Glades.

Notably, from 2011 to 2015, Burkhardt was a regular castmate on the hit CW show Hart of Dixie playing Crickett Watts and a recurring character on Bravo's Odd Mom Out Piper Winchester.

Currently, Burkhardt is at work on her solo pop EP with some of the music industry's biggest names, and her latest single, Kiss Him Outta My Head has been well received by all. Burkhardt will also appear in the 2025 film Friendship alongside Paul Rudd and Tim Robinson. Burkhardt has plans to produce a feature film.

== Recordings ==
- 2006: Jekyll & Hyde: Resurrection Studio Cast Recording
- 2008: "Bonnie & Clyde" Demo Recording
- 2009: Count of Monte Cristo - The Musical Highlights Concept Album Recording
- 2010: "A Tale of Two Cities...the new musical" International Studio Cast Recording
- 2010: "A Tale of Two Cities...the new musical" PBS Concert DVD
