= Kaitlyn Black =

American actress

- Born: July 29, 1983 (age 42)
- Occupation: Actress
- Years active: 2006–present

Kaitlyn Black (born July 29, 1983) is an American actress known for her role as Annabeth Nass in The CW comedy-drama series Hart of Dixie.

== Life and career ==
Black grew up in Copley, Ohio and graduated from Revere High School in Richfield, Ohio in 2001. She graduated magna cum laude from Kent State University in 2005 with a Bachelor of Arts degree in Theater. She has been acting since the sixth grade in musical and other theater and began dancing before that in jazz, tap and ballet.

Black played a southern belle in the medical dramedy series Hart of Dixie alongside Rachel Bilson. The series debuted on The CW in September 2011.

Kaitlyn Black is now starring off-Broadway in the improv musical #DateMe: An okcupid experiment that ran for three years at Second City and other venues in Chicago.

Kaitlyn later got her nursing license in 2024 in the state of Ohio.

== Filmography ==
Year	Title	Role	Notes
2006	Floaters	Erika Appleton	3 episodes
2008	Foreign Exchange	New Girl	Film
2009	Bureaucracy	Patricia	Film
2009	Cold Case	Betty Joe Henders '44	1 episode
2011	Traffic Light	Cashier	1 episode
2011	Raising Hope	Zoe	2 episodes
2011	How to Be a Gentleman	Tabitha	1 episode
2011	Enlightened	Halley	1 episode
2011	Hollywoo	Hôtesse VIP Room	
2011–2015	Hart of Dixie	Annabeth Nass	Recurring, seasons 1-2; series regular, season 3-4
2013	Officer Downe	Olivia	Film
2016	NCIS: New Orleans	Judy Brown	1 episode
2017	Babynapped	Kristin	TV Film
2018	Killer Single Dad	Jennifer	TV film
2018	NCIS	Lt. Melissa Newhall	1 episode
