= Claudia Lee =

American actress

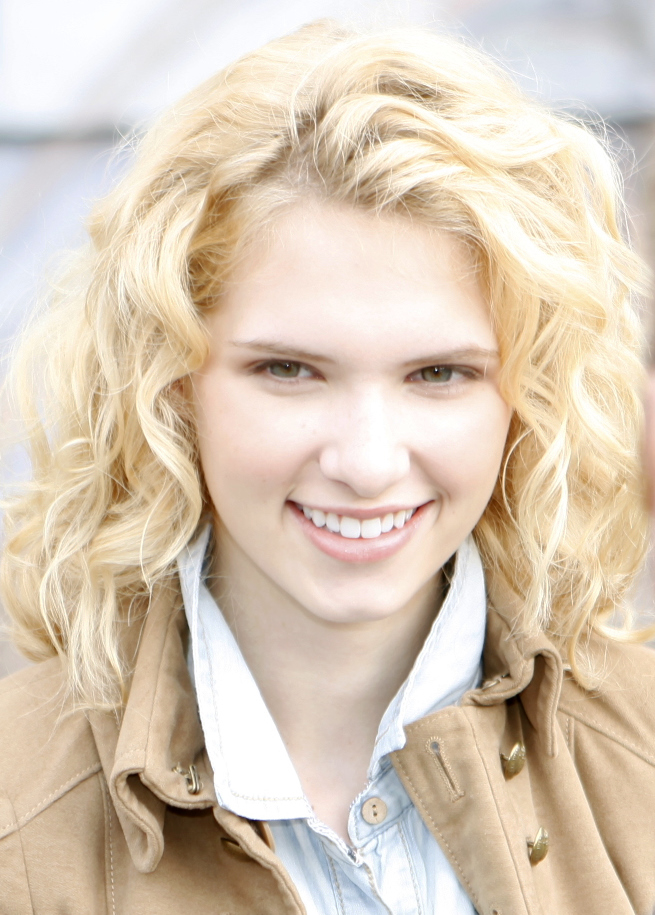
- Claudia Lee in 2011
- Born: Claudia Lee Mirkowski; Lafayette, Indiana, U.S.
- Occupations: Actress; singer
- Years active: 2009–present

Claudia Lee (born Claudia Lee Mirkowski) is an American actress and singer who is best known for her roles as Magnolia Breeland on Hart of Dixie, as Bridget on Zeke and Luther, and as Whitney in The Outcasts.

== Early life ==
Lee was born Claudia Lee Mirkowski on June 20, 1996, in Lafayette, Indiana. Claudia is fluent in Polish.

== Career ==
=== Acting ===
Lee and her family arrived in Hollywood in January 2010. Within her first few weeks, Lee landed a role in a national TV commercial for Comcast with actor Zachary Levi (Chuck, Less Than Perfect). She was then cast in a short film, The Circus Girl, as Elizaveta, a young Russian villain who is traveling with a struggling circus family.

Following The Circus Girl, Lee went on to television series Zeke and Luther and Hart of Dixie. In August 2012, Lee was cast in the Universal Studios film Kick-Ass 2, which was based on the second volume of the Kick-Ass comic book series by Mark Millar and John Romita, Jr. The film, directed by Jeff Wadlow, was released in August 2013.

In 2014, Lee appeared in the Fox comedy series Surviving Jack.

=== Singing ===
In 2010 Lee began working with music producer Max DiCarlo. In November of that year, Lee released her first song and music video, "It Gets Better", inspired by a national campaign aimed at stopping bullying. Lee's debut album, Here Right Now, was released in February 2012. "Hollywood Sunset", a song on the album, had previously been released in September 2011. The next two singles from the album, the country-rap song "3 Leaf Clover", and "Take My Hand" that Lee performed on Hart of Dixie, were released in 2012.

== Filmography ==
Film roles
Year	Title	Role	Notes
2010	The Circus Girl	Elizaveta	Short film
2013	Kick-Ass 2	Brooke	
2015	The Girl in the Photographs	Colleen	
2017	The Outcasts	Whitney	
2018	Haunting on Fraternity Row	Liza	
2021	Wild Indian	Rebecca	
2021	Send It!	Sky	

Television roles
Year	Title	Role	Notes
2011	Zeke and Luther	Bridget	4 episodes
2011–2015	Hart of Dixie	Magnolia Breeland	Recurring role, 29 episodes
2014	Surviving Jack	Rachel	Recurring role, 7 episodes
2016	Girl Meets World	Francesca	Episodes: "Girl Meets High School: Parts One and Two"
2018	Famous in Love	Billy	Recurring role (season 2)
