= Leila Gerstein =

American television producer and screenwriter

Leila Gerstein is an American television producer and screenwriter.

Gerstein has written for television shows, including Gossip Girl, The O.C. and Life As We Know It, and written and produced episodes of Eli Stone. She created the 2011 comedy-drama series Hart of Dixie. Gerstein won a 2017 Emmy as a consulting producer on The Handmaid's Tale.

== Biography ==
Gerstein was raised on the Upper East Side of Manhattan, where she attended Hunter College High School. After college, she attended theatre school while working as a SAT tutor and writing in her spare time. After getting several plays produced, she moved to Los Angeles. A personal essay that she read aloud at an Upright Citizens Brigade performance about her love affair with New York Mets third baseman Robin Ventura brought her notice from the Oxygen channel who hired her to write a pilot based on the story as well as two TV movies including Tempting Adam. She wrote scripts for Life As We Know It and The O.C., and then produced Eli Stone and Gossip Girl. Gerstein won a 2017 Emmy as a consulting producer on The Handmaid's Tale.

== Hart of Dixie ==
In February 2011, The CW ordered the pilot for Gerstein's Hart of Dixie and on May 17, 2011 officially picked up the series for the 2011–2012 season. The show is about a New York City doctor named Zoe Hart who inherits a medical practice in a small Southern town inhabited by an eclectic and eccentric group of characters. It was penned by Gerstein and is executive produced by Stephanie Savage, Josh Schwartz and Len Goldstein through Fake Empire production company.

On February 2, 2011, Jason Ensler was booked to direct the pilot. On February 15, 2011, Rachel Bilson signed on to play Zoe Hart, the main character.

Hart of Dixie premiered on September 26, 2011. The CW renewed the series for a second season on May 11, 2012, for a third on April 26, 2013, and for a fourth on May 8, 2014. Hart of Dixie was cancelled following the finish of season 4.

== Personal life ==
She is married to author and podcaster Nate DiMeo.

== Writing Credits ==
=== Life As We Know It ===
- "A Little Problem" (Season 1 Episode 9)

=== Tempting Adam ===
- Tempting Adam (TV movie, 2004)

=== The O.C. ===
- The Sister Act (S03E12)
- The Day After Tomorrow (S03E20)
- The Metamorphosis (S04E04)
- The Dream Lover (S04E11)

=== Eli Stone ===
- One More Try (S01E05)
- I Want Your Sex (S01E09)
- Grace (S02E02)
- Unwritten (S02E03)
- Owner of a Lonely Heart (S02E08)
- Mortal Combat (S02E11)

=== Gossip Girl ===
- Southern Gentlemen Prefer Blondes (S02E22)
- Rufus Getting Married (S03E05)
- The Last Days of Disco Stick (S03E10)
- The Sixteen Year Old Virgin (S03E15)
- Touch of Eva (S04E04)
- Damien Darko (S04E13)
- The Princesses and the Frog (S04E20)

=== Hart of Dixie ===
- Pilot (S01E01)
- Parades & Pariahs (S01E02)
- The Crush & The Crossbow (S01E07)
- Sweetie Pies & Sweaty Palms (S01E13)
- Destiny & Denial (S01E19)
- The Big Day (S01E22)
- I Fall to Pieces (S02E01)
- Blue Christmas (S02E10)
- Where I Lead Me (S02E16)
- This Kiss (S02E19)
- On the Road Again (S02E22) (with Len Goldstein)
- Who Says You Can't Go Home? (S03E01)
- Miracles (S03E08)
- Carrying Your Love with Me (S03E16)
- Second Chance (S03E22)
- Kablang (S04E01)
- Alabama Boys (S04E06) (with April Blair)
- Bluebell (S04E10)

=== The Handmaid's Tale ===
- Nolite Te Bastardes Carborundorum (S01E04)

=== Claws ===
- Self-Portrait (S01E06)

=== Looking for Alaska ===
- I'll Show You That It Won't Shoot (S01E05)
