= Hart of Dixie =

American comedy-drama television series

- Genre: Comedy drama
- Created by: Leila Gerstein
- Starring: Rachel Bilson; Jaime King; Cress Williams; Wilson Bethel; Scott Porter; Tim Matheson; Kaitlyn Black
- Composer: Jeremy Adelman
- Country of origin: United States
- Original language: English
- No. of seasons: 4
- No. of episodes: 76 (list of episodes)

Production
- Executive producers: Leila Gerstein; Donald Todd; Josh Schwartz; Stephanie Savage; Jason Ensler; Len Goldstein
- Producers: Sarah Kucserka; Kelly Van Horn; Veronica Becker; David Paymer; Ari Posner
- Cinematography: Jeffrey Jur; Buzz Feitshans IV; Robert Gantz; Brad Lipson; Larry Reibman
- Editors: Brandi Bradburn; Barbara Gerard; Les Bulter; Jeff Granzow; Benjamin Bumgartner; Luke Pebler
- Running time: 42 minutes
- Production companies: Fake Empire; Dogarooski Productions (season 4); CBS Television Studios; Bonanza Productions; Warner Bros. Television

Original release
- Network: The CW
- Release: September 26, 2011 – March 27, 2015

Hart of Dixie is an American comedy-drama television series created by Leila Gerstein which aired on The CW from September 26, 2011 to March 27, 2015.

The series stars Rachel Bilson as Dr. Zoe Hart, a doctor from New York who, after her dream of becoming a heart surgeon falls apart, accepts an offer to work as a general practitioner in the fictional Gulf Coast town of Bluebell, Alabama.

== Plot ==
=== Season 1 ===
The first season revolves around Zoe Hart adjusting to life in the small town of Bluebell, Alabama, after failing to secure a fellowship in New York because of her poor bedside manner. She has inherited half of the practice from a father she never knew, with whom Zoe's mother had an affair while engaged to the man Zoe knew as her dad. To keep her half of the inherited practice she must bring in 30% of the patients, which she finds difficult as she is at odds with most of the local residents due to her city persona. Zoe also struggles with her growing feelings for local attorney George Tucker, feelings of which his fiancée, Lemon Breeland, is suspicious, leading Lemon to make it her mission to ensure Zoe leaves Bluebell. Other storylines include neighbor Wade's feelings for Zoe, which may or may not be returned; Zoe's friendship with the mayor, Lavon Hayes, and his past with Lemon; and Zoe's unresolved issues regarding her family.

=== Season 2 ===
The season begins with Zoe confused with her feelings for both George and Wade, as she slept with Wade the night of George and Lemon's aborted wedding at the end of season one. She later decides that George is not ready for another relationship yet and decides to see Wade. Lavon's former high school sweetheart Ruby Jeffries (Golden Brooks) returns to Bluebell and reveals she is opposing him for mayor. George begins dating again, first seeing newcomer Shelby Sinclair. However, he later dumps her, and Shelby begins dating Brick Breeland, father of Lemon Breeland. George later starts a relationship with Wade's ex-wife, Tansy Truitt. As the season progresses, Ruby leaves after Lemon's jealousy destroys her and Lavon. Wade and Zoe continue to date, though they face their share of setbacks. At the end of the season, Zoe is faced deciding between a summer in New York working at a hospital at her dream job, only to have Wade confess his feelings for her, which she is unable to return. Meanwhile, Annabeth begins having feelings for Lavon, and later the two sleep together, leaving Lemon devastated by her best friend's betrayal.

=== Season 3 ===
The season begins with Zoe returning to Bluebell after a summer in NYC, along with her new boyfriend Joel. George struggles to rebuild his life following his breakup with Tansy but finds love with Lavon's younger cousin. Lemon finds herself in a scandalous relationship, while Annabeth hopes her relationship with Lavon will grow into something more. Zoe learns more about her family roots in Bluebell, breaks up with Joel, and reunites with Wade.

=== Season 4 ===
The final season deals with Zoe's pregnancy and her relationship with Wade. George, Lemon, Lavon, and Annabeth enter a tumultuous love affair, while Brick has to deal with his past in order to move forward as Lemon and Magnolia meet their half-sister from their estranged mother who left the family. In the end, George and Annabeth move in together, George changes careers to become a music manager and Lemon and Lavon get married as well Zoe and Wade, who however recite their vows while rushing towards the delivery room due to Zoe having gone into labor, after which she gives birth to a baby boy.

The final scene shows the town in harmony in the town square, Wade and Zoe with their son. An old love triangle is re-fueled among three elderly members of the community. Zoe asks if all small towns are like Bluebell, to which Wade answers that they probably are not. Zoe agrees, and they get up to walk their son and join their friends.

== Cast and characters ==
- Rachel Bilson as Zoe Hart, a medical doctor who moves from New York to a small town in Alabama called Bluebell
- Jaime King as Lemon Breeland, the elder daughter of town physician, Bertram "Brick" Breeland, and young president of the Bluebell Belles Association
- Cress Williams as Lavon Hayes, Mayor and Co-Chair of the Tourism Council of Bluebell and former NFL linebacker
- Wilson Bethel as Wade Kinsella, Zoe's neighbor who works as a bartender
- Scott Porter as George Tucker, a local lawyer in Bluebell who is the long term fiancé of Lemon
- Tim Matheson as Bertram "Brick" Breeland, Bluebell's local medical practitioner
- Kaitlyn Black as Annabeth Nass (seasons 3–4; recurring seasons 1–2), a member of the Belles association and Lemon's friend

== Episodes ==
Season	Episodes	Originally released	
Season	Episodes	First released	Last released
1	22	September 26, 2011	May 14, 2012
2	22	October 2, 2012	May 7, 2013
3	22	October 7, 2013	May 16, 2014
4	10	December 15, 2014	March 27, 2015

== Production ==
=== Development ===
On February 1, 2011, it was announced that The CW had ordered a pilot for Hart of Dixie. On May 17, 2011, the network officially picked up Hart of Dixie to series, set to air in fall 2011. The series marks the second time executive producer Josh Schwartz and series star Rachel Bilson have worked together on television. The first time the duo worked together was on the Fox teen drama The O.C., created by Schwartz. The show's executive producer, Josh Schwartz, compared the show to Felicity, Everwood, and Gilmore Girls.

On October 12, 2011, the series was picked up for a full season, which would consist of twenty-two episodes. Along with pick-up for all other CW dramas, Mark Pedowitz said "We believe in the creative strength of these dramas, and by giving them back nine orders we can give our audience the chance to enjoy complete seasons of all three of them." On May 11, 2012, The CW renewed the series for a second season. The CW renewed the series for a third season on April 26, 2013 and for a fourth season on May 8, 2014. On July 18, 2014, The CW president Mark Pedowitz announced that the fourth season would consist of ten episodes. On March 14, 2015, Leila Gerstein revealed that the fourth season would be the last. The CW officially canceled the series on May 7, 2015.

=== Casting ===
On February 8, 2011, TVLine reported that Rachel Bilson was nearing a deal to star in the series. Her role was later confirmed by The CW in a press release. Soon after, Wilson Bethel joined the cast as Wade Kinsella, Zoe's "gorgeous bad-boy" neighbor. Scott Porter was cast as good-looking lawyer George Tucker, a potential love-interest for Bilson's character.

On May 20, 2011, it was announced that Nancy Travis would not continue with the series due to her commitments with the 20th Century Fox-produced sitcom Last Man Standing. Travis was written out after the first two episodes. Meredith Monroe appeared in one episode as Lemon's estranged mother. JoBeth Williams appeared in three episodes as Candice Hart, the mother of Bilson's character. On July 26, 2013, it was announced that Kaitlyn Black was upgraded to series regular status for season three.

== Release ==
=== Broadcast ===
With the reveal of The CW's fall 2011 schedule, it was announced that Hart of Dixie would air on Monday at 9:00 pm Eastern/8:00 pm Central, following Gossip Girl. It premiered on Monday, September 26, 2011. The season season premiered on October 2, 2012. The third season premiered on October 7, 2013. The fourth and final season premiered on December 15, 2014.

=== Home media ===
The first season was released on DVD in the U.S. on October 2, 2012, with the 5 disc set including all 22 episodes from the season, special features and various language and subtitle options. The season season was released on DVD in the U.S. on October 15, 2013, with the 5 disc set including all 22 episodes from the season and various language and subtitle options. The third season was released on DVD in the US on March 15, 2015, with the 5 disc set including all 22 episodes from the season and various language and subtitle options. The fourth and final season was released on DVD in the U.S. on October 27, 2015, with the 2 disc set including all 10 episodes from the fourth and final season and various language and subtitle options.

== Reception ==
=== Ratings ===
Season	Timeslot (ET)	No. of episodes	Premiered		Ended		TV season	Rank	Viewers (in millions)
Season	Timeslot (ET)	No. of episodes	Date	Premiere viewers (in millions)	Date	Finale viewers (in millions)	TV season	Rank	Viewers (in millions)
1	Monday 9:00 pm	22	September 26, 2011	1.88	May 14, 2012	1.60	2011–2012	#182	1.77
2	Tuesday 8:00 pm	22	October 2, 2012	1.53	May 7, 2013	1.19	2012–2013	#142	1.70
3	Monday 8:00 pm (2013–2014) (1–13); Friday 9:00 pm (2014) (14–22)	22	October 7, 2013	1.03	May 16, 2014	0.88	2013–2014	#166	1.37
4	Monday 8:00 pm (2014) (1); Friday 8:00 pm (2015) (2–10)	10	December 15, 2014	1.22	March 27, 2015	1.33	2014–2015	#175	1.61

=== Critical response ===
Hart of Dixie's first season received mixed reviews, scoring a 43 out of 100 on the review aggregator Metacritic.

TVGuide.com described the show as "Southern Exposure" and, in a later review, stated that the actors are better than the "cutesy" material, although Bilson is not convincing as a heart surgeon. Both TVGuide.com and Robert Bianco of USA Today stated that the show is potentially offensive to the South. Bianco also wrote that the show is shallow and far-fetched, with Bilson giving an unconvincing performance, such as acting surprised when calling herself a doctor. Tim Goodman of The Hollywood Reporter stated that the series is predictable and superficial, but "surprisingly touching".

Writing for The New York Times, critic Neil Genzlinger wrote "the premiere, at least, doesn't find a convincing way to balance the clashing strands: the city-mouse disorientation, the medical emergencies, the girlfights, the daddy issues, the young-pretty-and-available stuff." Los Angeles Times reviewer Mary McNamara described the show as "a stack of familiar scenarios stitched together to form a pretty if not terribly substantial quilt." TVLine described the show as "Everwood-esque". TVLine later stated: "Beautifully filmed with warm, cozy tones, the Southern setting utterly envelops the glowing Bilson", adding that Porter's appearance "wins us over and makes you forget that clunky intro" and despite the "rom-coms clichés, the pilot is super-efficient at introducing us to those who will be the key players in Zoe's story, laying the framework for storytelling places to go." TV Times magazine gave Hart of Dixie its lowest score of 2011–2012: 12 out of 100.

=== Awards and accolades ===
Year	Award	Category	Recipients and nominees	Outcome
2011	E! Golden Tater Awards	New Fall Show You're Most Excited For	Hart of Dixie	Nominated
2012	People's Choice Awards	Favorite New TV Drama	Hart of Dixie	Nominated
2012	ASCAP Award	Top Television Series (Composers and Songwriters)	Jeremy Adelman	Won
2013	ASTRA Awards	Favourite Program – International Drama	Hart of Dixie	Nominated
2014	ASTRA Awards	Favourite Program – International Drama	Hart of Dixie	Nominated
2014	Teen Choice Awards	Choice TV Show: Drama	Hart of Dixie	Nominated
2014	Teen Choice Awards	Choice TV Actress: Drama	Rachel Bilson	Nominated

== International broadcasts ==
Country	Network(s)	Series premiere	Timeslot	Source(s)
Australia	Fox8	January 7, 2012	Mondays at 8:30 pm AEDT	
Canada	CHCH-DT	September 26, 2011	Mondays at 8 pm Eastern Time Zone	
Ireland	TV3	May 13, 2012	Sundays at 6:30 pm	
New Zealand	TV2	August 5, 2012	Sundays at 5:30 pm	
Philippines	2nd Avenue	September 29, 2011	Thursdays at 8 pm	
Thailand	TrueSeries	July 13, 2012	Fridays at 9 pm	
United Kingdom	Really	April 30, 2012	Mondays at 8 pm	
