= Rachel Bilson =

American actress (born 1981)

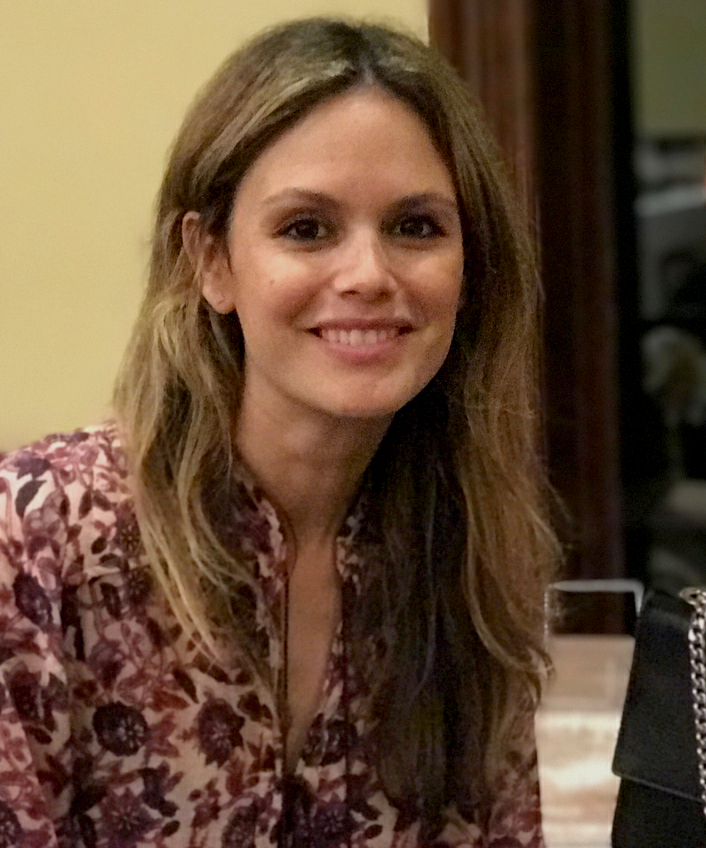
- Bilson in 2017
- Born: Rachel Sarah Bilson; August 25, 1981 (age 45); Los Angeles, California, U.S.
- Education: Grossmont College
- Occupation: Actress
- Years active: 1997–present
- Partner: Hayden Christensen (2007–2017)
- Children: 1
- Father: Danny Bilson
- Relatives: Bruce Bilson (grandfather)

Rachel Sarah Bilson (born August 25, 1981) is an American actress. Born to a California show-business family, Bilson made her television debut in 2003, and then landed the role of Summer Roberts on the prime-time drama series The O.C. Bilson then made her film debut in The Last Kiss (2006) and later starred in the science-fiction-action film Jumper (2008). From 2011 to 2015, she starred as Dr. Zoe Hart on The CW series Hart of Dixie. After stepping back from acting in 2019, she and Melinda Clarke co-hosted the podcast Welcome to the OC, Bitches! from April 2021 to August 2023, and since 2022 she has co-hosted the weekly podcast Broad Ideas with Rachel Bilson and Olivia Allen.

== Early life ==
Bilson was born in Los Angeles, the daughter of Janice Stango, a therapist, and Danny Bilson, a writer, director, and producer. She has an older half-brother and two younger half-sisters, Hattie and Rosemary. Her mother is an Italian-American who was raised Catholic, and her father is Jewish; she has said that she grew up in a "Chrismukkah household".

Bilson's father comes from a show business family; he is the son of Mona Weichman (1933–2023) and producer-director Bruce Bilson (1928–2026). Her British great-grandfather, George Bilson (1902–1981), who was born into an Ashkenazi Jewish immigrant family in Leeds, England, worked for RKO Pictures after immigrating to the United States, heading the movie trailer department, and her great-grandmother, Hattie Bilson (1907–2004), was a screenwriter whose credits included Pal, Canine Detective (1950).

== Career ==
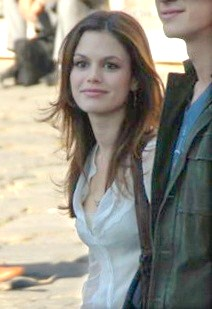
Bilson in 2006

Bilson attended Grossmont College, a community college in a suburb of San Diego, taking her father's advice to pursue a professional acting career. She then made several appearances in commercials, including advertisements for Subway restaurants, Raisin Bran, and Pepto-Bismol.

She made her TV acting debut in 2003, appearing in one episode of Buffy the Vampire Slayer and 8 Simple Rules for Dating My Teenage Daughter. Bilson was subsequently cast in The O.C., which debuted in August 2003. Her character, Summer Roberts, was initially intended to appear in only a few episodes but became a series regular after a successful run, as Summer's romance with Seth Cohen (Adam Brody) became a noted aspect of the series.

At the 2005 Teen Choice Awards, she collected three awards: "Choice Hottie Female", "Choice TV Actress (Drama)", and "Best Onscreen TV Chemistry" (jointly won with Adam Brody). In 2005, Maxim magazine named her sixth in their annual "Hot 100 List"; in 2006, the publication awarded her #14.

The UK edition of FHM Magazine named her 28th in the 2006 100 Sexiest Women in the World list, while the US edition ranked her 77th in 2005. Bilson was also named one of People magazine's "World's Most Beautiful People" in 2006. Before appearing in Maxim, Bilson had turned down requests to appear seminude in men's magazines, specifying that she feels that her body "is sacred" and "not there for the whole world to see".

Bilson's film debut was in The Last Kiss, a romantic comedy-drama also starring Zach Braff in 2006. She played a college student who seduces Braff's character. One review of the film noted that Bilson played the role with "surprising depth", although another critic described her role as "Glenn Close in Fatal Attraction as an airhead valley girl with a hot bod".

In late 2006, Bilson was cast in Doug Liman's thriller Jumper, as the replacement for actress Teresa Palmer. The film was released on February 14, 2008. She appeared in a two-episode arc on The O.C. creator Josh Schwartz's NBC comedy, Chuck, and in the film New York, I Love You. She appeared in the 100th episode of How I Met Your Mother ("Girls Versus Suits") as Ted Mosby's latest love interest and the Mother's roommate.

In September 2008, she started shooting the indie romantic film Waiting for Forever, directed by James Keach. In September 2009, Bilson appeared as a celebrity guest judge in the third episode of Project Runway (season 6). Bilson starred in the 2011 indie film L!fe Happens. In 2011, Bilson began starring in The CW series Hart of Dixie, executive produced by The O.C. creator Josh Schwartz. On May 7, 2015, The CW officially canceled the show after four seasons. In 2017 Bilson joined the cast of CMT's Nashville, which reunited her with her former The O.C. co-star Chris Carmack.

Bilson starred in the ABC drama series Take Two which premiered in June 2018; on November 21, 2018, ABC cancelled the series after one season.

From April 2021 to August 2023, Bilson and her former The O.C. co-star Melinda Clarke hosted a podcast titled Welcome to the OC, Bitches!. The podcast focuses on the hosts and guests re-watching and discussing episodes of The O.C.. Several notable guests have appeared on the podcast such as Mischa Barton, Adam Brody, Peter Gallagher, Josh Schwartz, Jem, Bonnie Somerville and Elizabeth Gillies.

In May 2022, Bilson and longtime friend Olivia Allen launched another podcast called Broad Ideas with Rachel Bilson and Olivia Allen. On each episode, Bilson and Allen interview one or more people from the entertainment industry in a casual, conversational format. The first guest on the show was Kristen Bell, and other notable guests have included Aubrey Plaza, Zooey Deschanel, Elisha Cuthbert, Mena Suvari, and Seth Meyers.

Bilson returned to TV in 2026 in the 9th episode "My Celebration" of season 10 of Scrubs as Charlie, and it is assumed she will be returning in season 11.

=== Fashion design ===
Bilson has been recognized by several media sources as being a "fashion junkie". She has described herself as having a "vintage" sense of style and has noted Kate Moss and Diane Keaton as inspirations.

Much of her fashion collection was lost when her home was burglarized in May 2009. Bilson's fashion and sense of style made her the unwitting target of the Bling Ring, who burglarized her home on several occasions.

Bilson approached DKNY Jeans in late 2007 with a view to design a clothing line with the fashion brand. Together they created Edie Rose. The collection was launched in September 2008. Bilson's idea was to keep fashionable items accessible to young women by keeping the prices of each piece under $100. An advertising image was released in July 2008 which featured Bilson modelling her Edie Rose collection. Bilson stated that she wanted to keep her fashion line "as separate as possible from Rachel Bilson, the actress. I'm hoping people will appreciate it for the clothes, not the person behind them."

In 2011, Bilson collaborated with her personal stylist, Nicole Chavez, and shoe industry leader Steve Madden, to launch the footwear destination ShoeMint, an "online customized shoe shopping experience".

In 2013, Bilson designed a shirt for Invisible Children.

== Personal life ==
Bilson and Adam Brody, her co-star on The O.C., dated from 2003 to 2006.

In 2007, Bilson began a relationship with actor Hayden Christensen, with whom she had co-starred in the film Jumper. By January 2008, the pair had been seen and photographed together around Los Angeles for almost a year, without confirming a relationship. In February 2009, Bilson appeared publicly with what seemed to be an engagement ring, though no official announcement was made. In August 2010, Bilson's representative confirmed there had been an engagement that had since been called off, giving no other details. The two reconciled three months later, and had a daughter in October 2014. Bilson and Christensen separated in September 2017.

In November 2014, when their daughter was only a few days old, Bilson and Christensen announced that they were supporters of the No Kids Policy, a celebrity coalition which seeks to prevent children of celebrities from being photographed without parental consent.

== Filmography ==
=== Film ===
Year	Title	Role	Notes
2003	Unbroken	Rachel	Short film
2006	The Last Kiss	Kim	Nominated—Teen Choice Award for Choice Movie Breakout – Female
2008	Jumper	Millie Harris	Teen Choice Award for Choice Movie Actress – Drama/Action Adventure
2009	New York, I Love You	Molly	
2010	Waiting for Forever	Emma Twist	
2011	Life Happens	Laura	
2013	The To Do List	Amber Klark	
2014	American Heist	Eyewitness	Cameo
2026	Christmas at the Kringles	Julie Severson	

=== Television ===
Year	Title	Role	Notes
1998	It's True!	Jenna	Episode: "The Rats of Rumfordton"
2003	8 Simple Rules	Jenny	Episode: "Career Choices"
2003	Buffy the Vampire Slayer	Colleen	Episode: "Dirty Girls"
2003–2007	The O.C.	Summer Roberts	Main role, 92 episodes Won – Teen Choice Award for Choice TV Actress Drama; Teen Choice Award for Choice TV Actress – Drama/Action Adventure; Teen Choice Award for Choice TV Chemistry (shared with Adam Brody); Nominated – Teen Choice Award for Choice Breakout TV Star – Female; Teen Choice Award for Choice TV Actress – Drama/Action Adventure
2004	MADtv	Summer Roberts	Episode 9.22
2004	That '70s Show	Christy	Episode: "5:15"
2007	Chuck	Lou Palone	2 episodes
2010, 2013–2014	How I Met Your Mother	Cindy	4 episodes
2011–2015	Hart of Dixie	Zoe Hart	Main role, 76 episodes Nominated – Teen Choice Award for Choice TV Actress Drama
2012	Gossip Girl	Herself	Uncredited, episode: "New York, I Love You XOXO"
2016, 2019	Drunk History	Constance Kopp / Helen Callaghan	2 episodes
2017	Nashville	Alyssa Greene	Recurring role (Season 5), 5 episodes
2018	Take Two	Sam Swift	Main role, 13 episodes
2019	Lovestruck	Daisy Valentine	Television film
2023	Accused	Alison	Episode: "Danny's Story"
2026	Scrubs	Charlie	Guest; Three episodes

=== Music video ===
Year	Title	Artist	Role
2000	"Sorority Crime Fighters"	Nibblebox	Jenny
2005	"Not That Kinda Girl"	JoJo	N/A
