= The O.C. season 3 =

The O.C.
- Season 3
- DVD cover
- No. of episodes: 25

Release
- Original network: Fox
- Original release: September 8, 2005 – May 18, 2006

Season chronology
- ← Previous; Season 2 Next → Season 4

The third season of The O.C. commenced airing in the United States on September 8, 2005, concluded on May 18, 2006, and consisted of 25 episodes. The first ten episodes of season three aired Thursdays at 8:00 p.m. ET in the United States on Fox; however, from January 12, 2006, onwards, The O.C. was shifted to a later time of Thursdays at 9:00 p.m. ET.

The season was released on DVD as a seven disc boxed set under the title The O.C.: The Complete Third Season on October 24, 2006, by Warner Home Video.

Season three was also broadcast outside of the United States. In Canada, the season was simulcast on the terrestrial network CTV Television Network. It was broadcast on Network Ten on Tuesdays at 8:30 p.m. (local time) in Australia, and premiered several months after it did in the US. In New Zealand the season started February 11, 2006 on TV NZ. It premiered in the United Kingdom on January 10, 2006, on the digital terrestrial channel E4, airing Tuesdays at 9:00 p.m. GMT. The episodes were rebroadcast the following week on the analogue Channel 4, E4's parent channel, on Sundays at 1:50 p.m. GMT.

== Synopsis ==
This season continues to follow the characters' lives in the wealthy community of Newport Beach, Orange County, California, with the main characters entering their senior year of high school. Ryan's savior complex causes trouble, and Seth's lies pose problems in his relationship with Summer. Meanwhile, Kirsten attends rehab in an attempt to put her life back together, while her husband Sandy assumes leadership of the Newport Group after Caleb's death and finds himself the heir-apparent to a legacy of scandal. Marissa spirals out of control after her younger sister Kaitlin returns with trouble of her own.

== Cast and characters ==
=== Regular ===
- Peter Gallagher as Sandy Cohen (25 episodes)
- Kelly Rowan as Kirsten Cohen (25 episodes)
- Benjamin McKenzie as Ryan Atwood (25 episodes)
- Mischa Barton as Marissa Cooper (25 episodes)
- Adam Brody as Seth Cohen (25 episodes)
- Melinda Clarke as Julie Cooper (24 episodes)
- Rachel Bilson as Summer Roberts (25 episodes)

=== Recurring ===
- Autumn Reeser as Taylor Townsend (15 episodes)
- Michael Nouri as Neil Roberts (14 episodes)
- Cam Gigandet as Kevin Volchok (13 episodes)
- Jeff Hephner as Matt Ramsey (13 episodes)
- Ryan Donowho as Johnny Harper (11 episodes)
- Johnny Lewis as Dennis "Chili" Childress (9 episodes)
- Jeri Ryan as Charlotte Morgan (7 episodes)
- Willa Holland as Kaitlin Cooper (6 episodes)
- Nikki Reed as Sadie Campbell (6 episodes)
- Paula Trickey as Veronica Townsend (5 episodes)
- Eric Mabius as Dean Jack Hess (4 episodes)
- Lisa Rotondi as Gwen Harper (4 episodes)
- Shaun Duke as Henry Griffin (4 episodes)
- Morena Baccarin as Maya Griffin (3 episodes)
- Navi Rawat as Theresa Diaz (3 episodes)
- Daphne Ashbrook as Dawn Atwood (3 episodes)
- Rosalind Chao as Dr Kim (3 episodes)

=== Special guest starring ===
- Samaire Armstrong as Anna Stern (2 episodes)
- Logan Marshall-Green as Trey Atwood (1 episode)
- Nikki Griffin as Jess Sathers (1 episode)

== Episodes ==
No. overall	No. in season	Title	Directed by	Written by	Original release date	Prod. code	U.S. viewers (millions)
52	1	"The Aftermath"	Ian Toynton	Story by : Josh Schwartz & Bob DeLaurentis; Teleplay by : Josh Schwartz	September 8, 2005	2T6251	7.50
Three months after the shooting, the aftermath is still being felt. Ryan and his friends feel like on thin ice as the investigation is still ongoing. Julie takes desperate measures to protect Marissa's future. Jimmy finds himself back into an familiar situation. Sandy takes over Kirsten's job, while Kirsten meets a new friend while in rehab.
53	2	"The Shape of Things to Come"	Tony Wharmby	J. J. Philbin	September 15, 2005	2T6252	6.22
Sandy tries to encourage Kirsten to come home, but her friendship with Charlotte keeps her at rehab. The new Dean of Discipline determines Ryan and Marissa's fates at Harbor. Meanwhile, Summer is not pleased with Taylor Townsend arranging the school's kick-off carnival. Jimmy has an unexpected proposal for Julie.
54	3	"The End of Innocence"	Michael Lange	Stephanie Savage	September 22, 2005	2T6253	6.45
Sandy and Julie begin to interfere in Ryan and Marissa's relationship. Dean Hess threatens Seth and Summer with consequences for their lack of school spirit. Meanwhile, Caleb's will leaves the family in shock and Jimmy in trouble. This episode is named after an album by Don Henley.
55	4	"The Last Waltz"	Ian Toynton	John Stephens	September 29, 2005	2T6254	6.56
Marissa adapts to Newport Union, but Ryan is worried the separation will affect their relationship. Taylor schemes with Seth and Dean Hess' feud, but Summer finds a way to retaliate. Meanwhile, Charlotte arrives in Newport with big plans for Kirsten. Sandy takes over the future of the Newport Group. Also, Julie may no longer be considered a Newport Beach socialite. This episode is named after an album by The Band.
56	5	"The Perfect Storm"	Tony Wharmby	Mike Kelley	November 3, 2005	2T6255	6.65
Sandy, Seth and Summer find a way to blackmail Dean Hess into letting Ryan back into Harbor. Meanwhile, Charlotte makes Julie an offer she can't refuse. This episode is named after the film of the same name.
57	6	"The Swells"	Michael Fresco	J. J. Philbin	November 10, 2005	2T6256	5.76
Taylor throws a Harbor event and plans to separate Seth and Summer. Ryan becomes concerned about Marissa's new life at Newport Union. Meanwhile, Sandy works on a plan for the Newport Group and forms a new partnership. Charlotte convinces Julie to involve Kirsten in her scheme.
58	7	"The Anger Management"	Michael Fresco	John Stephens	November 17, 2005	2T6257	6.20
Marissa is determined to get Volchok to stay away from Ryan. Taylor begins to cause major rifts in Seth and Summer's relationship. Meanwhile, Sandy's new business partner goes above and beyond the call of duty. Charlotte is forced to leave town after Julie makes a bold move in their scheme.
59	8	"The Game Plan"	Tate Donovan	Cory Martin	December 1, 2005	2T6258	5.90
Ryan, Seth and Summer think about their future and start applying to colleges, while Marissa has other plans. Julie is forced to move into a trailer park and Kirsten is determined to help. Meanwhile, Sandy invites an old friend from UC Berkeley to dinner to inspire Ryan and Seth.
60	9	"The Disconnect"	Tony Wharmby	Stephanie Savage	December 8, 2005	2T6259	5.88
Ryan takes an internship working for Sandy at the Newport Group, but he ends up working to save Matt's career. Summer and Seth are determined to get accepted into Brown. Johnny tells Marissa how he feels about her. Julie tries to adapt to her new living situation.
61	10	"The Chrismukkah Bar-Mitzvahkkah"	Ian Toynton	Josh Schwartz	December 15, 2005	2T6260	6.22
Johnny's sudden misfortune forces him to take matters into his own hands, but Marissa and Ryan are determined to help. Kirsten reaches out to Julie about her living situation. Meanwhile, the holidays lead Summer to question Neil about her mother.
62	11	"The Safe Harbor"	Tony Wharmby	Mike Kelley	January 12, 2006	2T6261	5.13
Ryan, Seth, and Summer create a case to bring Marissa back to Harbor, much to Johnny's dismay; Sandy must make an ethical work decision that could influence the judge's verdict. Meanwhile, Neil and Julie are determined to tell their daughters what they've been hiding from them.
63	12	"The Sister Act"	Ian Toynton	Leila Gerstein	January 19, 2006	2T6262	5.36
Kaitlin Cooper returns to Newport, but brings trouble with her and asks Ryan for help. Meanwhile, Veronica Townsend requests a personal favor from Kirsten and threatens Marissa's future at Harbor.
64	13	"The Pot Stirrer"	Norman Buckley	John Stephens	January 26, 2006	2T6263	5.70
Marissa tries everything she can to rebuild her relationship with Kaitlin, who teaches Seth an alternative stress reliever. Sandy and Matt work together to secure a contract for the new hospital. Meanwhile, Julie is determined to bring her family together.
65	14	"The Cliffhanger"	Michael Lange	J. J. Philbin	February 2, 2006	2T6264	5.35
Tensions between Ryan, Julie, Marissa and Johnny lead to a shocking turn of events. Seth confronts Summer about his Brown interview. Meanwhile, Kirsten and Julie take their dating service a little too far.
66	15	"The Heavy Lifting"	Ian Toynton	Stephanie Savage	February 9, 2006	2T6265	5.25
Johnny's death brings a relative to Newport, who makes Ryan question his feelings for Marissa. Summer confronts Seth about the marijuana and his lies. Kaitlin returns to boarding school. Meanwhile, Kirsten and Julie throw a Valentine's Day party to promote NewMatch.
67	16	"The Road Warrior"	Michael Fresco	Mike Kelley	March 9, 2006	2T6266	7.36
Ryan and Sadie go on a road trip to find Johnny's dad, while Marissa's being investigated. Meanwhile, Seth and Summer discover Julie and Neil's secret relationship.
68	17	"The Journey"	Roxann Dawson	John Stephens	March 16, 2006	2T6267	5.40
Ryan struggles whether to invite Marissa to his birthday party or not, while Sandy decides if he should invite one of Ryan's family members. Neil and Julie decide to tell Marissa and Summer about their relationship. Volchok tries to become involved in Marissa's life.
69	18	"The Undertow"	Robert Duncan McNeill	Mark Fish & J. J. Philbin	March 23, 2006	2T6268	5.36
An old nemesis returns to Newport, causing rifts in Ryan's new relationship with Sadie. Seth and Summer turn to Taylor when their relationship struggles. Marissa finds herself all alone in Newport and spends the night with Volchok. Meanwhile, Sandy grapples with business pressure.
70	19	"The Secrets and Lies"	Michael Fresco	Stephanie Savage & Josh Schwartz	March 30, 2006	2T6269	5.50
Julie and Neil tell their daughters about their engagement; however, Marissa distances herself from Summer when she gets closer to Volchok. Ryan tries to move on with his relationship with Sadie. Meanwhile, Kirsten and Seth have a night out. At the Newport Group, Sandy has to deal with Matt's mishaps.
71	20	"The Day After Tomorrow"	Norman Buckley	Leila Gerstein	April 6, 2006	2T6270	5.06
Ryan and Sadie plan their future after high school, but their decision concerns Sandy and Kirsten. Marissa and Summer begin to rebuild their friendship. Meanwhile, the drama surrounding Sandy's job intensifies and seeps into the Cohen household.
72	21	"The Dawn Patrol"	Ian Toynton	Mike Kelley	April 13, 2006	2T6271	4.33
Ryan leaves Newport to invite Dawn to graduation, but hesitates. Summer and Taylor try to uncover what Seth is hiding from them. Julie confronts Volchok about his relationship with Marissa. Meanwhile, Sandy begins to pay more attention to the Newport Group than his home life.
73	22	"The College Try"	Tony Wharmby	J. J. Philbin	April 20, 2006	2T6272	5.36
Ryan and Marissa leave Newport to attend an orientation at UC Berkeley, while Seth visits Brown and sees a familiar face, to Summer's displeasure. Kirsten is surprised to see someone from the family's past at the airport, and turns to Sandy for support.
74	23	"The Party Favor"	Michael Lange	John Stephens	April 27, 2006	2T6273	5.41
Ryan invites Theresa to prom, while Marissa bring Volchok, who only causes trouble. Anna helps Seth rebuild his relationship with Summer. Meanwhile, Kirsten turns to Julie for support. Sandy finds trouble in the hospital development.
75	24	"The Man of the Year"	Tony Wharmby	Stephanie Savage	May 4, 2006	2T6274	5.10
Sandy and Seth confront each other about their recent behaviors. Volchok leads Ryan into trouble. Kirsten returns to some bad habits. Meanwhile, Marissa leaves Newport when Kaitlin calls for a favor.
76	25	"The Graduates"	Ian Toynton	Story by : Bob DeLaurentis & Josh Schwartz; Teleplay by : Josh Schwartz	May 18, 2006	2T6275	6.40
Graduation day celebrations are cut short as the day takes a tragic turn for one of the graduates.

== Crew ==
The season was produced by Warner Bros. Television and Wonderland Sound and Vision. The executive producers were series creator Josh Schwartz, McG, a co-founder of Wonderland, and Bob DeLaurentis. Stephanie Savage, the other co-founder of Wonderland, served as co-executive producer, whilst Ian Toynton served as supervising producer. The staff writers were Schwartz, Savage, DeLaurentis, John Stephens, J.J. Philbin and Mike Kelley. The regular directors throughout the season were Toynton, Michael Lange, Michael Fresco, Norman Buckley and Tony Wharmby.

== Cast ==
Season 3 cast; from left to right: Julie, Marissa, Sandy, Kirsten, Ryan, Seth and Summer.

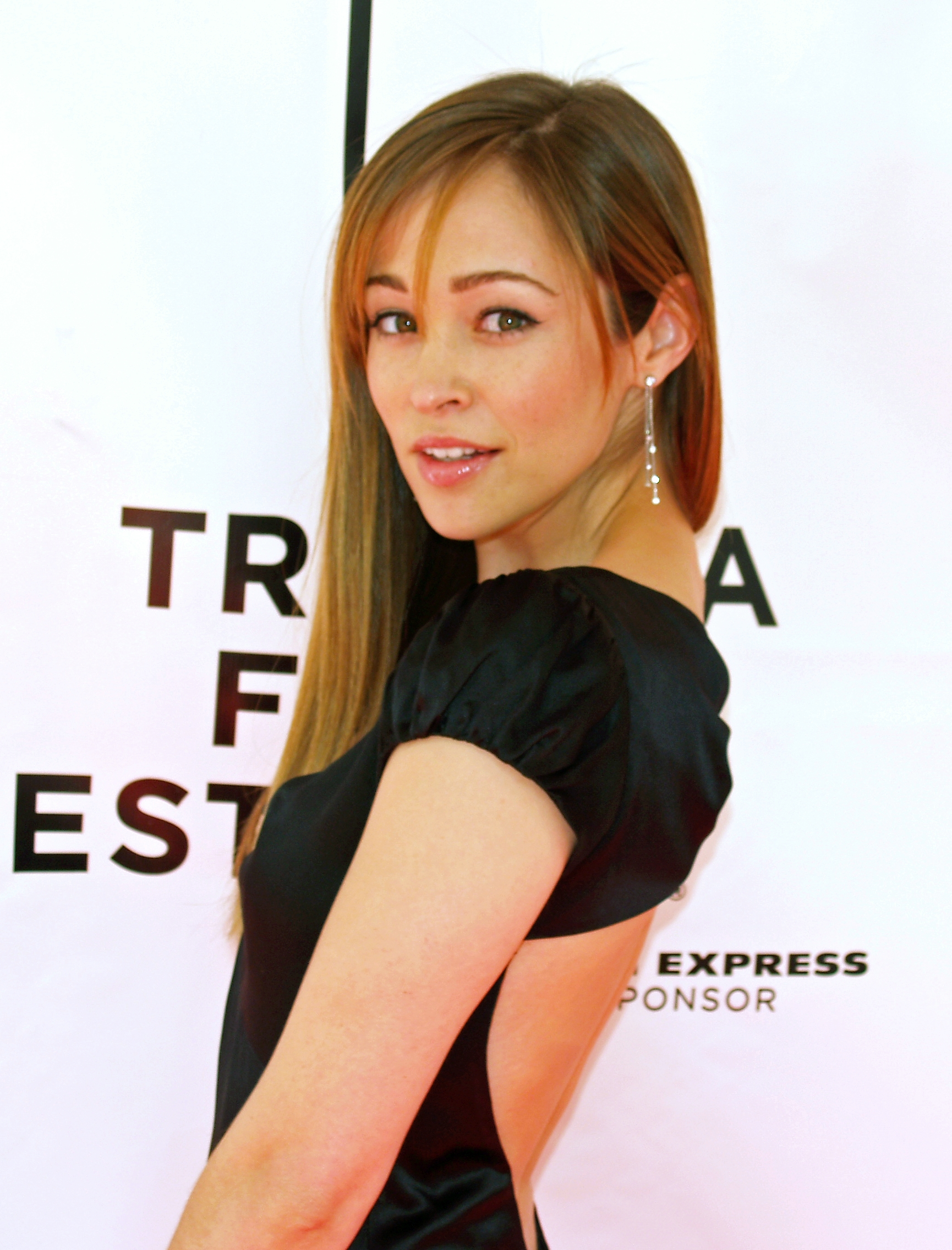
Autumn Reeser, who joined the cast as Taylor Townsend.

The third season had star billing for seven major roles. Mischa Barton as Marissa, Rachel Bilson as Summer, Adam Brody as Seth, Melinda Clarke as Julie, Peter Gallagher as Sandy, Benjamin McKenzie as Ryan, and Kelly Rowan as Kirsten all returned to the main cast. Former main cast member Alan Dale did not return due to his character, Caleb, dying at the end of the second season, while Tate Donovan, as Jimmy Cooper, returned only in a recurring role, and then only for the first three episodes of the season.

Logan Marshall-Green returned for the season premiere, portraying Trey Atwood, comatosed as a result of the shooting in the second-season finale. Additionally Navi Rawat, Samaire Armstrong, Daphne Ashbrook and Nikki Griffin all made brief returns to guest star as Theresa Diaz, Anna Stern, Dawn Atwood, and Jess Sathers, respectively. Willa Holland took over from Shailene Woodley in portraying Marissa's younger sister Kaitlin, who returns to the show after being away at boarding school last year. Cast member Michael Nouri continued as Summer's dad, Dr. Neil Roberts, who became a larger part of the series. Other actors to leave the series were Nicholas Gonzalez (D.J.), Michael Cassidy (Zach), Shannon Lucio (Lindsay), Olivia Wilde (Alex), Billy Campbell (Carter), Kim Delaney (Rebecca), Johnny Messner (Lance), Kathleen York (Renee), and Marguerite Moreau (Reed).

The season introduced a number of new students to the show. Additions to the cast included Autumn Reeser, Cam Gigandet, Ryan Donowho and Johnny Lewis, as new social chair Taylor Townsend, rival surfers Kevin Volchok and Johnny Harper, and Johnny's best friend Chili. Jeri Ryan and Jeff Hephner also joined the cast to portray new adult characters Charlotte Morgan, a mysterious woman Kirsten befriends in rehab, and Matt Ramsey, an overzealous business partner working at the Newport Group. New guest stars in recurring roles included Paula Trickey as Taylor's mother, Veronica Townsend; Erin Foster as a Newport Union student called Heather; Kayla Ewell and Nikki Reed as Johnny's girlfriend, Casey, and cousin Sadie; Eric Mabius as new Dean of Discipline, Jack Hess; Shaun Duke as Henry Griffin, head of the board at Newport Hospital; and Morena Baccarin as Griffin's daughter Maya. This is the final season for original cast member Mischa Barton who played Marissa Cooper; Marissa tragically dies in a car accident in the season finale.

== Reception ==
Season three was widely regarded by both fans and critics as the worst season of The O.C. The season premiere attracted 7.5 million viewers, but average viewing figures decreased twenty percent from the previous season to 5.6 million. The first half of the season averaged 6.3 million viewers, representing a substantial decrease in the show's popularity. However Marcy Ross, head of current programming at FOX said that the "ratings are perfectly fine and acceptable". After the eventual cancellation of the show, Schwartz admitted that "the whole first half of the third season was a total mess".

The third season was nominated for five Teen Choice Awards and won four of them, including "Choice Drama/Action Adventure Show" and "Choice Actor: Drama/Action Adventure", which Adam Brody won for the third consecutive year. IGN faulted a season which, in their opinion, had "far too much time and too many episodes spent with the less than beloved character Johnny". IGN also noted that "Kirsten and Sandy both suffered from unsatisfying stories", and that the departure of character Caleb Nichol had been a mistake "as he had been a great character to bounce off both of the elder Cohens". In September 2007, Schwartz admitted in an interview for New York that the show "went down the wrong road" with Johnny. The season did, however, receive some praise. The new character Taylor Townsend was stated as being "played to perfection by Autumn Reeser" and her character was described as "one of the greatest elements of The O.C." Jeffrey Robinson of DVD Talk described the storylines as "very intelligent and also incorporate a great deal of humor to keep your interest".

USA Today critic Robert Bianco said that the season premiere was "as dreary and ridiculous as any episode the show ever gave us", but the season finale was commended by IGN's Eric Goldman for killing off main character Marissa Cooper. Goldman said that "the episode documenting her demise was a fairly strong one" and that the following season "would really pay off this shocking twist". Despite not being the final season it was also noted that the graduation of characters gave "the show a feeling of ending".

== DVD release ==
The DVD release of season three was released by Warner Bros. in the US on October 24, 2006, after it had completed broadcast on television. As well as every episode from the season, the DVD release features bonus material including a gag reel, featurettes, and the making of a music video by The Subways.

The O.C. - The Complete Third Season
Set details		Special features	
25 episodes; 7-disc set; Running Time: (Region 1) 1089 minutes; (Region 2) 1089 minutes; (Region 4) 1042 minutes; 1.78:1 aspect ratio; English (Dolby Surround 2.0); Subtitles: French, Spanish		Music Video - Making of The Subways music video; Pass the Remote - Scene surfing commentary.; Gag reel; Featurettes; What's in a Name?; From Script to Screen - The Party Favor	
Release dates
United States	Canada	United Kingdom	Australia
October 24, 2006		September 4, 2006	September 6, 2006
