= Oliver Trask =

- The O.C. character
- Taylor Handley as Oliver Trask
- First appearance: "The Best Chrismukkah Ever" (episode 1.13)
- Last appearance: "The Truth" (episode 1.18)
- Created by: Josh Schwartz
- Portrayed by: Taylor Handley

In-universe information
- Gender: Male
- Occupation: High school student
- Residence: Newport Beach, California

Oliver Trask is a fictional character on the FOX television series The O.C., portrayed by Taylor Handley. Oliver appeared in the series' first season as a thorn in Ryan Atwood and Marissa Cooper's relationship, soon developing a severe obsession with the latter. After holding Marissa captive at gunpoint in his penthouse, Oliver was arrested and sent to a rehabilitation clinic.

== Character development ==
=== Concept and creation ===
Oliver was created by Josh Schwartz, whose concept for the character was "based on a guy...a friend of mine dated who faked having cancer to [hang on to her]." Schwartz said of the guy "That kind of desperation and loneliness was really fascinating to me, and that's what inspired the Oliver character."

=== Characterization ===
"Instead of being poor, he was extremely wealthy. Instead of being a good guy, this was a guy with an agenda and a little bit, ummm... not well. He was a lonely, lonely kid who was really going to get in the way and disrupt the relationship between Ryan and Marissa"
— Josh Schwartz on the character Oliver

Taylor Handley says of his character that "Oliver is very intelligent, (...) and intelligent people are good manipulators." Handley also elaborated that "[his] character is very needy due to his past" which would take some of Marissa's attention away from Ryan, and that, by request, he dyed his hair dark for the show to give "a more sinister look".

Oliver used to go to a school referred to as "Pacific". At his former school Oliver was obsessed with a girl and cut his wrists. She had a restraining order filed against him, and later attended rehabilitation.

== Storylines ==
According to Schwartz the storyline was "designed as a six-episode arc where we would bring in a character whose circumstances coming into this world were not unlike Ryan's".

=== Season 1 ===
Oliver Trask is a rich kid who lives in the penthouse of a hotel. His parents own a chain of hotels, and are largely absent from his life. He left his last school, Pacific High, because a girl took out a restraining order against him, after he became obsessed with her. Oliver eventually attempts suicide because she rejects him. He meets Marissa Cooper (Mischa Barton) at therapy, and falls for her and transfers to Harbor to get close to her. Marissa initially thinks of him as merely a casual friend, and so doesn't notice anything sinister in his constant presence in her life. Marissa's boyfriend, Ryan Atwood (Ben McKenzie), doesn't trust him, and warns Marissa about her new friend's intentions. Marissa and many of their friends dismiss Ryan's warnings as jealousy; Luke Ward (Chris Carmack) believes him, however, having taken an instant dislike to Oliver.

In the episode "The Truth", Oliver invites Marissa to his parents' penthouse hotel room. Once there, he becomes possessive and threatening, and refuses to let Marissa leave, producing a gun and threatening to kill himself when she calls Ryan in tears. Ryan bursts in and pleads with Oliver to put the gun down for Marissa's sake. Oliver does so, and is led away in police custody.

== Reception ==
TV Guide described Oliver as a "clichéd plot device" and a "cookie-cutter villain", but Schwartz said that reception was mixed with viewers loving the character as "someone that we love to hate." Other reception noted that he was irritating but "addicting person to watch", that he "was able to exude as much hate that a writer could place on a single character", and that he was an "audience-infuriating nut". Entertainment Weekly included him their list of "21 Most Annoying TV Characters Ever", commenting: "Oliver (Taylor Handley) was around for only six episodes, but it seemed like much longer. Just the mention of Oliver's name still makes us brood."

== Effect ==
Oliver's appearance lasted only a few episodes - from "The Best Chrismukkah Ever" (Season 1, Episode 13) to "The Truth" (Season 1, Episode 18). However, the character's actions had long term implications. Already existing trust issues between Ryan and Marissa were exacerbated by the conflict over Oliver's true colors. It is argued by Seth in "The Ties that Bind" (Season 1, Episode 27) that Marissa's relationship with Oliver may have driven Ryan to seek solace with Theresa, resulting in the scandal over Theresa's pregnancy and marriage that arises in the final episodes of the show's first season and into the second season.

== Rumors ==
It was rumoured that Oliver would return for the finale of season two. These rumours were untrue (though in the second season finale, after Seth hears a door bell ring he quips: "With the way things are going right now, I bet that's Oliver." This could have been a reference to these rumors, but was more likely due to how badly things seemed to be going for the characters.) Schwartz made repeated references to Oliver's return. He is quoted as stating that a return was the alternative option to the lesbian storyline between Marissa and Alex. After the finale for that season aired, rumors then arose that Oliver would return in the third season with Kirsten, who was in rehab for alcoholism. However, this never happened, although in the third season finale when Marissa apologizes to Ryan for all the craziness, Ryan assures that he would not have done anything different, "except for maybe Oliver," to which Marissa laughed and said "me too."
