= The O.C. season 2 =

The O.C.
- Season 2
- DVD cover
- No. of episodes: 24

Release
- Original network: Fox
- Original release: November 4, 2004 – May 19, 2005

Season chronology
- ← Previous; Season 1 Next → Season 3

The second season of The O.C. commenced airing in the United States on November 4, 2004, concluded on May 19, 2005, and consisted of 24 episodes. It aired Thursdays at 8:00 p.m. ET in the United States on Fox. In addition to the regular 24 episodes, two special episodes aired before the season premiere. "The O.C.: Obsess Completely" documented the show's influence on popular culture in its first year. The following week, "Welcome to The O.C.: A Day in the Life," provided a behind-the-scenes look at the show.

The season was released on DVD as a seven-disc boxed set under the title The O.C.: The Complete Second Season on August 23, 2005, by Warner Home Video. On September 7, 2008, the season became available to purchase for registered users of the US iTunes Store. In the United Kingdom the season premiered January 11, 2005 on Channel 4. In Canada the season aired on CTV Television Network and in Australia it was broadcast by Network Ten.

== Synopsis ==
It's junior year for Ryan, Marissa, Summer, and Seth all the while they all navigate the tension that's been building all summer long. Problems from both past and present soon creep into Kirsten and Sandy marriage that has it hanging on by a thread. Now married to Caleb, Julie tries to take the reign as the new Queen of Newport, however her dangerous past catches up with her. Ryan's older ex-con brother Trey gives Newport a try.

== Cast and characters ==
=== Regular ===
- Peter Gallagher as Sandy Cohen (24 episodes)
- Kelly Rowan as Kirsten Cohen (24 episodes)
- Benjamin McKenzie as Ryan Atwood (24 episodes)
- Mischa Barton as Marissa Cooper (24 episodes)
- Adam Brody as Seth Cohen (24 episodes)
- Melinda Clarke as Julie Cooper (21 episodes)
- Rachel Bilson as Summer Roberts (24 episodes)
- Alan Dale as Caleb Nichol (19 episodes)
- Tate Donovan as Jimmy Cooper (8 episodes)

=== Recurring ===
- Michael Cassidy as Zach Stevens (19 episodes)
- Olivia Wilde as Alex Kelly (13 episodes)
- Shannon Lucio as Lindsay Gardener (12 episodes)
- Logan Marshall-Green as Trey Atwood (8 episodes)
- Billy Campbell as Carter Buckley (7 episodes)
- Nikki Griffin as Jess Sathers (7 episodes)
- Nicholas Gonzalez as D.J. (6 episodes)
- Johnny Messner as Lance Baldwin (5 episodes)
- Kim Delaney as Rebecca Bloom (4 episodes)
- Marguerite Moreau as Reed Carlson (4 episodes)
- Kathleen York as Renee Wheeler (4 episodes)

=== Special guest starring ===
- Amanda Righetti as Hailey Nichol (2 episodes)
- Navi Rawat as Theresa Diaz (2 episodes)
- Chris Carmack as Luke Ward (1 episode)
- George Lucas as himself (1 episode)

== Episodes ==
No. overall	No. in season	Title	Directed by	Written by	Original release date	Prod. code	U.S. viewers (millions)
28	1	"The Distance"	Ian Toynton	Josh Schwartz	November 4, 2004	2T5101	8.56
As the summer comes to a close, Sandy tries to convince both Seth and Ryan to return home. Meanwhile, Summer and Marissa try different ways to cope with their departures. Caleb is holding onto a life altering secret.
29	2	"The Way We Were"	Michael Lange	Allan Heinberg	November 11, 2004	2T5102	8.08
Back in Newport, Ryan and Seth try to rebuild their relationships with Marissa and Summer. Hailey tells Jimmy about her plans to move for a fashion career, but he does whatever he can to make her stay. Meanwhile, Sandy informs Julie that the District Attorney is paying close attention to Caleb.
30	3	"The New Kids on the Block"	Lev L. Spiro	Stephanie Savage	November 18, 2004	2T5103	7.42
Seth gets a job at the Bait Shop and turns to his boss for advice on how to rebuild his relationship with Summer. Ryan has a series of mishaps with a new classmate. Meanwhile, Caleb's legal issues threaten to leave Sandy and Kirsten unemployed.
31	4	"The New Era"	Michael Fresco	J. J. Philbin	December 2, 2004	2T5104	6.51
Seth and Ryan go on a double date with unexpected results. Sandy is fired from the law firm. Meanwhile, Julie finds herself overwhelmed at the Newport Group and turns to Jimmy for advice.
32	5	"The SnO.C."	Ian Toynton	John Stephens	December 9, 2004	2T5105	6.36
Summer's relationship with Seth strains her relationship with Zach. Ryan asks Lindsay to go to the SnO.C. dance. Meanwhile, Julie finds out about Marissa and D.J.'s relationship and turns to Jimmy for advice. Sandy gets closer to the truth Caleb has been hiding.
33	6	"The Chrismukkah That Almost Wasn't"	Tony Wharmby	Josh Schwartz	December 16, 2004	2T5106	6.27
Caleb is on the verge of facing serious jail time, but Sandy tells him to confess his involvement with Renee, which could destroy both their relationships with Kirsten and the rest of the family. Jimmy and Julie's feelings for each other deepen.
34	7	"The Family Ties"	Lesli Glatter	Drew Greenberg & Josh Schwartz	January 6, 2005	2T5107	7.65
Ryan and Lindsay try to keep their relationship a secret from Kirsten to avoid any more awkwardness. Seth changes his image in an attempt to impress Alex. After realizing his relationship with Julie can only lead to trouble, Jimmy decides to leave for Maui, and a drunken Marissa shows up at his going away party to confront both her parents.
35	8	"The Power of Love"	Michael Lange	John Stephens	January 13, 2005	2T5108	7.46
Sandy confronts Alex about her relationship with Seth. Ryan and Lindsay try to determine the fate of their relationship. Meanwhile, Summer meets Zach's family. Julie confronts D.J. about his relationship with Marissa, leading him to leave town.
36	9	"The Ex-Factor"	Michael Fresco	J. J. Philbin	January 20, 2005	2T5109	7.87
After a girls' night out, Ryan finds Marissa to blame for a drunk and passed out Lindsay. Alex's ex is in town and Seth is determined to find out who it is. Meanwhile, Julie and Kirsten collaborate to promote Newport Group's image.
37	10	"The Accomplice"	Ian Toynton	Allan Heinberg	January 27, 2005	2T5110	8.11
Ryan tries to convince Lindsay to build a relationship with Caleb. Seth and Zach team up to create a comic book. Sandy decides to help his old law school professor find his daughter. Marissa finds new ways to rebel while Julie is out of town.
38	11	"The Second Chance"	Tony Wharmby	Drew Greenberg & Josh Schwartz	February 3, 2005	2T5111	7.25
Kirsten hosts a disastrous dinner for Lindsay, Caleb and Ryan. Sandy keeps Rebecca's presence in Newport a secret from Kirsten. Meanwhile, Marissa and Alex grow closer. Seth and Summer spend time together to work on the comic book.
39	12	"The Lonely Hearts Club"	Ian Toynton	J. J. Philbin	February 10, 2005	2T5112	8.15
Sandy tries to make amends with Kirsten after she finds Rebecca living in his office. Seth, Summer and Zach go to San Diego to promote the comic book idea, but Seth uses the trip for his personal gain. With Lindsey trying to bond with Caleb, Ryan begins to feel left out. Meanwhile, Julie is back in town and attempts to reconnect with Marissa.
40	13	"The Father Knows Best"	Michael Lange	John Stephens	February 17, 2005	2T5113	7.79
Sandy's help with Rebecca's case affects his marriage. Caleb requests a paternity test for Lindsay. Meanwhile, Seth worries as Summer and Zach plan a trip together. Marissa's new relationship with Alex intensifies.
41	14	"The Rainy Day Women"	Michael Fresco	Josh Schwartz	February 24, 2005	2T5114	7.23
A rare but violent rainstorm hits Newport as Sandy's help with Rebecca's case begins to become dangerous. Ryan manages to convince Lindsay to take the paternity test, but it causes more harm than good. Marissa takes a big step to confirm her relationship with Alex. Seth manages to get Summer's attention.
42	15	"The Mallpisode"	Ian Toynton	Stephanie Savage	March 10, 2005	2T5115	7.66
A postcard from Zach comes in between Seth and Summer's rekindling. The "fantastic four" spend their day/night at the mall doing some charity work, providing Ryan and Marissa with apt distraction from the issues of their love lives. Marissa begins hiding things from Alex when she spends a night with Ryan. Kirsten begins to get to know the new editor of "Newport Living", while Julie finds her past right at her doorstep.
43	16	"The Blaze of Glory"	Robert Duncan McNeill	Mike Kelley	March 17, 2005	2T5116	7.55
Alex's jealousy of Ryan gets in way of her relationship with Marissa. Meanwhile, Kirsten wants Carter to continue working with the magazine. With Lance breathing down her neck, Julie seeks Sandy's legal help.
44	17	"The Brothers Grim"	Michael Lange	J. J. Philbin	March 24, 2005	2T5117	8.59
Marissa and Ryan explore their newfound relationship, but a surprise guest from Ryan's past arrives to Newport. Zach returns from Italy and confronts Seth and Summer with news. Meanwhile, Julie seeks Kirsten's advice with her sex tape.
45	18	"The Risky Business"	Norman Buckley	Cory Martin	April 7, 2005	2T5118	6.79
Trey's arrival brings trouble to the Newport Beach yard sale. Zach and Seth's comic book gets help from Carter.
46	19	"The Rager"	Tony Wharmby	John Stephens	April 14, 2005	2T5119	6.39
Marissa convinces Ryan to help throw Trey a birthday party, which rapidly gets out of control. Summer finally meets Reed, much to Seth's displeasure. Sandy and Carter's friendship begins to grow. Meanwhile, Julie returns to Newport and decides to confront Lance.
47	20	"The O.C. Confidential"	Tony Wharmby	Mike Kelley	April 21, 2005	2T5120	6.55
Sandy, Ryan and Marissa try to help Trey from going back to jail. Kirsten and Carter take a trip to the wine country. Meanwhile, Caleb returns from Europe a changed man.
48	21	"The Return of the Nana"	Ian Toynton	Josh Schwartz	April 28, 2005^{*}	2T5121	6.77
As Sandy, Seth and Ryan go to Miami to visit the Nana, a drunken night between Trey and Marissa puts everything in jeopardy. Meanwhile, Kirsten's feelings for Carter deepen once he tells her devastating news.
49	22	"The Showdown"	Michael Fresco	John Stephens	May 5, 2005^{*}	2T5122	7.19
Carter's departure takes a heavy toll on Kirsten. With Marrisa and Trey acting nervous, Ryan begins to act suspicious. Summer confronts Reed about Seth's and Zach's behavior. Meanwhile, Caleb confronts Julie about her lies.
50	23	"The O.Sea"	Michael Lange	J. J. Philbin	May 12, 2005	2T5123	6.12
Caleb and Kirsten reach their breaking point as he tries to confront her drinking. Ryan heads home to Chino to find Trey, but runs into someone unexpected. Meanwhile, Seth and Zach are hit with a major conflict as their big comic book meeting is the same night as their junior prom. Julie devises a plan to protect her and her daughters, but it quickly goes awry.
51	24	"The Dearly Beloved"	Ian Toynton	Josh Schwartz	May 19, 2005	2T5124	7.63
As Caleb's funeral brings back old faces, Kirsten continues to hit Rock bottom, which prompts Sandy to take action. Meanwhile, as the truth is uncovered about Trey and Marissa's night, the feud between Ryan and Trey takes an explosive turn.

=== Notes ===
^* - These episodes were first shown in Canada at 8:00 p.m. ET on CTV. In America the airing of "The Return of the Nana" was postponed due to a press conference by President Bush. Instead it aired the following week at 8:00 p.m. ET immediately followed by "The Showdown" at 9:00 p.m.

== Crew ==
The season was produced by Warner Bros. Television and Wonderland Sound and Vision. The executive producers were series creator Josh Schwartz, McG and Bob DeLaurentis. Stephanie Savage and Allan Heinberg served as co-executive producers, with Loucas George credited as producer. The staff writers were Schwartz, Savage, Heinberg, John Stephens, J.J. Philbin and Mike Kelley. The regular directors throughout the season were Michael Lange, Ian Toynton, Michael Fresco and Tony Wharmby.

== Cast ==
From left to right: New additions to the cast: D.J., Lindsay, Zach and Alex.

The second season had star billing for nine major roles. Peter Gallagher as Sandy Cohen, Kelly Rowan as Kirsten Cohen, Ben McKenzie as Ryan Atwood, Mischa Barton as Marissa Cooper, Adam Brody as Seth Cohen, Melinda Clarke as recently married Julie Cooper-Nichol and Rachel Bilson as Summer Roberts all returned to the main cast. Tate Donovan also initially reprised his role as Jimmy Cooper, but was written out of the series in the seventh episode. However Donovan returned with Jimmy as a guest star in the season finale. Alan Dale, as newly wed Caleb Nichol, joined the main cast, having previously been a recurring role. Former main cast member Chris Carmack, who portrayed Luke Ward, only guest starred in the first episode.

Nicholas Gonzalez (as D.J.), Michael Cassidy (as Zach Stevens), Shannon Lucio (as Lindsay Gardner) and Olivia Wilde (as Alex Kelly) all took up recurring roles in the show as love interests of existing characters, Marissa, Summer, Ryan and Seth, who are all single now.

Actors returning as guest stars included Amanda Righetti (as Hailey Nichol), Michael Nouri (as Dr. Neil Roberts), Navi Rawat (as Theresa Diaz), Brian McNamara (as Carson Ward), Kim Oja (as Taryn Baker) and Linda Lavin (as The Nana). Ryan's brother Trey Atwood also returned, but Logan Marshall-Green replaced Bradley Stryker in portraying him. Other guest stars in new recurring roles included Billy Campbell, as magazine editor Carter Buckley, Kim Delaney, as Sandy's ex-fiancée Rebecca Bloom, Johnny Messner, as Julie's ex-boyfriend Lance Baldwin, Kathleen York, as mother of Caleb's illegitimate child Renee Wheeler, Nikki Griffin as party girl and drug addict Jess Sathers and Marguerite Moreau, as Reed Carlson the Vice President of a graphic novel company, and Max Burkholder as a child in airport, with a toy similar to Captain Oats, in "The Rainy Day Women"

== Reception ==
The second season was widely received as inferior to the first, but it has been noted that this may be slightly unfair. The show moved to "ultra-competitive Thursday" nights, which Schwartz described as a "real vote of confidence [from] the network", but many attributed placing The O.C. against the likes of Survivor, Joey and Will & Grace as part of The O.C.'s decline in popularity. The move improved FOX's performance at the new time slot, but lost the show viewers. The season premiere attracted 8.6 million viewers, but average viewing figures decreased thirty percent from the previous season to 7 million.

For the second season the show was nominated for five Teen Choice Awards winning four of them, including best drama. It was also nominated for the Favorite Television Drama People's Choice Award. Kelly Rowan won a PRISM Award for Performance in a Drama Series Episode, with Peter Gallagher also getting nominated. Additionally the season finale was nominated for the TV Drama Series Episode award. The introduction of bisexual character Alex, was praised as "an especially charismatic new presence", with the show was praised for its handling of her lesbian relationship with Marissa. Mischa Barton was criticized for her acting skills in portraying Marissa, alongside other noted flaws including "flavorless plots", and "flat new characters who failed to grab the audience's interest". IGN faulted the move to quickly rekindle the Ryan and Marissa relationship and "abruptly write off Alex and Lindsay, after [making] them a pretty big part of the show" but commended a "compelling story centering on Ryan's brother Trey coming to town, leading to a very dramatic season finale" Tate Donovan, who played Jimmy, credited a drop in ratings to "the show moving away from the family dynamic to focus more on the kids".

== DVD release ==
The DVD release of season two was released by Warner Bros. in the US on August 23, 2005, after it had completed broadcast on television. As well as every episode from the season, the DVD release features bonus material including a gag reel, audio commentary and a fashion featurette.

The O.C. - The Complete Second Season
Set details		Special features	
24 episodes; 7-disc set^{A}; Running Time: (Region 1) 1048 minutes; (Region 2) 999 minutes; (Region 4) 1007 minutes; 1.78:1 aspect ratio; English (Dolby Surround 2.0); Subtitles: English, French, Spanish		Directors Cut; "The Rainy Day Women"; Audio Commentary: "The Chrismukkah That Almost Wasn't"; "The Rainy Day Women"; Beachy Couture: How O.C. Fashion Is Made; The O.C.: Obsessed Completely - TV Special; Gag Reel - Seasons 1 and 2	
Release dates
United States	Canada	United Kingdom	Australia
August 23, 2005		August 8, 2005	September 7, 2005

- ^Note A: - In the UK the DVD was released as a 6-disc set. Omitted was the US release seventh disc that featured Beachy Couture, Obsess Completely and the two season gag reel.
