= Premiere (The O.C.) =

First episode of The O.C.

- The O.C. episode
- Episode no.: Season 1 Episode 1
- Directed by: Doug Liman
- Written by: Josh Schwartz
- Production code: 475197
- Original air date: August 5, 2003

Guest appearances
- Bradley Stryker as Trey Atwood; Daphne Ashbrook as Dawn Atwood; Ron del Barrio as A.J.; Chris Carmack as Luke Ward; Melinda Clarke as Julie Cooper; Shailene Woodley as Kaitlin Cooper; Rachel Bilson as Summer Roberts; Ruth Williamson as Peggy; Ashley Hartman as Holly Fischer; Drew Fuller as Norland

Episode chronology
| ← Previous — | Next → "The Model Home" |
- The O.C. (season 1)

"Premiere" (also known as "Pilot") is the series premiere of the American teen drama television series The O.C., which premiered on Fox on August 5, 2003. Written by series creator Josh Schwartz and directed by executive producer Doug Liman, the episode depicts the introduction of troubled teenager Ryan Atwood (Benjamin McKenzie) into the wealthy lifestyle of the Cohen family in Newport Beach, Orange County, California.

The casting directors, Patrick J. Rush and Alyson Silverberg, began selecting the principal cast eight to ten weeks before filming started. The role of Ryan was particularly hard to cast. Seth Cohen (Adam Brody) was based on Schwartz's experiences at the University of Southern California as a "neurotic Jewish kid from the East Coast in a land of water polo players". Other central characters in the episode are Seth's parents—Sandy (Peter Gallagher) and Kirsten (Kelly Rowan)—and teenage next-door neighbor Marissa Cooper (Mischa Barton).

The series premiere led the first half-hour of its time slot in viewership. It was generally well received by critics, and earned Schwartz a Writers Guild of America Award nomination for Best Screenplay in an Episodic Drama. Rush and Silverberg received an Artios Award nomination for excellence of casting in the Dramatic Pilot category. Originally broadcast and released in a 1.33:1 aspect ratio, it was remastered in a widescreen ratio for the series DVD, released in November 2007. The episode was released on MiniDVD on April 26, 2005, and is available to purchase from video on demand services.

== Plot ==
A cold open shows Trey Atwood (Bradley Stryker) and his brother Ryan (Ben McKenzie) stealing a car. The police chase and arrest the boys, resulting in a prison term for Trey and a short stay in juvenile hall for the underage Ryan. A conversation between Ryan and his public defender, Sandy Cohen (Peter Gallagher), establishes Ryan as a smart boy with a rough upbringing; he has three truancies and two suspensions, but his SAT I scores are in the ninety-eighth percentile. When Ryan's mother, Dawn (Daphne Ashbrook), collects Ryan, Sandy gives his business card to the boy. At home in Chino, Dawn asks Ryan to leave, and her boyfriend, A.J. (Ron Del Barrio), expels him from the house. Standing at a payphone with nowhere to go, Ryan calls Sandy for help. As Sandy drives Ryan to his house in Newport Beach, the opening credits and the theme tune play—unlike the other episodes, there is no title sequence.

While Sandy tries to convince his wife, Kirsten (Kelly Rowan) to allow Ryan to stay in the pool house for a night, Ryan meets the girl next door, Marissa Cooper (Mischa Barton). When her boyfriend Luke (Chris Carmack) picks her up, Marissa invites Ryan to attend a fashion show fundraiser the following night. On a sailing trip the next day, the Cohens' son, Seth (Adam Brody) reveals to Ryan that he has a crush on Summer (Rachel Bilson) and would like to sail to Tahiti with her, but that she never pays him any attention. Later, Marissa leaves for the fashion show with her mother Julie (Melinda Clarke), her father Jimmy (Tate Donovan), and her younger sister Kaitlin (Shailene Woodley). The Cohens and Ryan also attend the show.

Summer invites Ryan to a party after the show, and Ryan convinces Seth to join him. For the first time, Seth is introduced to the sex-, drug-, and alcohol-fueled side of Newport. He experiences the wildness of a party for the first time, while Ryan flirts with Marissa. Luke takes a girl to the beach. Later at the party, Ryan rebuffs an intoxicated Summer, but Seth misinterprets the encounter and reveals Ryan's real background. Seth walks down the beach, and is bullied by a group of water polo players that includes Luke. Ryan defends Seth by punching Luke, but Luke's friends intervene and beat up Ryan and Seth. After returning to the Cohens, Ryan sees that Marissa's friends left her passed out on her drive; he carries her to the Cohens' pool house to sleep. When Kirsten finds Seth and Ryan asleep in the pool house the next morning, she is unhappy with Ryan's new influence and insists to Sandy that Ryan leave. Sandy drives Ryan back to Chino, but when they find his home empty, they return to Newport.

== Production ==
=== Conception ===
In 2002, Schwartz met with Joseph "McG" McGinty Nichol and Stephanie Savage of production company Wonderland Sound and Vision. They told Schwartz they wanted to create a television show based in McG's hometown of Newport Beach. Savage suggested producing a police or extreme sports 21 Jump Street-style show, but Schwartz knew little about the genre. Having had experience with people from Newport Beach during his time at the University of Southern California, Schwartz came back to them with his own characters. The show was pitched to Fox and Warner Bros in August 2002. Fox targeted a summer launch for the show, and Doug Liman was brought in to direct the premiere after McG withdrew due his scheduling conflicts with Charlie's Angels: Full Throttle. The show was confirmed for the 2003–2004 schedule in May, and an August 5, 2003 broadcast date was selected in June.

=== Casting ===
"When Benjamin [McKenzie] came in, he wasn't physically what Josh had envisioned, but he inhabited the character unlike anyone we had seen. I think that the character of Ryan is a kid that always seems a little lost and has a sense of mystery and danger; Benjamin has all those qualities."
— Patrick J. Rush on the casting of Benjamin McKenzie as Ryan.

Casting directors Patrick J. Rush and Alyson Silverberg began casting the main roles eight to ten weeks before filming began, with input from Schwartz, McG and Savage. Rush and Silverberg were later nominated in the Dramatic Pilot category of the Casting Society of America's Artios Awards.

In February 2003, Peter Gallagher became the first actor cast, playing Sandy Cohen. Kelly Rowan auditioned five times before being cast as Sandy's wife, Kirsten, in March 2003. Rush found the role of Ryan Atwood particularly hard to cast, as the producers wanted the "perfect" actor. Benjamin McKenzie was only invited to audition for the role after Warner Bros. made them aware of the actor following his unsuccessful audition for a UPN sitcom. McKenzie joined the cast in March 2003. He lacked working experience and later described his selection as "a tremendous leap of faith" on the producers' part. The role of Seth Cohen was derived from Schwartz's experiences at the University of Southern California as a "neurotic Jewish kid from the East Coast in a land of water polo players". Adam Brody first read for the part of Ryan, but found the bad-boy image did not suit him. In a recall for the role of Seth, Brody lost the producers' interest by ad-libbing much of the script; he joined the cast in March 2003 after a second interview.

Mischa Barton, who had met McG on Fastlane, portrayed Marissa Cooper. She was cast in February 2003. Tate Donovan, who played Jimmy Cooper, was cast in March 2003. Melinda Clarke guest-starred as Julie Cooper, but read for the role of Kirsten in her audition as there were not enough scripted lines for Julie at the time. Rachel Bilson, who was recommended to Schwartz after an unsuccessful audition for Everwood, guest-starred as Summer Roberts, whom the producers had envisaged as a tall Californian blonde. Clarke and Bilson joined as regular cast members later in the season. Chris Carmack, who played Luke Ward, was credited as a guest star for the episode; he joined the regular cast in the next episode.

=== Filming ===
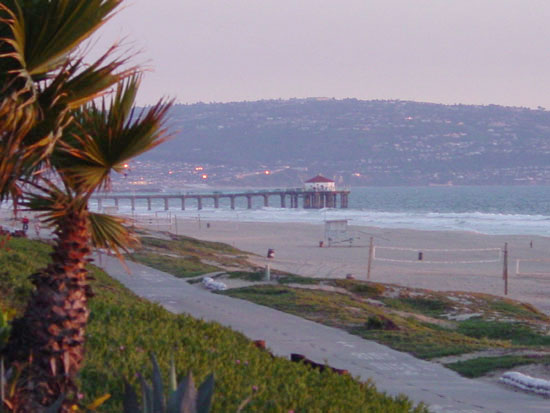
Manhattan Beach, a primary filming location for the show

Although the show is set in Newport Beach, financial penalties imposed for filming outside the "Thirty Mile Zone" forced production to the Manhattan Beach, Los Angeles County region. The scenes set in Ryan's hometown of Chino were filmed in Los Angeles. The show was predominantly shot on 35 mm film stock. Unusually for the show, a scene in the Atwood home in Chino was shot using a hand-held camera by Liman. Savage said this ensured the show "doesn't feel like glossy soap opera".

The Cohen family home was shot on location in Malibu. A mock pool house was built for use in the pilot, and taken down after filming completed. The Cohen's home was recreated on a soundstage at Raleigh Studios in Manhattan Beach for filming during the rest of the series; external shots of the house remained in use. The fashion show was filmed at the Wilshire Ebell Theatre; though it did not advance the story, Schwartz described it as necessary to show the world in which the characters lived. The party at Holly's beach house following the fashion show was filmed at a beach house in Malibu over three consecutive nights.

== Broadcast and distribution ==
The episode premiered at 9:00 p.m. (EDT) on August 5, 2003 on Fox, and was simulcast in Canada on CTV. Fox gave the show an early summer premiere to try to establish an audience before the network switched to coverage of post-season baseball in October, and ahead of "the clutter of the fall preview weeks". In the United Kingdom, the episode first aired at 9:00 p.m. (GMT) on March 7, 2004 on Channel 4, and in Australia on the Nine Network. The episode was released on MiniDVD on April 26, 2005, after release plans with other Warner Bros. titles for March were discarded. Although the premiere was originally broadcast and released in a 1.33:1 aspect ratio, it was remastered in a widescreen ratio for the Region 1 complete series DVD release. The Region 2 release retained the original aspect ratio. The episode is available on video on demand service Amazon Unbox in the United States, and from the iTunes Store in the United States and United Kingdom.

== Reception ==
"The clothes were hot, the music was cool, the scenery was gorgeous, the writing was snappy and smart and the characters were well-defined as we found out everything we needed to know in that first episode."

— Angela Henderson, of The Herald-Dispatch.

The pilot episode attracted 7.46 million viewers in the United States, second in its time slot behind the season finale of Last Comic Standing. The O.C. received a rating/share (Note: A rating/share represents the percentage of all television households tuned into a program, and the proportion of the television audience viewing a particular show, respectively.) of 6.8/11 in the first half-hour, ranking first between 9 and 9:30 p.m., but lost the lead in the second half-hour with a rating of 6.7/10. The episode received the highest rating of the night in the 12- to 17-year-old demographic, but in its target audience demographic of 18- to 49-year-olds, it received a less-than-expected Nielsen Rating of 2.9/8. The show built on the audience of lead-in show American Juniors, and Fox said that they were "fairly happy with the show's performance". Schwartz received a Writers Guild of America Award nomination for Best Screenplay in an Episodic Drama, with casting directors Rush and Silverberg nominated in the Dramatic Pilot category of the Artios Awards. The episode was criticized by City Manager Glen Rojas for its "negative portrayal" of Chino.

Entertainment Weekly's Carina Chocano praised The O.C. for being different, claiming that it was "refreshingly free of both [Aaron] Spelling-style camp and the twee earnestness that has characterized more recent teen dramas". Robert Bianco of USA Today drew comparisons with the successful Fox show Beverly Hills, 90210, saying that "The O.C. is better-written and better-acted by a cast that just might be, incredibly enough, even better-looking". He praised the cast's skill and attractiveness as well as the show's ability to "come up with a few smart deviations from the genre norm". Nancy Franklin of The New Yorker criticized the plot for being too predictable, but praised Adam Brody as Seth, stating that "he talks too much and too fast, he mumbles, and he projects zero physical confidence. In short, his character is adorable." Rob Owen of the Pittsburgh Post-Gazette felt that "[Benjamin] McKenzie, at times, is prone to overdramatizing scenes", and considered the young characters "so detestable and yet bland" that it made the show "almost painful" to watch. He nevertheless affirmed that the show had "positive attributes" that made it enjoyable. Andrew Grossman of The Boston Globe commented that "Brody is instantly likable as Seth" and that Barton "does a nice job with Marissa's torn-between-two-worlds angst", but stated that Ryan "doesn't seem to have many clear personality traits". Tim Goodman of the San Francisco Chronicle called the episode "superb" and described McKenzie as "essentially playing James Dean". He compared the actor to Russell Crowe and noted that McKenzie "pull[ed] the whole thing off with aplomb".

== Popular culture ==
Luke's line, "Welcome to the O.C., bitch", which he says after beating up Ryan, became a tagline for the show. TV Land placed the line as 83rd in its 100 Greatest TV Quotes and Catchphrases in 2006. Hadley Freeman of The Guardian noted that the teen-focused show made many cultural references due to a "renewed interest in the teen market", adding that the use of cropped tops, micro-minis, and beaded flip-flops showed a "decidedly West Coast approach to fashion". The episode's cultural references to fashion included Julie Cooper's question to her pre-pubescent daughter, "Do you like my hair this straight or is it too Avril Lavigne?", while another mother complains, "What are you doing putting my daughter in Calvin Klein? She was supposed to be in Vera Wang!" Teenage misfit Seth complains that "Every day's a fashion show for these kids".

The episode generated interest in the program's music and was regarded as "the show to be heard on". Michael Peck from TV Guide said that he received a large quantity of mail that inquired about the song "Into Dust" by Mazzy Star, which played when Ryan carried Marissa into his bedroom. Other featured music was The All-American Rejects' 2003 hit, "Swing, Swing", and "Hands Up" by The Black Eyed Peas from their 2003 multi-platinum album, Elephunk. Among Schwartz's favorite musical moments from the show was Joseph Arthur's "Honey and the Moon", which Schwartz claimed helped him write the pilot. The title track "California" introduced the band Phantom Planet into the mainstream.
