= The O.C. season 4 =

The O.C.
- Season 4
- DVD cover
- No. of episodes: 16

Release
- Original network: Fox
- Original release: November 2, 2006 – February 22, 2007

Season chronology
- ← Previous; Season 3

The fourth and final season of The O.C., an American teen drama television series, aired in the United States from November 2, 2006, to February 22, 2007, and consisted of 16 episodes. The O.C.'s final season aired Thursdays at 9:00 p.m. ET in the United States on Fox, a terrestrial television network. Fox tested a new timeslot by airing the second episode on Wednesday at 9:00 p.m. ET against ABC's Lost and CBS's Criminal Minds. With Lost about to enter a three-month hiatus, Fox hoped that changing the timeslot for The O.C. would attract back viewers it had lost since the end of the previous season; however, the move was unsuccessful and the show returned to its Thursday timeslot.

The season was released on DVD as a five-disc boxed set under the title The O.C.: The Complete Fourth Season on May 22, 2007, by Warner Home Video. The season was also made available in the American versions of Zune and iTunes Store. Before the season premiered on television, it was available through on demand streaming. In the US, streaming was available from October 26, 2006, at 3:01 a.m. ET onwards, through Fox Interactive Media's MySpace and MyFoxLocal stations.

In Canada, the fourth season was simulcast on the terrestrial CTV Television Network. Additionally, as a result of an agreement between Warner Bros. Television and CTV, the first episode was available to be streamed from October 30, 2006, at 12:00 p.m. ET onwards, through the CTV Broadband Network. In the United Kingdom the season premiered on January 9, 2007, on E4, and in Australia it was broadcast by Network Ten on November 7, 2006, at 8:30 p.m. (local time).

== Synopsis ==
Life after high school hasn't been great for the graduates of Harbor high. Ryan, Julie, and Summer have trouble adjusting to life without Marissa. Taylor ran into some trouble. Back in Newport for her Junior year, Kaitlin continues to act out. Sandy and Kirsten face a major bombshell that gets put in their lap or in the oven. Seth tries to find his calling. Ryan gets an unexpected visitor who helps Julie out of her grief.

== Cast and characters ==
=== Regular ===
- Peter Gallagher as Sandy Cohen (16 episodes)
- Kelly Rowan as Kirsten Cohen (16 episodes)
- Benjamin McKenzie as Ryan Atwood (16 episodes)
- Adam Brody as Seth Cohen (16 episodes)
- Melinda Clarke as Julie Cooper (16 episodes)
- Rachel Bilson as Summer Roberts (16 episodes)
- Autumn Reeser as Taylor Townsend (16 episodes)
- Willa Holland as Kaitlin Cooper (16 episodes)

=== Recurring ===
- Wayne Dalglish as Brad Ward (10 episodes)
- Corey Price as Eric Ward (10 episodes)
- Chris Pratt as Che (9 episodes)
- Kevin Sorbo as Frank Atwood (7 episodes)
- Gary Grubbs as Gordan Bullit (6 episodes)
- Brandon Quinn as Spencer Bullit (6 episodes)
- Scott Krinsky as Darryl (5 episodes)
- Michael Nouri as Neil Roberts (3 episodes)

=== Special guest starring ===
- Chris Brown as Will Tutt (3 episodes)
- Tate Donovan as Jimmy Cooper (1 episode)

== Episodes ==
No. overall	No. in season	Title	Directed by	Written by	Original release date	Prod. code	U.S. viewers (millions)
77	1	"The Avengers"	Ian Toynton	Josh Schwartz & Stephanie Savage	November 2, 2006	3T5251	3.39
Nearly six months have passed. Marissa's friends and family have trouble moving on. Meanwhile, Taylor has convinced everyone she's in France.
78	2	"The Gringos"	Patrick Norris	John Stephens	November 7, 2006^{†}	3T5252	3.54
Ryan and Seth take a trip down to Mexico to find Volchok. Taylor confesses why she's not in France. Kaitlin's reckless behavior results in Julie volunteering at Harbor's clothing drive.
79	3	"The Cold Turkey"	Michael Lange	J. J. Philbin	November 9, 2006	3T5253	3.73
Volchok turns to Sandy for advice without Ryan's knowledge. Summer prepares to face life in Newport as she returns from Brown. Meanwhile, Julie finds herself alone on Thanksgiving when she is not welcome in the Cohens' house.
80	4	"The Metamorphosis"	Norman Buckley	Leila Gerstein	November 16, 2006	3T5254	3.77
Summer realizes her new personality is just a new way of coping with Marissa's death, and Seth continues to support her. Ryan helps Taylor legalize her divorce. Meanwhile, Julie and Kaitlin attempt to stay out of trouble.
81	5	"The Sleeping Beauty"	Ian Toynton	John Stephens	November 30, 2006	3T5255	3.67
Taylor finds a new way to get closer to Ryan but ends up turning to Kaitlin for support. Summer and Che take their activism to a new level, but suffer severely. Meanwhile, Julie fights for the affection of Kaitlin's new tennis instructor, and Kirsten seeks additional funding for NewMatch.
82	6	"The Summer Bummer"	Michael Lange	Josh Schwartz & Stephanie Savage	December 7, 2006	3T5256	3.82
Seth visits Summer at Brown but runs into Che. Sandy and Kirsten try to find an opportunity to bond with Ryan. Kaitlin attempts to gain Harbor recognition by throwing a party. Meanwhile, Julie learns NewMatch is no longer just a dating service.
83	7	"The Chrismukk-huh?"	Ian Toynton	J. J. Philbin & John Stephens	December 14, 2006	3T5257	4.25
Ryan and Taylor fall off a ladder and end up in the hospital. Taylor confronts Veronica about her attitude. Meanwhile, a letter from Marissa is sent to the Cohen house.
84	8	"The Earth Girls Are Easy"	Norman Buckley	Mark Fish	December 21, 2006	3T5258	4.15
Ryan plans a surprise trip for Taylor, but Seth comes along and brings Summer, whose future is at stake. Meanwhile, Bullit gets an old friend to take care of Julie's accounting, much to her displeasure and Sandy's suspicion.
85	9	"The My Two Dads"	Michael Schultz	Josh Schwartz & Stephanie Savage	January 4, 2007	3T5259	3.93
Kaitlin fails a class presentation and is forced to work with a smart classmate, whom she ends up liking. Seth and Summer move forward with their plans, regardless of how they really feel. Sandy confronts Frank about why he's in Newport.
86	10	"The French Connection"	John Stephens	J. J. Philbin	January 11, 2007	3T5260	3.83
Ryan learns about Taylor's summer in France. Seth seeks Dr. Roberts' permission to marry Summer. Kaitlin realizes she likes Will. Summer reconnects with Holly and worries about her future. Meanwhile, Kirsten makes a shocking discovery at NewMatch.
87	11	"The Dream Lover"	Patrick Norris	Leila Gerstein	January 18, 2007	3T5261	3.96
Che brings Seth on a trip to the forest. Taylor decides she should no longer see Ryan. Julie begs for Kirsten's reconciliation. Kaitlin shuts Will out of her life.
88	12	"The Groundhog Day"	Ian Toynton	Mark Fish	January 25, 2007	3T5262	3.57
Ryan tries to act like he doesn't miss Taylor, who is seeing a therapist. Kirsten's turning 40 but has her mind focused on other things. Julie is having an affair that Kaitlin does all she can to stop. Che makes a discovery about Seth.
89	13	"The Case of the Franks"	Norman Buckley	J. J. Philbin	February 1, 2007	3T5263	3.82
Ryan and Taylor devise a plan to bring Julie and Frank closer, but Kaitlin tries to keep Bullit in Julie's personal life. Summer begins to have doubts in her relationship with Seth. Kirsten opens up about her past with Jimmy to Sandy as they prepare for their new baby.
90	14	"The Shake Up"	Ian Toynton	John Stephens	February 8, 2007	3T5264	3.58
Kaitlin does all she can to sabotage Julie and Frank's relationship. Ryan and Taylor tell each other how they feel. Summer encourages Seth to find something he's passionate about. Kirsten realizes what Newport's society is all about. As the night comes to a close, an earthquake hits Newport Beach.
91	15	"The Night Moves"	Patrick Norris	Stephanie Savage	February 15, 2007	3T5265	3.65
After the earthquake, Ryan tells Seth he needs to get to the hospital, but doesn't want to worry Taylor. An aftershock leaves Kirsten wondering if her unborn baby is still alive. Taylor takes control when she and Summer hear an intruder in their home. Kaitlin and Julie are trapped in an ice cream store.
92	16	"The End's Not Near, It's Here"	Ian Toynton	Josh Schwartz	February 22, 2007	3T5266	6.59
Ever since the earthquake destroyed their home, the Cohens have taken temporary residence at the Roberts' home. Sandy and Kirsten search for a new home. Summer must choose between touring with GEORGE or her future with Seth. Taylor and Ryan determine their future together. Julie must decide whether to marry Frank or Bullit. Before Ryan leaves Newport, as he turns out of the driveway, he remembers the first time he met Marissa. Years later, Ryan is attending Berkeley. Julie graduates from college with Kaitlin, Frank, Bullit and her son applauding her achievement. Sandy is now teaching law classes. Seth and Summer get married, with Ryan and Taylor as their best man and maid of honor and Sophie Rose Cohen as their flower girl. Ryan, as an architect, reaches out to a young boy, much in the way Sandy reached out to him years ago.

=== Notes ===
^† - The second episode was shown first in Canada on Tuesday, November 7 at 8:00 p.m. ET on CTV. In the United States the episode aired the next day at 9:00 p.m. ET.

== Crew ==
The season was produced by Warner Bros. Television, College Hill Pictures and Wonderland Sound and Vision. The executive producers were Bob DeLaurentis, creator Josh Schwartz and Wonderland co-founders McG and Stephanie Savage. Ian Toynton and John Stephens served as co-executive producers. The staff writers were Schwartz, Savage, Stephens, J.J. Philbin, Leila Gerstein and Mark Fish. The regular directors throughout the season were Toynton, Michael Lange, Norman Buckley and Patrick Norris.

== Cast ==
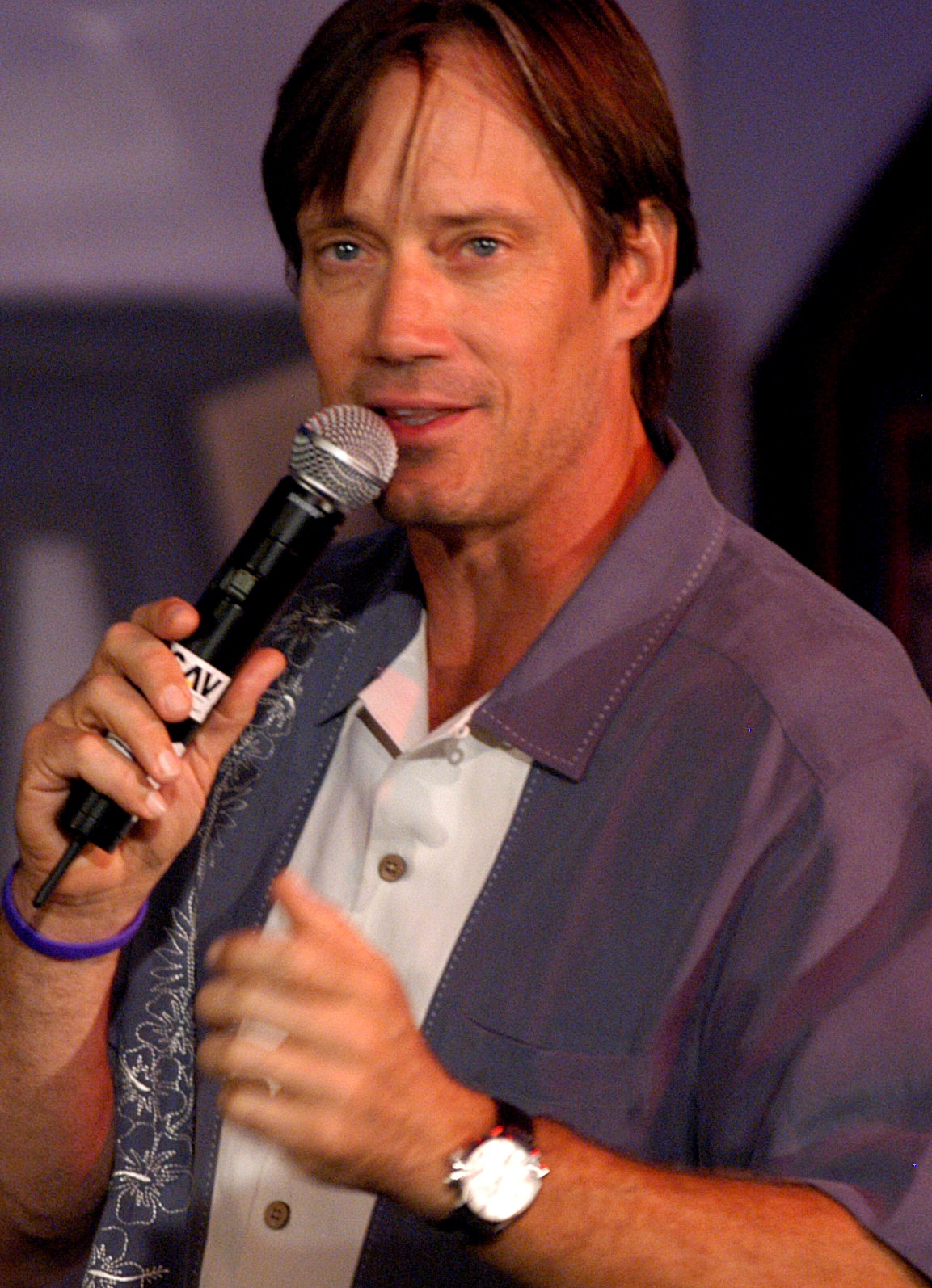
Kevin Sorbo joined the cast as Frank Atwood.

The fourth season had star billing for eight major roles. Rachel Bilson as Summer, Adam Brody as Seth, Melinda Clarke as Julie, Peter Gallagher as Sandy, Benjamin McKenzie as Ryan, and Kelly Rowan as Kirsten all returned to the main cast. Former main cast member Mischa Barton did not return because her character, Marissa, died in the third season finale. Autumn Reeser as recent high school graduate Taylor Townsend, and Willa Holland as Marissa's younger sister Kaitlin both joined the main cast, having previously held recurring roles. Other cast members returning in recurring roles include Cam Gigandet as Volchok, Erin Foster as Heather, Michael Nouri as Summer's father Dr. Neil Roberts, Paula Trickey as Taylor's mother Veronica, and Ashley Hartman who starred as Holly Fischer in the first season. Additionally former main cast member Tate Donovan returned as Jimmy Cooper in a non-canonical appearance.

Actors who left the cast include Ryan Donowho (Johnny), Jeri Ryan (Charlotte), Shaun Duke (Henry Griffin), Kayla Ewell (Casey), and Nikki Reed (Sadie). New members who joined the cast include Kevin Sorbo as Ryan's father Frank; Gary Grubbs as an oil merchant who calls himself The Bullit; Brandon Quinn as Bullit's son Spencer; Chris Pratt as an environmental activist nicknamed Che; and Wayne Dalglish and Corey Price as Luke Ward's younger twin brothers Brad and Eric. New guest stars who joined in recurring roles include Tia Carrere as Dean Torres, singer Chris Brown as lonely band geek Will Tutt, Henri Lubatti as Taylor's ex-husband Henri-Michel de Momourant, and Steve-O in a cameo role as an unnamed marine.

== Reception ==
While ratings were lower than those of the third season, the final season is generally regarded by fans and critics as an improvement on the third. Variety's Josef Adalian said that "[the show] is once again in great creative shape". He added that "the scripts are snappy, the plots make sense, the acting's solid, [and] the music is appropriately indie" but criticized Fox for "throwing away" the show by giving it the Thursday 9:00 p.m. timeslot. The difficult timeslot Adalian was referring to was against two other very popular shows, CSI and Grey's Anatomy. With a later start to the season in November the premiere attracted 3.4 million viewers, which was a series low and marked a 55 percent decrease in the 18–49 demographic, from the third season premiere. The first half of the season averaged 4.06 million viewers, with the season as a whole averaging 4.6 million viewers. This increase was mostly due to 6.7 million viewers, 76 percent more than the season average, tuning in to see the final ever installment of The O.C.

Due to a combination of low ratings and the death of Marissa in season three, it was rumored that the show would not return for a fifth season. In June 2006, Fox confirmed that "the current order for The O.C. is 16 episodes", but added that there was a chance to add more installments. In September 2006, Rachel Bilson said that she felt "like the show is over", and co-star Kelly Rowan stated that many of the cast realized the show was close to being cancelled. Rowan said that "when [the fourth season] was picked up for just 16 episodes this year the cast had a feeling the end was near". On January 3, 2007, Fox announced that The O.C. was to be cancelled. In a statement, Schwartz said "This feels like the best time to bring the show to its close" adding that "what better time to go out than creatively on top". A campaign was launched to save the show and over half a million people signed an official petition at www.fox.com/oc/savetheoc. There were rumors that the show would be saved, and a move to The CW was mooted; however, The CW president Dawn Ostroff, whose company is partly owned by Warner Bros, confirmed in January 2007 that while the move was discussed, it was decided against.

Schwartz said that the cancellation of the show "was really creatively liberating, not worrying about ratings." Belinda Acosta of The Austin Chronicle agreed praising the show's "new energy" and its ability to successfully cover "the transition between high school and college that other series have stumbled over". Entertainment Weekly's Ken Tucker commented that the fourth season was "a succession of terrific subplots" and praised new main cast member Taylor "as a fine, funny love interest for Ryan". Greg Elwell of DVD Talk described Bullit as "the breakout character of the season" but commented that the seasons "dark opening (...) didn't do much to keep viewers around". IGN's Eric Goldman was also critical saying that "as amusing as Che was, his inclusion into some later episodes gets a bit tired". Goldman also commented that "the second half of Season 4 wasn't quite as solid as the first [half]"; however, he added that while the fourth season had to prove itself again as an enjoyable watch "Josh Schwartz rose to this challenge (...) once again creating a show that was witty and self-aware".

== DVD release ==
The DVD release of season four was released by Warner Bros. in the US on 22 May 2007 after it had completed broadcast on television. As well as every episode from the season, the DVD release features bonus material including unaired scenes, featurettes, and audio commentary on the series finale.

The O.C. - The Complete Fourth Season
Set details		Special features	
16 episodes; 5-disc set; Running Time: (Region 1) 672 minutes; (Region 2) 645 minutes; (Region 4) 667 minutes; 1.78:1 aspect ratio; English (Dolby Surround 2.0); Subtitles: English, French, Spanish		Audio Commentary: "The End's Not Near, It's Here"; Unaired scenes; Featurettes: The Magic That Is Chrismukkah; Summer Roberts - Beauty Meets Brown	
Release dates
United States	Canada	United Kingdom	Australia
May 22, 2007		May 28, 2007	July 4, 2007
