= Seth Cohen =

- The O.C. character
- Adam Brody as Seth Cohen
- First appearance: "Premiere" (episode 1.01)
- Last appearance: "The End's Not Near, It's Here" (episode 4.16)
- Created by: Josh Schwartz
- Portrayed by: Adam Brody; Tristan Price (flashbacks)

In-universe information
- Full name: Seth Ezekiel Cohen
- Nicknames: Cohen (by Summer, Zach, Luke); Sethelah (by the Nana); Sethy (by Sandy)
- Gender: Male
- Occupation: Comic book artist High school student (at the Harbor School; graduated); College student (at RISD; graduated)
- Family: Sanford "Sandy" Cohen (father); Kirsten Cohen (mother); Sophie Rose Cohen (younger sister); Ryan Atwood (adoptive brother); Sophie Cohen (paternal grandmother); Caleb Nichol (maternal grandfather; deceased); Rose Nichol (maternal grandmother; deceased); Hailey Nichol (maternal aunt); Lindsay Gardner (maternal half-aunt)
- Spouse: Summer Roberts
- Significant others: Anna Stern (ex-girlfriend); Alex Kelly (ex-girlfriend)
- Relatives: Neil Roberts (father-in-law)
- Residence: Newport Beach, California

Seth Ezekiel Cohen is a fictional character on the Fox television series The O.C., portrayed by Adam Brody. Seth is one of the "core four" characters on The O.C. alongside Ryan Atwood, Marissa Cooper, and Summer Roberts. Seth's friendship with Ryan, who eventually became his adoptive brother, formed a focal point of the series along with their romances. Seth married Summer in the series finale. His other relationships were with Anna Stern and Alex Kelly. Seth's goal was to attend Brown University, but he ends up going to Rhode Island School of Design (RISD) and continuing work on his comic book Atomic County. The role saw Brody win four Teen Choice Awards from five nominations, from 2004 to 2006.

== Character development ==
=== Casting and creation ===
Brody did not immediately get the part of Seth Cohen after his first audition because he improvised the dialogue. However, the producers called him back a month later for another test, and he was cast in March 2003. Schwartz said about Brody that he is "naturally talented, a funny guy, and has a Point of View on the world (and an initial perspective on Seth) that made him feel very specific, and had a little attitude." The character is based on Schwartz, who said: "The dynamic between Sandy and Seth is very much based on me and my dad. It was as much Seth's choice not to fit in, as it was the Water Polo players rejecting him, and a lot of that came from Brody, as well as a love for Death Cab for Cutie.

=== Characterization ===
Carina Chocano of Entertainment Weekly described Seth as "a nuanced portrait of a true-to-life dork [whose] relationship to Ryan is full of nice little ironies." The New York Times characterized him as "eccentric and literate" while the show's website compared him to Holden Caulfield for being an existential hero. He has also been described as "gawky".

Seth is very sarcastic and uses irony to find the humor in the events that occur around him. He is shown throughout the series to be self-obsessed and neurotic, with a tendency to make himself the center of attention. However, in many episodes, he proves to be a sweet and genuine guy with good intentions and a good heart, and this is often overlooked by others. He is a self-proclaimed geek and likes comic books, science fiction, video games, and old movies.

At school, prior to Ryan's arrival, he was routinely bullied by the jocks (namely, the water polo players), who would intentionally urinate on his shoes and slam him into the lockers. If not bullied, he was largely ignored by his other peers; Summer treated him with disdain, calling him "Death Breath Seth," while Marissa, who lived next door since they were in elementary school, did not speak to him until after Ryan's arrival. He would go out on his sailboat, the Summer Breeze, to escape Newport; in Season 2 he admitted to Ryan that he sold it for cash while docked at Santa Barbara and caught a Greyhound to Portland. Besides his awkwardness, his naivety in social norms and relationships contributes to his propensity to draw trouble to himself and not realizing until it's too late, a running gag in the show; for example, he has to be physically stopped by both Zach Stevens and Ryan when he tries to call his crush Alex Kelly even after she hinted for him to stay away because her ex is in town. He quickly forms a friendship with Ryan as the latter was the first person who befriended him without any preconceived notions and without judging him.

Seth was further designed as an artist in the second season. Plans of him drawing comics started at the end of the first season when executive producer Alan Heinberg impressed by Eric Wight's work asked him to be the "ghost artist". Wight, who said he easily related to Seth, first made sketches of the four main superheroes, and the rest came later as the episodes were being developed.

== Character arc ==
=== Season 1 ===
Seth Cohen was born in Berkeley, California, to parents Sanford "Sandy" Cohen and Kirsten Cohen. Raised in Newport Beach, he is Jewish on his father's side and connects and identifies with his father's religious and cultural background. However, he embraces the mutual holiday of Chrismukkah, a joint Christmas and Hanukkah holiday. He was befriended by Ryan Atwood (Benjamin McKenzie) when the latter was brought home by Sandy. Before Ryan's arrival, Seth was ignored by most of his peers due to his awkward nature and unusual hobbies. They quickly strike a friendship as Ryan did not judge him like other "Newpsies" and Seth was the first to accept Ryan as a member of the household without any reservations. Soon after Ryan's arrival, Seth became friends with Marissa Cooper (Mischa Barton) and got the chance to speak to Summer Roberts (Rachel Bilson), a popular girl on whom he had a huge crush since childhood. The pair grew closer after they traveled to Tijuana together, despite Summer's denial of liking him. She quickly turned him down for a date after seeing a few cheerleaders eyeing the pair. After finally admitting she liked Seth, Summer grew jealous of Seth's friend Anna Stern (Samaire Armstrong), whom he met at a cotillion dance practice and he shared many interests with, including comics. They started dating after Seth decided in her favour during a contest for his affection between her and Summer. However, their relationship was short lived as they broke up when Seth made it obvious that he truly wanted Summer instead and had made the wrong choice. Anna soon left to go home to Pittsburgh, but she and Seth remained friends.

Though Summer and Seth started seeing each other and lost their virginity to each other, Summer still wanted their relationship to be secret. Seth refused to put up with this and declared his love for her atop a coffee cart in front of the school. Seth and Summer's relationship became official and continued until Seth's best and pretty much only friend Ryan Atwood announced he'd be returning to his home neighborhood, Chino, after his pregnant ex-girlfriend declared she wanted to keep the baby and raise it in her hometown. Seth tried to make Ryan stay and was distraught at his departure but tried to appear uninterested by it, although it pained him deeply. He couldn't face the idea of becoming a loner once more, and even though he still had Summer, he decided to sail the oceans for the summer in his boat, Summer Breeze, which was named after Summer. He left a note for her, and for his parents, who were distraught over losing both Seth and Ryan in one day.

=== Seasons 2 and 3 ===
Seth and Summer at their Junior Prom in "The O.Sea" (episode 2.23)

Early in season 2, Seth is staying with Luke Ward in Portland, Oregon and working at a kayak rental shack. He refuses to come home despite his parents' calls as he was still resentful of his parents for letting Ryan go back to Chino, forcing Sandy to ask Ryan to accompany him to Portland in hopes of persuading Seth to return. Once Seth returned, Summer had moved on with Zach Stevens (Michael Cassidy). After accepting the fact that his relationship with Summer was over, Seth started dating Alex Kelly (Olivia Wilde), a girl with whom he temporarily worked at The Bait Shop in Newport Beach. He attempts to impress her by putting on a "bad boy" image, even entertaining the idea of wearing one of Ryan's trademark wife-beaters to meet her and "stealing" his grandfather's Aston Martin. Their relationship was short-lived after he accidentally discovers her making out with Marissa (Alex is revealed to be bisexual). In the meantime, Seth and Zach became friends as they both had a passion for comics. They created a comic book together titled Atomic County revolving around four Orange County teenagers who have super powers which mirror the "core four". The tension came to a breaking point when Zach, Summer and Seth went on a trip to sell their comic book. Seth subtly admitted his feelings about Summer, who was about to leave on a trip to Italy with Zach a few weeks after, but Seth begged for her to be with him. She couldn't deny her feelings and left Zach for Seth at the airport, sealing the new relationship with a rainy kiss in the style of Spider-Man. Zach ultimately gave Summer up at prom, and Seth swooped in to again tell the school how he loved Summer when she was named Prom Queen. Summer admits to Seth that she loves him for his "little flaws and [his] little quirks". They stayed together and started to apply to colleges, deciding on Brown University, Seth's dream college, because "most importantly, it's 3,000 miles away". Summer decided that if she got into Brown and Seth didn't, she would not attend because she wanted to be with him. Summer got in and Seth did not, but he lied and told her he did because he didn't want her to pass up Brown, which led to their breakup. When he visited Brown, Seth came across Anna and she helped him get an interview for the Rhode Island School of Design (RISD). In the season finale, Seth surprised Summer with his acceptance to RISD for the spring semester, and they reunited. They happily graduated from high school, but things got difficult when Marissa died in a car accident.

=== Season 4 ===
As the story continued six months later, Seth worked at a comic-book store and had problems with Summer, who turned from materialistic gossip into a tree-hugging vegan (who later protested against poverty at a Thanksgiving meal at the Cohens) at college and would not answer his phone calls. He left long messages on her answering-machine. When they met in Newport, Summer acted cold towards him. After a visit from Taylor, Summer realized that she was isolating Seth because she couldn't deal with what was in Newport - the memory of Marissa. She visited home for Thanksgiving, and Seth confronted her with this concept, which she eventually accepted, telling him via voice mail as she left to return to Brown to deal with it on her own. Though Summer came to terms with Marissa's death through therapy and seemed to return to her old self, she and Seth quickly discovered that her tree-hugging ways had left a deep imprint. Seth supported her by stepping back and giving her space to pursue her new interests; however, this made Summer realize how important Seth was in her life and their relationship grew stronger. False pretenses led to Summer's semester-long suspension from Brown just as Seth was to start at RISD, but Seth decided he would put off college until the following fall so they could return to Providence together. On the eve of the New Year, a pregnancy scare caused Seth to ask for Summer's hand in marriage. Although the scare was false, plans for their marriage remained. Later, Summer backed out of the engagement, but they were still dating. Their relationship was again questioned when Summer was offered a job at GEORGE, the clothing line of Asda, while Seth had nothing set for him. When Newport was struck with an earthquake, they barely escape a collapsing streetlight and the Cohens, whose house was destroyed, cram together with Julie and Kaitlin Cooper at Summer's house. For the next six months, Seth was in limbo and Summer challenges him to find something he is passionate about and pursue it. She accepted the offer from GEORGE but promises to stay in contact. The series concluded four years later in "The End's Not Near, It's Here" with the couple getting married in a Jewish ceremony, with Ryan serving as best man.

== Reception ==
Upon the show's premiere, Gael Fashingbauer Cooper of MSNBC described Ryan and Seth's friendship as "the most promising plot".

At the start of the second season, The New York Times wrote that "the relationship between the men is the show's emotional centerpiece."

As of 2004, Seth was named one of the 10 best current characters by Zap2it, writing: "The gangly Adam Brody effortlessly delivers his hilarious and sweetly sarcastic lines. He's positively delightful and brings a level of humor not often seen on prime time soaps. Heck, even his wardrobe is a hoot."

In 2004, he was nominated for Choice Breakout Male TV Star and Choice TV Actor - Drama/Action Adventure, losing the former to Chad Michael Murray of One Tree Hill and winning the latter.

In 2005, he won two awards for Choice TV Actor - Drama/Action Adventure and Choice TV Chemistry with Rachel Bilson who played Summer Roberts.

In 2006, he won again the Teen Choice Award for Choice TV Actor - Drama/Action Adventure.

In 2009, he was voted the "Best Son" in Zap2it's first poll of the best television characters in the 2000s.

For his portrayal of Seth, Brody earned several Teen Choice Awards throughout the show's run.
