= Marissa Cooper =

Fictional character from The O.C.

- The O.C. character
- First appearance: "Premiere" (episode 1.01)
- Last appearance: "The Graduates" (episode 3.25)
- Created by: Josh Schwartz
- Portrayed by: Mischa Barton

In-universe information
- Nicknames: Coop (by Summer); Mariss (by Julie); Kiddo (by Jimmy)
- Occupation: High school student (at the Harbor School; graduated)
- Family: James "Jimmy" Cooper (father); Julie Cooper (mother); Caleb Nichol (stepfather; deceased); Kaitlin Cooper (younger sister); Cooper Atwood (maternal half-brother)
- Significant others: Luke Ward (ex-boyfriend); Ryan Atwood (ex-boyfriend); D.J. (ex-boyfriend); Alex Kelly (ex-girlfriend); Kevin Volchok (ex-boyfriend)
- Relatives: Cindy (maternal aunt)
- Residence: Newport Beach, California

Marissa Cooper is a fictional character on the FOX television series The O.C., portrayed by Mischa Barton. Marissa was among the original "core four" characters on The O.C. She is a privileged California native born into a wealthy family, residing next to the Cohen family's house. Throughout The O.C.'s storyline, Marissa is introduced to new characters who influence her perspective on life and her personality.

== Characterization ==
=== Personality ===
Marissa Cooper is characterized as the privileged yet troubled girl next door. Her designer-label-packed wardrobe masks her turbulent mood swings and hard-partying ways. Although Marissa is tall, thin and pretty, sadly, she is not much else. She is afforded all the privileges of a Newport Beach lifestyle, yet she fails to show any interest or engagement with the world around her. Like many of her peers, she is emotionally distant from her mother and becomes disillusioned with her mother's materialistic ways. As a result, she, like her sister Kaitlin, often rebelled against her mother. She is closer to her father, whom she stated was the "last thing keeping [her] sane" through the tumult of the first two seasons. Marissa was the social chair of The Harbor school. She organized the debutante ball rehearsals, school dances, carnivals, and other charity events. Simultaneously engaging in problematic romance and risky behavior, which in her case often go together.

Marissa's risky behavior was a factor in her on-off relationship with Ryan Atwood. For example, during Ryan's first Christmas in Newport Beach, he was furious to find her drunk due to his painful experiences as the child of alcoholic parents, but she did not understand his aversion to alcohol and thought that he was overreacting.

=== Storyline ===
Marissa is introduced as a wealthy, beautiful socialite in Newport Beach, California, whose family (mother Julie, father Jimmy, and younger sister Kaitlin) go through dramatic changes over the seasons. She is a troubled person before the series begins, with a history of substance abuse and rebellious behavior. This is evident from a scene in the pilot where she is left on her front door by her friends, passed out from drinking. The backstory on her friendship with Summer Roberts showcases it as a powerful bond, forged during second grade. One of her most profound connections, the friendship is a central element on the show for three seasons. The show significantly focuses on Marissa's on-and-off again relationship with Ryan Atwood.

=== Sexuality ===
Viewers of the series have debated Marissa's sexuality. When she hooked up with Alex Kelly, her heterosexual identity became the source of speculation. Fans questioned whether Marissa was bisexual or just bi-curious. The question became one of the top queries that viewers wanted The O.C. creator Josh Schwartz to answer.

Schwartz insisted that the relationship between Marissa and Alex was not a rating stunt and that Marissa developed real feelings for Alex. Sarah Warn of AfterEllen.com said that despite Schwartz's statements, "Marissa's predominantly heterosexual past, the huge fan support for the Marissa and Ryan (Benjamin McKenzie) pairing, and the controversy The O.C. would court by making one of its principal characters bisexual, it's likely that her 'real feelings' for Alex will only last a few episodes." Within the series, Marissa refers casually to Alex as her ex-girlfriend.

Marissa's sexual orientation, other than her known heterosexual identity, was never confirmed by the series, and was reported to be "Marissa just experimenting with the fairer sex and not committing to a full-on romantic, sapphic relationship." The executives did, however, cite her relationship with Alex as an important one, and one that was successful with viewers.

Schwartz said that the network was "nervous" about the storyline and wanted it "wrapped up as fast as humanly possible and Alex moving on out of the OC."

=== Character's exit ===
The decision to kill Barton's character came from the producers. Josh Schwartz relays that it was entirely a creative decision: "It had as much to do with creatively feeling like this was always in the cards for this character and she was an inherently tragic heroine, and part of the Ryan/Marissa story was him trying to save her from a fate that she couldn't be rescued from." Commenting on her character's death, Barton said: "My character has been through so, so much and there's really nothing more left for her to do." She added, "I was really excited that I get to die, to be honest. [...] It was better than one of those lame farewells."

== Character arc ==
=== Season 1 ===
Marissa's father is caught committing fraud and eventually files for bankruptcy. The first episode sees sparks from between Marissa and Ryan Atwood. "Who are you?" asks Marissa. "Whoever you want me to be," replies Ryan. Luke Ward, Marissa's long-term boyfriend, shows animosity towards Ryan from the moment he steps foot into Orange County. Soon after, on vacation in Tijuana with Ryan, Seth Cohen and best friend Summer Roberts, Marissa discovers that her parents are separating. In the aftermath, she catches Luke cheating on her with one of her best friends, Holly Fischer. Marissa then separates from her friends and overdoses on painkillers. Ryan finds her unconscious in an alleyway in Tijuana and summons help just in time. After this, Marissa battles with her mother, who wants to send her to rehab. She eventually gets through to Julie but has to agree to see a therapist in Newport Beach after she is caught shoplifting. She meets Oliver Trask during her first session, and they soon become good friends, much to Ryan's displeasure.

Throughout the first season, Marissa is involved in an on-again, off-again relationship with Ryan, with the relationship jeopardized by Luke and Oliver. Oliver is initially discovered by Ryan to be mentally unstable and harboring an unhealthy obsession for Marissa. Ryan and Marissa break up because of his interference. Oliver is arrested after he keeps Marissa as a hostage and threatens to kill himself if she does not leave Ryan for good. After Oliver's arrest, Marissa attempts reuniting with Ryan, he refuses and they remain friends.

During this time, her mother is romantically involved with Kirsten Cohen's father, Caleb Nichol. During a brief breakup with Caleb, Marissa's mother has a fling with Luke, which causes Marissa to run away to Chino, California, to Ryan's ex-girlfriend Theresa Diaz's house. This leads to Ryan and Marissa again becoming romantically involved. Marissa uses the affair between Julie and Luke as blackmail to get out of counseling or living with her mother because Julie does not want anyone to find out.

Marissa and Ryan's relationship is strained once more when Theresa comes to Newport Beach towards the end of the season after suffering domestic abuse from her boyfriend Eddie. Theresa reveals to Marissa that she is pregnant and does not know whether the baby's father is Ryan or Eddie. In the season finale, Ryan leaves Marissa to move back to Chino and help Theresa raise the baby. Marissa moves into Caleb Nichol's home after he and her mother marry in the season finale. Marissa's grief over Ryan's departure makes her turn back to alcohol.

=== Season 2 ===
During the second season, Marissa struggles with alcohol and depression, caused largely by Ryan's departure from her life. When Ryan returns, it looks as though they may have rekindled their relationship, but after finding out about her relationship with D.J., the "yard guy," Ryan decides that they should just be friends, which they remain throughout most of the season. Marissa's relationships in the interim period seem somewhat specifically chosen to take stabs at her mother—first with D.J. and then a lesbian romance with Alex Kelly. Her relationship with her parents sinks to an all-time low when she discovers that they were back together again. At Jimmy's farewell party, she confronts her parents in public and loudly calls Julie a whore and herself "the daughter of a thief and a slut."

Towards the end of the season, Marissa gets back together with Ryan and becomes friends with his brother, Trey, who was recently let out of jail. After Trey snorts cocaine, he tries to rape Marissa. Marissa does not want to tell Ryan because she did not want him to worry, and Trey does not want her to tell him because he and Ryan were getting along again. Marissa breaks down and tells Summer, who tells Seth. Seth is initially reluctant to tell his foster brother, knowing Ryan's volatile temperament and tendency to physically lash out when it comes to people he cared about. When Ryan finds out, he and Trey get into a fist fight at Trey's apartment. Trey was on the verge of killing Ryan when Marissa arrives. The scene ends with Marissa shooting Trey in order to save Ryan, who is pinned on the floor.

=== Season 3 ===
As the series' third season opens, Marissa is under investigation regarding the shooting of Trey Atwood, who is in a coma as a result of the wound. When he awakens, Julie threatens to smother Trey if he does not tell the authority that Ryan shot him, in order to keep Marissa out of trouble. Marissa finds out and convinces Trey to tell the truth. Ryan is let free, and Marissa faces no legal liability as she was defending another person's life using proportional force in the circumstances.

Despite a lack of legal repercussions, the event results in Marissa's expulsion from the prestigious Harbor School, as it is cited along with her past of flagrant shoplifting and substance abuse. Following her expulsion, she attends the local public school Newport Union and has difficulty fitting in. She befriends one of her schoolmates, a local surfer named Johnny Harper. Johnny causes rifts in her relationship with Ryan, who ironically befriends Johnny due to their similar backgrounds, initially because Marissa feels she cannot talk to Ryan about what happened with Trey and later because Johnny falls in love with her. She is readmitted to Harbor after a campaign led by Ryan, Seth, Summer, and Marissa's former rival for power at Harbor, Taylor Townsend. Marissa confirms her commitment to Ryan and writes Johnny a letter saying that while he is her friend and she cares for him, she will never love him. This results in Johnny falling to his death from a cliff after a drinking binge, and the tragedy causes Ryan and Marissa's final breakup.

In the wake of Johnny's death, Marissa struggles to find closure, as well as her own place and purpose in Newport Beach. She develops a relationship with Kevin Volchok after she and Ryan break up, which causes her to go back to her rebellious ways. She begins to abuse alcohol again and tries cocaine. Marissa distances herself from Ryan, Summer, and Seth and becomes argumentative again with her mother. After some time, she comes to her senses and decides to leave Kevin. But when she finds him watching The Sound of Music, she realizes he has a sensitive side and decides she may be able to have a relationship with him. During their senior prom, though, she catches him cheating on her and breaks things off.

In the season finale, Marissa receives a letter from her father inviting her to live for a year on a boat with him in Greece, and she accepts. The day she graduates from Harbor along with her friends Summer, Ryan, Seth, and Taylor, Kevin begins calling her and asks to see her, but she declines. Marissa pays Kevin to get out of town and to leave her and Ryan alone. She says her goodbyes to her family and friends and prepares to leave for Greece. After their time together, Ryan drives her to the airport. On the way to the airport, a drunken Kevin begins hitting their car, causing them to go off the road.

Marissa's death. In The Graduates" (episode 3.25)

The car flips over several times and lands upside down on another street. Marissa is unconscious, but Ryan pulls her out of the car, which begins to drip gasoline. Ryan takes Marissa into his arms and away from the car as it explodes. He tells her that he will need to go get help, but knowing that nothing can be done, she asks him to stay. After a few moments of looking into each other's eyes, she dies while in Ryan's arms.

=== Season 4 ===
In "The Avengers," Summer believes she sees Marissa - as a ghost - when she returns to the adjoining bedrooms they shared together for the first time since Marissa's death. This causes Summer to fast track her trip back to Brown and leave Newport Beach. Moreover, many characters throughout Season 4 catch glimpses of Marissa, whether they be similar-looking girls in passing or a ghostly imagination of Marissa while reminiscing about her in a familiar place.

Marissa's death has a significant impact on the fourth season, as various characters, particularly her mother Julie and Ryan, struggle to deal with their grief over her death. In the episode "The Cold Turkey", Julie decides that it was time to move on after learning that Volchok turned himself over to the police and had been arrested. Later in the episode, during Thanksgiving dinner, Ryan reminisces to Julie about the first time he saw Marissa out on the driveway and thought that "she was really hot". Marissa's death is most explicitly examined in the episode "The Chrismukk-huh?" where Ryan and Taylor Townsend, both in comas, enter into an alternate universe where he has never moved to Newport Beach, and the lives of most major characters are completely changed.

While trying to find out what is happening in this reality, Taylor stumbles into Marissa's bedroom. She surprises Julie's maid, who tells Taylor that "Miss Cooper's" plane arrives at 3 o'clock from Berkeley. Taylor then sees a photograph of Marissa and Julie on her desk, which leads her to believe that Marissa is still alive in this alternate universe.

After Taylor tells Ryan the news, he immediately wants to go to the airport to see Marissa. Taylor does not want him too, in fear that Ryan, who is still recovering from Marissa's death, would be willing to spend the rest of his life in a coma if he could be with Marissa. At the airport, Ryan catches a glimpse of a girl with a pink Berkeley sweatshirt tied around her waist. The sweatshirt resembles the one worn by Marissa in "The Day After Tomorrow." Ryan grabs her shoulder and realizes that it is not Marissa, but her sister, Kaitlin. Kaitlin then explains to Ryan that her sister died three years ago in an overdose in Tijuana (a parallel of her non-fatal overdose in the episode "The Escape").

Ryan thinks he sees Marissa. "The Chrismukk-huh?" (episode 4.7)

Ryan then returns to Newport Beach, realizing that he can never be with Marissa again, alternate universe or not. At first, Ryan and Taylor believe they need to restore the relationships that existed before Marissa's death in order to wake up. However, it becomes apparent that both Ryan and Taylor need to battle their internal demons instead. For Taylor, her demon is her mother (whom she confronts along with her alternate male self at the Christmas party), and for Ryan, it is getting over Marissa.

Back in the real world, Kirsten finds a letter from Marissa addressed to Ryan but does not read it. She hands it over to Julie, who reads the letter. Marissa wrote that she still loved Ryan, but would be leaving Newport Beach because she knew that it was the best thing to do, so that they could both move on. She stated that when she got back, they might try again, as they would both be older and wiser. The letter is eventually placed right beside Ryan, which allows the letter to be "delivered" to Ryan in the alternate universe.

Ryan then goes to the beach, and upon discovering the letter, reads it. He finally says goodbye to Marissa and exits the alternate universe.

In the final episode, Marissa appears as Ryan's final flashback as he reflects on his life in Newport Beach. As he backs out of the driveway, Ryan remembers seeing Marissa standing on the corner watching as he and Sandy drive away when Ryan thought he was not coming back to Newport Beach (as seen in "The Premiere").

== Relationships ==
=== Ryan Atwood ===
Ryan Atwood is Marissa's second boyfriend on The O.C. Although extremely on-and-off-again throughout the show's course - their relationship originated as a platonic friendship in the pilot episode, which later escalated into romantic feelings. By the 10th episode of the first season, the couple officially began their romantic relationship. The beginning of this relationship sees its first end when Marissa feels that Ryan has overreacted to Marissa and Oliver Trask's friendship. The second course of Marissa and Ryan's relationship fails because of Theresa Diaz and Ryan's illegitimate child together, whom Ryan agrees to help raise – returning to Theresa's arms and leaving Marissa to return to her alcoholic behavior. The third attempt of Marissa and Ryan's relationship terminates after the suicide of Johnny Harper where they struggle to mourn him and need a break from each other. The couple's last attempt at a relationship ends when Marissa is killed by a drunken Kevin Volchok who sends Ryan and Marissa's car off the road, sending her to her death.

=== Julie Cooper ===
The overall relationship between Marissa and her mother, Julie Cooper, is full of angst, rebellion, misunderstanding and miscommunication. Beginning with the fling between Julie and Marissa's ex-boyfriend Luke Ward, the strain in the two's relationship increases throughout the course of the show. After Marissa's father Jimmy Cooper and Julie divorce, Julie treats Marissa as second tier to her many wealthy, successful boyfriends and fiancés in an attempt to save her own social and monetary status. The troubled Marissa is then left to deal with her friendship, alcoholic, and depression issue alone, without the help of Julie. The mother-daughter duo move from their home neighboring the Cohens, to Caleb Nichol's home, to a mobile home during their time of financial hardship.

=== Summer Roberts ===
Summer Roberts, Marissa's best friend, is a girl that Marissa often leans on in both happy and sad times. Marissa's nickname for Summer, “Sum,” emphasizes the two's bond. Together, Marissa and Summer are the popular girls at school: Summer the socialite, and Marissa the over-achieving, beautiful girl many long to be. The friendship between Summer and Marissa is further strengthened by the boyfriends they often have: best friends, and “brothers,” Seth Cohen and Ryan Atwood, as many group hang-outs and double dates occur. After every fight between Marissa's on-and-off-again boyfriend, Ryan, Summer is the first by Marissa's side – a supportive and comforting friend asking what went wrong. Summer becomes a positive force in Marissa's life. For instance, Summer helps Marissa out of the hospital in episode 8, is open to Marissa's fluid sexuality in episode 24, and has enough faith in Marissa despite her problematic behavior that she buys her a Berkeley sweatshirt in episode 71. Their friendship offers strong signs of female solidarity and is unique in that it is shown as a source of support and a catalyst for empowerment.

=== Luke Ward ===
Marissa's first romantic relationship on the show is with water polo player Luke Ward. Their relationship begins prior to the Premiere. Marissa and Luke's relationship stems back to the fifth grade on a class trip to the Museum of Tolerance. After much hesitation, Marissa decides to lose her virginity to Luke. Issues in Marissa and Luke's relationship constantly arise, making the viewer question if they really are in love. On a trip to Tijuana, Marissa discovers Luke cheating on her with one of her friends, Holly Fischer, on the dance floor in a club. Marissa breaks up with Luke, who later begins an affair with her mother, Julie Cooper. Luke and Marissa's tumultuous relationship evolves into a mature friendship by the second season. The two realize that they may not be the most compatible couple but can benefit from each other's friendship and support.
