= Summer Roberts =

Character from The O.C.

- The O.C. character
- Rachel Bilson as Summer Roberts
- First appearance: "Premiere" (episode 1.01)
- Last appearance: "The End's Not Near, It's Here" (episode 4.16)
- Created by: Josh Schwartz
- Portrayed by: Rachel Bilson

In-universe information
- Aliases: Summer Cohen (married name)
- Nicknames: Sum, Dim Sum, Caterpillar; Little Miss Vixen
- Gender: Female
- Occupation: Animal rights activist High school student (at the Harbor School; graduated); College student (at Brown; graduated)
- Family: Neil Roberts (father); Unnamed woman (biological mother; ambiguous); Gloria Roberts (former stepmother)
- Spouse: Seth Cohen
- Significant others: Danny (ex-boyfriend); Zach Stevens (ex-boyfriend)
- Relatives: Sanford "Sandy" Cohen (father-in-law); Kirsten Cohen (mother-in-law); Sophie Rose Cohen (sister-in-law); Ryan Atwood (adoptive brother-in-law); Sophie Cohen (grandmother-in-law); Caleb Nichol (grandfather-in-law; deceased); Rose Nichol (grandmother-in-law; deceased)
- Residence: Newport Beach, California

Summer Roberts is a fictional character on the FOX television series The O.C., portrayed by Rachel Bilson.

== Production history ==
Summer was originally intended as a small supporting character, only there as an object of fantasy for Seth Cohen (Adam Brody) and a friend for Marissa Cooper (Mischa Barton), while Ryan Atwood (Ben McKenzie) and Marissa were the lead couple. However, due to Bilson's performance, Summer became an increasingly important character. Series creator Josh Schwartz said: "She was adorable, funny and smart, which was a really fresh way to go with that character. And the more we gave her to do in the first couple of episodes, the more she kept nailing. Finally, in the episode with the Tijuana road trip, we watched a scene between her and Seth in the diner and knew: This girl is amazing. Let's make her a series regular."

== Character ==
Summer Roberts grew up in Newport Beach, California, with her wealthy father, Dr. Neil Roberts (Michael Nouri). For much of the series, she also lived with a stepmother, named Gloria (unseen character), whom she never refers to by name, instead calling the latter "what's her name" or "the stepmonster" due to her mood swings and various addictive pills. She was often paired in scenes with her best friend, Marissa Cooper (Mischa Barton), who was the leading female of the series until her death. Summer became the female lead character of the show's fourth season. During this all, she had a long lasting relationship with Seth Cohen. In a flash forward in the series finale, "The End's Not Near, It's Here", she marries Seth. Her character was only scheduled to appear in a few episodes, but was considered a hit, and ended up being in each of the series. Spoiled by her divorced father, Summer considers him to be her best friend, and his opinion matters as much, if not more than her own.

Summer was unusual in combining the qualities of a conventionally attractive and desirable character with a tough, outspoken, "take-charge" attitude. She is portrayed as highly sexualised and initially appears unintelligent; however it is revealed that she has maintained strong academic performance throughout high school when she is accepted into Brown University, where she nurtures a passion for environmental activism.

In season 4 Summer adopts a pet rabbit and names her Pancakes. It is revealed in the season finale that Pancakes had been pregnant, after Seth and Summer discover Pancakes' babies living under her bed. Ryan adopted one of the bunnies, naming it Flapjacks.

== Storyline ==
=== Season 1 ===
In the first season, Summer is introduced as a high schooler who is obnoxious and snotty. Her elitism is on display in the first episode, where she is at first attracted to newcomer Ryan Atwood – until she learns he is from Chino, prompting her response, "Chino, ew." Her attraction to him continues afterwards. However, different sides to her character have been shown as she has developed. Before choosing Summer (after her finally showing her feelings for Seth) Seth picks Anna Stern (Samaire Armstrong), who exhibits a similarly strong personality and shares his sarcastic sense of humor and love of comic books, the first go around. For the few episodes, they have a "will they or won't they" type of relationship, but they eventually begin dating and fall in love. In the process of their characters' relationship, Summer and Seth experience many struggles because Summer thinks it will affect her status quo at their high school.

As the season progresses, Summer is affected by their relationship and is often jealous of Seth, since he seems to be enjoying Anna's company so much. As a result, Summer gets angry and starts dating a classmate named Danny (Bret Harrison), but that relationship doesn't last long, and she finds that she still has feelings for Seth. Midway through the end of the first season, Anna breaks up with Seth because it is obvious he is still in love with Summer. Seth and Summer become a couple, and announce their romance at a school kissing booth, after which they become very close. Summer and Seth lose their virginity to each other. When Ryan moves away, however, Seth, missing his adopted brother, moves away as well at the end of the season, leaving behind a heartbroken Summer.

=== Season 2 ===
Summer has a new boyfriend, Zach Stevens (Michael Cassidy). Zach is starting to become friends with Seth, whom he met shortly before Zach and Summer started dating, yet their friendship is a little mixed since they both have feelings for Summer. Summer seems committed to putting Seth behind her, although at times it becomes clear that she still has feelings for him. This inevitably causes problems for her relationship with Zach, who suspected they still held feelings for each other. This is further complicated when Summer also becomes professionally involved with Seth and Zach as they develop their comic book, Atomic County, for publication. This relationship proves inextricably linked with the personal feelings all have for each other, and resulted in a bad meeting with a media executive that effectively killed their partnership.

Seth and Summer at their Junior Prom in "The O.Sea" (episode 2.23)

Summer was about to go on an overseas trip to Italy with Zach and his family, when the feelings she still had for Seth prevented her from doing so and she left her heartbroken Zach at the airport, going back to Seth. Zach returned later on in the season however, and this along with Zach and Seth once again going into a partnership for a comic book strained her relationship with Seth. Zach also somewhat subtly exploited this to weaken Seth and Summer's relationship and restart his relationship with her, causing something of a love triangle. The introduction of Reed, a female attractive, older comic book executive who Seth was not initially truthful about also caused difficulties. This was eventually resolved when on the day of the Junior Prom they flipped a coin as to who would go to the prom with Summer and who would meet George Lucas for a comic book project meeting, with Zach winning the date with Summer. However at the Prom both Summer and Zach seemed unhappy with their choices, and at the last minute Seth arrived at the prom to receive the Prom Queen/King award with Summer and reconciled their relationship. Zach apparently succeeded in impressing Lucas and it has been rumored he was given an internship and moved away from Newport as a result, explaining his absence for season 3.

Towards the end of the season Summer also becomes worried about her best friend Marissa's behaviour, unexplained bruises and a tension with her boyfriend Ryan and his brother Trey. She confronts Marissa and Marissa confesses that Trey had attempted to rape her. Summer consults Seth about this, who feels obliged to tell Ryan and as a result the tragic events of Trey's shooting happen, with Seth and Summer arriving at the aftermath of the shooting.

=== Season 3 ===
Summer is adjusting to her senior year at Harbor School, with the year starting with her best friend Marissa Cooper expelled from Harbor as a result of her involvement in the shooting of Trey Atwood (Logan Marshall-Green). As a result, Summer reluctantly seeks a more involved role in student politics, gaining a new rival in fellow student Taylor Townsend (Autumn Reeser). They have since become friends, particularly when Taylor helped her get Marissa back in by organizing a petition. Summer is initially insecure about her relationship with Seth, because she often felt that he was smarter than her and she feared that he would break up with her for someone more like him. However, when Summer gets a very high SAT score, it gives her the ambition to change, and she begins to focus on school.

Also, her relationship with Seth is closer than it was during much of the previous year, and the couple's post-graduation future is one that she finds harder to ignore. They have trouble earlier in the season deciding what colleges to go to and how it would affect their future together, but eventually they agree on going to Brown University, which is more feasible after Summer gets a high SAT score. Summer cares a lot about Seth and when he starts smoking pot, she becomes worried about him and forgives him if he promises to stop. When Summer finds out that Seth is still smoking pot, she is upset, but Seth apologizes with a letter on a napkin, admitting his lies and mistakes, and tells Summer that if he messes up again, she can show it to his parents. Summer forgives Seth. Shortly before they get their college acceptance letters, Summer says that if should she get into Brown and not Seth, she will not go. When they get their letters, to Seth's dismay this happens. Seth, not wanting to be responsible for Summer turning down a major educational and life opportunity, says he does not want to go to Brown anymore. As a result, they break up, with Seth stating when confronted by Summer that he does not love her anymore. While their future as a couple seems uncertain at this point (and is complicated by the return of Seth's ex-girlfriend Anna Stern), Summer takes a Korean pop star as date for the prom. Upon seeing Seth with Anna, Summer feels hurt. When Summer falls off the stage after being announced Prom Queen for the second time in a row, Seth runs to her and tells her the truth about Brown and they reconcile. They have resigned themselves to going to school in Rhode Island, albeit at different schools.

Summer has also dealt with several changes in her home life, such as her stepmother, an unseen character, leaving and divorcing her father. Also more recently she has had to deal with her father dating her best friend's mother, Julie Cooper (Melinda Clarke). She eventually accepted the relationship and recently announced engagement, however, seeing the happiness it had brought her father despite her own reservations about Julie.

=== Season 4 ===
Summer is adjusting to life in college without Seth and Marissa in an unexpected fashion. She tries to separate herself from Orange County and her former materialistic lifestyle. During the final season, she and Taylor go from being rivals to best friends. Whilst attending college she befriends another college freshman, Che (Chris Pratt), an environmentalist, and Summer becomes one as well in an attempt to take her mind off Marissa's recent death. She attends protests, stops shaving her legs and rearranges her dorm to fit her new lifestyle. After some time, she tries to return to her old lifestyle, but realizes that she prefers having a purpose in life to her former comfortable, but shallow, existence. She decides to find a balance between the two extremes, but her environmental activism occasionally creates trouble for her, such as when she and Che release lab rabbits from a science lab. When Brown officials investigate the incident, she remains truthful aside for not naming her accomplice. Unfortunately, Che puts the blame on her, which results in her year-long expulsion. Summer moves back into her old Newport house with the Coopers and Taylor. Upon hearing of her expulsion, Seth decides to put off college until the following fall so they could return to Providence together. Close to New Year's Eve, Summer has a pregnancy scare, and Seth proposes to her. Although Summer finds out she is not pregnant after all, she and Seth decide to move ahead with their engagement.

In "The French Connection", Summer meets up with former best friend Holly Fischer (Ashley Hartman) to find out what life is like as a "Newpsie-wed". Summer realizes that she has changed and no longer belongs in her old world; she fears that she does not know who she truly is, and breaks off the engagement with Seth in order to find herself. She slowly works toward this as she and Seth re-connect.

Later, Summer helps rescue a groundhog in a political protest in which Seth and Che are arrested. Also, in "The Case of the Franks" Summer gets offered a job at GEORGE (Global Environmental Organisation Regarding Greenhouse Emissions) travelling around the country speaking to children in high school. She believes that this is one part of her destiny, while Seth is the other.

She challenges Seth to make stock film after he criticizes the films at GEORGE's art show. As a joke, he films an inflatable orca and shark in his backyard swimming pool for six hours. Summer is not amused, however, and says that he should stop being lazy and actually do something with his life. During his second attempt, which consists of various adventures of the family, he overhears a conversation between Summer and Kirsten, in which the former says that she just wants Seth to be excited about something that he loves. During a trip to rent An Inconvenient Truth, an earthquake hits Newport. Summer and Seth safely get out of Ryan's Jeep when a light pole falls onto it.

==== Series finale ====
Six months later, Seth and Summer fall into a rut after the earthquake, and spend hours watching Briefcase or No Briefcase (a television game show take-off of Deal or No Deal). Seth tells her that she must join GEORGE, and they will always be together. Summer leaves Seth to help the environment and they say farewell. Summer attends protests and works to save the environment and educate students on environmental issues for a year. She appears in newspaper articles as an environmentalist. In a flash-forward sequence, Summer ends up marrying Seth.

== Reception ==
- Summer Roberts was rated number 9 in FHM's "All-time sexiest girls next door".
