= Sandy Cohen =

Fictional character on The O.C.

- The O.C. character
- Peter Gallagher as Sanford Cohen
- First appearance: "Premiere" (episode 1.01)
- Last appearance: "The End's Not Near, It's Here" (episode 4.16)
- Created by: Josh Schwartz
- Portrayed by: Peter Gallagher; Max Greenfield (flashbacks)

In-universe information
- Gender: Male
- Title(s): Former: CEO of the Newport Group; Co-owner of The Lighthouse
- Occupation: Law professor Former: Lawyer; Public defender
- Family: Sophie Cohen (mother); Unnamed father
- Spouses: Kirsten Cohen (wife; 3 children [1 adopted])
- Significant others: Rebecca Bloom (ex-fiancée [before pilot])
- Children: Seth Cohen (son, with Kirsten); Ryan Atwood (adoptive son, with Kirsten); Sophie Rose Cohen (daughter, with Kirsten)
- Relatives: Caleb Nichol (father-in-law; deceased); Rose Nichol (mother-in-law; deceased); Julie Cooper (stepmother-in-law); Hailey Nichol (sister-in-law, via Kirsten); Lindsay Gardner (half-sister-in-law, via Kirsten); Cooper Atwood (stepbrother-in-law, via Kirsten); Marissa Cooper (stepsister-in-law, via Kirsten; deceased); Kaitlin Cooper (stepsister-in-law, via Kirsten); Summer Roberts (daughter-in-law, via Seth)
- Residence: Berkeley, California; Formerly: Newport Beach, California (Note: Sandy and Kirsten Cohen moved back to Berkeley in the flash forward.)

Sanford "Sandy" Cohen is a fictional character on the FOX series The O.C., portrayed by Peter Gallagher.

Sandy, son of Sophie Cohen, is married to Kirsten Cohen. Their eldest child, Seth, is something of a social misfit. Sandy's father left his mother when he was young and he has an unnamed brother and sister. Sandy's parents and siblings are not characters on The O.C. Sandy was originally a public defender, which brought him into contact with troubled teen, Ryan Atwood, whom he eventually adopted and took on as his own after Ryan's mother abandoned him. He has since gone into private practice in a law firm, before going to start his own law firm, taking over his late father-in-law's company, the Newport Group, returning to being a defense lawyer after Seth accidentally burned down the Newport Group headquarters, and finally becoming a Law professor. Sandy and Kirsten have three children. Sandy supports more liberal politics when compared to his wife Kirsten Cohen. He campaigned for the Democratic presidential candidate Walter Mondale in 1984, while his wife Kirsten Cohen supported the Republican candidate, Ronald Reagan.

Throughout the series, Sandy serves as a moral center, often guiding and supporting Seth and Ryan, and at times their love interests Marissa Cooper, Summer Roberts and Taylor Townsend, through their problems.

== Characterization ==
Despite living in Newport and marrying a "Newpsie", it becomes apparent that Sandy does not consider himself to be "one of them". His blue-collar, single-parent-upbringing in The Bronx contrasts with that of his wife Kirsten. Like long-time next door neighbor Julie Cooper, he was not raised in the affluent Newport lifestyle but unlike Julie, he generally disassociates himself from his counterparts. He usually does not fail to make known his distaste for the shallow, materialistic and pampered ways of his contemporaries who were born and bred in that lifestyle, even going so far as to describe Harbor School teachers as "preppy little savages" and calling the housewives' social gatherings "Newpsie Conventions".

As the more easy-going parent, Sandy's "hippie parenting" sometimes clashed with Kirsten's more strict and firm style. He prefers to let his children learn the error of their ways by experiencing the consequences themselves.

== Character arc ==
=== Season 1 ===
Sandy has a mainly stable relationship with Kirsten and Seth, albeit with the occasional problem surfacing. Unresolved issues of trust and jealousy rise to the surface with regards to Kirsten's former childhood sweetheart, Jimmy Cooper, who is also their next-door neighbor in Season 1.

He leaves the Public Defender's Office to go into private practice at Patridge, Savage and Khan, along with his former colleague from the District Attorney's office, Rachel Hoffman. She causes tension between Sandy and Kirsten when Kirsten finds Sandy enjoying a drink with Rachel one night while he was supposed to be at a meeting. Later on, Sandy and Rachel get involved in a case against Caleb's company, the Newport Group. Both were accused by Caleb of having an affair because they had been spending a lot of time together and working very late. Not long afterwards, when Rachel and Sandy were working late in her apartment, she indeed makes a play for him, but he rejects her advances. He and Kirsten then attempt to set her up with the newly divorced Jimmy, to no avail.

=== Season 2 ===
Rebecca Bloom, an old flame of Sandy's, came back into their lives, causing difficulties between him and Kirsten. This contributed towards her growing alcohol problem, and the distance between her and Sandy caused her to almost have an affair with a magazine editor, Carter Buckley, although he left before anything happened. This came to a head when Kirsten's father, Caleb Nichol, died which caused Kirsten's drinking problem to run out of control, forcing the entire Cohen family (including Ryan) and Kirsten's sister Hailey to stage an intervention and put her in rehab.

=== Season 3 ===
He has many problems with the challenges of doing business in the real estate world in his new job as CEO of the Newport Group. This again affected his family life, although the season three finale saw him making the decision to return to being a public defender after revisiting his old office and seeing what it was like.

=== Season 4 ===
In the fourth season, Sandy helps Ryan sort things out with Kevin Volchok, who was responsible for the death of Marissa and he was also the one who talks Ryan into helping Taylor, who was in the middle of a divorce from her French husband, Henri-Michel.

Later in the season, Sandy bumps into a man at the New Year's Eve party and investigates further. The man is revealed to be Ryan's father, Frank Atwood, whom Sandy meets. Frank wants to see Ryan, so Sandy tells Ryan who refuses. Frank tells Sandy that he has cancer so Kirsten invites him to dinner but Sandy is suspicious. It is later revealed Frank lied in a last-ditch attempt to see Ryan, prompting Sandy to punch him in front of everyone.

Sandy helps in the preparation for Kirsten's fortieth birthday. He finds a mail truck, exactly the same model as the one that both of them lived in Berkeley, while his real present to her was two first-class tickets around the world. When he tells a stunned Kirsten, she announces that she is having a baby. After an earthquake hits Newport Beach, Sandy finds Kirsten on the ground, and tries to help her up, but had difficulties because of the falling objects around them. At the hospital, Sandy and Kirsten discover that they are going to have a daughter.

==== Series finale ====
Six months later, he and Kirsten move to Berkeley; back to the house where they had Seth. It is in this house that Seth and Ryan's sister, Sophie Rose, starts her life. In the flashforward set five years later, Sandy is now a law professor at UC Berkeley.

== Creation and characterization ==
The character is based on the show's creator Josh Schwartz who told: "The dynamic between Sandy and Seth is very much based on me and my dad. He said about Sandy: "He is never a man who can refuse to help someone."

== Reception ==
In 2004, TV Guide ranked Sandy number 25 on its 50 Greatest TV Dads of All Time list. BuddyTV ranked him number 7 on its of the "15 Hottest TV Dads". AOL TV placed him in its Top 20 TV Dads.
