= Kirsten Cohen =

Fictional character from The O.C.

- The O.C. character
- Kelly Rowan as Kirsten Cohen
- First appearance: "Premiere" (episode 1.01)
- Last appearance: "The End's Not Near, It's Here" (episode 4.16)
- Created by: Josh Schwartz
- Portrayed by: Kelly Rowan; Ellen Hollman (flashbacks)

In-universe information
- Alias: Kirsten Nichol (maiden name)
- Nickname: Kiki (by father and Julie); Kiks (by sister)
- Gender: Female
- Title: Partner, NewMatch; Former: CFO of the Newport Group; CEO of the Newport Group
- Occupation: Architect businesswoman
- Family: Caleb Nichol (father; deceased); Rose Nichol (mother; deceased); Julie Cooper (stepmother); Hailey Nichol (younger sister); Lindsay Gardner (paternal half-sister); Marissa Cooper (stepsister, via Caleb; deceased); Kaitlin Cooper (stepsister, via Caleb)
- Spouse: Sanford "Sandy" Cohen (husband; 3 children [1 adopted])
- Significant other: James "Jimmy" Cooper (ex-boyfriend [before pilot]); Carter Buckley (crush)
- Children: Seth Cohen (son, with Sandy); Ryan Atwood (adoptive son, with Sandy); Sophie Rose Cohen (daughter, with Sandy)
- Relatives: Sophie Cohen (mother-in-law); Summer Roberts (daughter-in-law, via Seth)
- Religion: Christianity (Presbyterianism)
- Residence: Berkeley, California; Formerly: Newport Beach, California

Kirsten Cohen (maiden name Nichol) is a fictional character on the FOX television series The O.C., portrayed by Kelly Rowan. Kirsten is the wife of Sandy Cohen, mother to Seth Cohen, and the adoptive mother of Ryan Atwood. Originally portrayed as being unwelcoming towards Ryan in the Cohen household, she began to develop feelings for the brooding teenager, going on to accept him as a central member of her family.

== Characterization ==
=== Background ===
Kirsten Nichol was born in Newport Beach in Orange County, California. She is the eldest daughter of Caleb and Rose Nichol, elder sister of Hailey Nichol, and elder half-sister to Lindsay Gardner. She comes from a very wealthy background: her father is a real estate developer who founded The Newport Group, one of the most powerful companies in California. Kirsten was raised Presbyterian. She is presumably Scottish American. In "The Best Chrismukkah Ever", Seth described her background as "Waspy McWasp". Although the Nichols appear to be the envy of Newport, Kirsten has stated multiple times that she was unhappy with her family life due to her distant and domineering father, alcoholic mother, and rebellious sister.

She is a graduate of the University of California, Berkeley with a degree in art history. During her college years, she met her future husband, Sanford "Sandy" Cohen, on a campaign for the 1984 presidential elections. Kirsten states that when they fell in love, she "lived in a mail truck and stank of patchouli". They married, and Kirsten gave birth to a son, Seth. In the season 2 episode "The O.Sea", they celebrated their twentieth anniversary and Sandy serenades her with the song "Don't Give Up on Me".

Shortly after Kirsten began her family, her mother became ill with ovarian cancer. This prompted the Cohens to move back to Newport. She joined her father at The Newport Group, becoming the workaholic she was introduced as at the beginning of the show.

=== Personality ===
In contrast to her husband, who campaigned for Democratic presidential candidate Walter Mondale in 1984, Kirsten was relatively conservative and supported the Republican Party because her parents did. Kirsten herself has admitted to being a stricter parent and has sometimes clashed with Sandy's "hippie parenting". Seth would humorously refer to her no-nonsense persona as "The Kirsten". When Ryan's biological mother Dawn leaves Newport for good in the first season, she notes that Kirsten personified everything a mother should be. Like Seth, Ryan, despite his stubborn streak, clearly values her approval and affection. By season 2, he refers to her as "like my mom".

Kirsten may appear to be shallow and materialistic like her fellow "Newpsies" but it becomes evident that she is not one of them, and prefers to occupy herself with her work and family; she is often seen grousing privately about the other wives' gossipy attitude prior to parties and social gatherings, which she attends only because of her family's social standing. She is generous, sympathetic, and fiercely protective of her family, including Ryan, to the point where she extended her kindness to his biological mother Dawn and ex-girlfriend Theresa. When any member of her family is threatened, her headstrong and manipulative side comes out; during Season 2, she confronts her father for calling Ryan an "inland street thug" and threatens to cut off her ties with him if he does not agree to go to a dinner with her, Ryan, and Lindsay, Caleb's newfound illegitimate daughter. She once told Sandy, "There isn't anything I wouldn't do for my family." When her family and sister Hailey confronted her about her drinking problem at the end of Season 2, it was the boys who managed to convince her to go to rehab.

A running gag in Kirsten's story arc is her lack of talent in the kitchen. During Ryan's first thanksgiving in Newport, Sandy and the boys "made a pact" to keep her out of the kitchen. However, her absence was keenly felt when she was in rehab for her alcohol problem at the beginning of season 3 as the household descends into disarray, evidenced by the messy kitchen and empty refrigerator.

Kirsten's motherly instincts contrasts with those of the other "Newpsies" such as Marissa and Kaitlin Cooper's mother Julie (for the first three seasons) and Taylor Townsend's mother Veronica. Summer (who grew up without a maternal figure), Marissa and Taylor have all sought her advice and are often seen around the Cohen home. Despite her initial reservations, she welcomes Ryan into the family and almost immediately indiscriminately refers to him as her son, rather than "foster son" or the more legally accurate term "ward". She is also welcoming to her boys' girlfriends and would ask them over for dinner.

== Character arc ==
=== Season 1 ===
Kirsten is introduced when she meets troubled teen Ryan Atwood for the first time. Ryan was her husband's client, whom he brought home with him because he had nowhere else to stay after being thrown out of the house by his mother. Under the impression that Ryan is going to stay only until Sandy is able to contact Child Services, she reluctantly allows him to stay in the pool house.

Later, Kirsten meets Dawn, Ryan's mother. After Dawn breaks her promise to quit drinking, Kirsten tries to persuade her to stay for Ryan's sake but Dawn admits that the Cohens can provide a better life for her son and leaves a disappointed Ryan, after telling Kirsten to take care of him. Kirsten and Sandy thus become his legal guardians. The rest of the season focuses on the Cohens adjusting to the newest member of the family, with Kirsten becoming a mother figure in Ryan's eyes. They bond over a shared interest in architecture and the housing industry; Kirsten worked for her father's real estate company while Ryan used to spend his summers working in construction and dreamed of becoming an architect. In the season finale when Ryan returns to Chino with his ex-girlfriend Theresa, she is seen removing his bed sheets and sobbing in Sandy arms, visibly saddened by Ryan's departure.

Although Kirsten has a mostly stable marriage compared to the other main characters, her close friendship with next-door neighbor and ex-boyfriend Jimmy Cooper causes tension and awkwardness between her and her husband. When Jimmy finds himself in financial trouble, she lends him money. Not long after, she and Sandy find out that Jimmy had been taking money from his clients' accounts to support himself. Ultimately, Sandy helps defend Jimmy from doing jail time.

In the first-season finale, Kirsten hints to Theresa Diaz, Ryan's pregnant ex-girlfriend, that she had an abortion early in her life.

=== Season 2 ===
The problems begin for Kirsten during the second season when she fears that her husband is cheating on her with an old girlfriend, Rebecca Bloom, who has mysteriously shown up back in town. Sandy and Kirsten's marriage begins to deteriorate, and she turns to alcohol to compensate. Her alcoholism is fueled by working closely with a man whom she has a crush on, Newport Living magazine editor Carter Buckley, who also drinks too much.

Towards the end of the season, Kirsten crashes her car while driving drunk. She is in the middle of an emotional conversation with Sandy, who tells her to pull over, when she drops her phone on the center console. Kirsten reaches over to pick up her phone but doesn't see that she is approaching an intersection. A truck runs over her car.

Kirsten survives the accident with minor bruises and a few broken fingers. She convinces Sandy that she's swearing off alcohol after the scare of the accident, but Sandy finds a bottle of vodka in her purse. He is confronting her when Julie calls to inform the Cohens that Caleb died of a heart attack. Stricken, Kirsten walks away from Sandy with the bottle of vodka and is seen drinking throughout the evening.

Following an intervention staged by her worried family, she checks into a rehabilitation program for alcohol abuse after her father's funeral. She was initially resistant and defensive but agrees after seeing a distraught Seth and hearing the usually reticent Ryan talk about how his alcoholic biological mother refused to seek help.

=== Season 3 ===
At Suriak Rehab, she meets Charlotte Morgan, who seems to be interested in making friends with her. In reality, Charlotte is a con artist. However, it is revealed during Caleb's will reading that he was bankrupt when he died and left Kirsten with nothing but a letter. Seeing the letter as a threat to the progress she made in rehab, she runs away and spends the night in a motel with a bottle of vodka, "but I didn't drink," she tells Sandy later. Kirsten returns home and creates a high-class dating service, NewMatch, with long-time friend and one-time stepmother Julie Cooper-Nichol.

Over the course of the season, Kirsten and her husband find themselves amidst conflict due to his decision to take over The Newport Group. Long hours make Kirsten concerned that Sandy is turning out to be a workaholic, but it is Sandy becoming like her father, getting into illegal deals and crossing the line often, that worries her the most. This causes her to relapse, yet the problem is settled when Sandy decides to quit the job at the end of the season.

=== Season 4 ===
Kirsten and Sandy go to Mexico to rescue Seth and Ryan after their sons go to Mexico in search of Kevin Volchok, who committed vehicular homicide by running Ryan off the road and killing Marissa in the previous season's finale. Seth, fearing that Ryan was on the warpath, intentionally gives him the wrong address, and his parents show up to bring the boys home. Ryan and Seth are still not talking at Thanksgiving, prompting Kirsten to send them on a trip to the grocery store.

Kirsten attempts to garner a silent partner for NewMatch in Gordon Bullit by setting him up with Julie. Bullitt almost pulls out when his son Spencer shows up at a fundraiser hosted by Sandy, but Kaitlin Cooper convinces him to invest. Later, Kirsten ostracizes Julie after suspicions about the business and fires her after she uncovers that it has become a prostitution ring.

A family crisis appears again when Frank, an accountant Bullit brings in to deal with NewMatch's books, reveals that he is Ryan's biological father. Kirsten was initially protective of Ryan, knowing Frank history of abusing Ryan and his mother and brother, but sees that Frank was now reformed and talks Sandy into giving him a chance. She invites him over for dinner, but it ends badly after they find out that Frank lied about having cancer just so he could see his son again.

On the night of Kirsten's fortieth birthday, Kirsten finds out that she is pregnant. This causes her to remember the abortion she had before going to college. She finally comes clean to Sandy about the abortion.

In the series finale, the Cohen home is destroyed in an earthquake. Sandy and Kirsten reluctantly begin house-hunting. After hearing their parents reminiscing, Seth and Ryan fly to Berkeley to find their old house, but the current owners are unwilling to sell. Sandy and Kirsten soon visit. While there, Kirsten asks the owners if she can use their bathroom. Her water breaks, and she gives birth to her daughter in the house in Berkeley. Her daughter is named Sophie Rose Cohen, after Sandy's and her own mother. This and number of ensuing events in the house convinces the current owners to sell the house to the Cohens.
