= Ryan Atwood =

Fictional character from The O.C.

- The O.C. character
- Ben McKenzie as Ryan Atwood
- First appearance: "Premiere" (episode 1.01)
- Last appearance: "The End's Not Near, It's Here" (episode 4.16)
- Created by: Josh Schwartz
- Portrayed by: Ben McKenzie

In-universe information
- Full name: Ryan Francis Atwood
- Nicknames: Chino (by Luke); Atwood (by Summer); Kid (by Sandy); Ry (by Trey)
- Gender: Male
- Occupation: Architect; High school student (at the Harbor School; graduated); College student (at UC Berkeley; graduated)
- Family: Sanford "Sandy" Cohen (adoptive father); Kirsten Cohen (adoptive mother); Seth Cohen (adoptive brother); Sophie Rose Cohen (adoptive younger sister); Sophie Cohen (adoptive paternal grandmother); Caleb and Rose Nichol (adoptive maternal grandparents; deceased); Hailey Nichol (adoptive maternal aunt); Francis "Frank" Atwood (biological father); Dawn Atwood (biological mother); Trey Atwood (biological older brother) unknown name (biological paternal half-brother); Lindsay Gardner (adoptive maternal half-aunt)
- Significant others: Taylor Townsend (possibly girlfriend, undefined); Theresa Diaz (ex-girlfriend); Marissa Cooper (ex-girlfriend, deceased); Gabrielle (fling); Lindsay Gardner (ex-girlfriend); Sadie Campbell (ex-girlfriend); Chloe (one-night stand)
- Relatives: Summer Roberts (sister-in-law, via Seth)
- Residence: Newport Beach, California; Formerly: Chino, California

Ryan Francis Atwood (born March 19, 1988) is a fictional character and the protagonist of the Fox television series The O.C., portrayed by Ben McKenzie. Atwood is an outcast and troubled teenager from Chino, California, who is given a second chance when the wealthy Cohen family takes him in.

== Concept and creation ==
=== Casting ===
"When Benjamin [McKenzie] came in, he wasn't physically what Josh [Schwartz] had envisioned, but he inhabited the character, unlike anyone we had seen. I think that the character of Ryan is a kid that always seems a little lost and has a sense of mystery and danger; Benjamin has all those qualities."
— Patrick Rush on the casting of Benjamin McKenzie as Ryan

The O.C.'s casting director Patrick Rush found the role of Ryan particularly hard to cast. Chad Michael Murray refused the role in favor of playing Lucas Scott on One Tree Hill. Rush invited Benjamin McKenzie to audition after Warner Bros. introduced him following an unsuccessful audition for a UPN sitcom. McKenzie, who had spent two years in New York City and Los Angeles seeking acting work, lacked experience and later described his selection as "a tremendous leap of faith" on the producers' part. Show creator Josh Schwartz said in 2014, "[McKenzie] took it really seriously, and brought a lot of integrity, and integrity is not always required in a Fox teen drama".

== Characterization ==
=== Background ===
The character Ryan was physically abused by his biological father Frank and some of his mother Dawn's boyfriends. He has a complicated, love-hate relationship with his older brother Trey. Both parents struggled with alcohol – Frank became physically abusive, while Dawn neglected and verbally abused him – and it left a deep impression on him, as shown by his aversion to strong alcoholic drinks. Coined from his own statements, Ryan never had a father figure for much of his life, before being adopted by the Cohens due to Frank's prison sentence and his mother's revolving door of boyfriends. The Atwoods lived in Fresno but moved to Chino after Frank was imprisoned.

In season 4, it is stated that Ryan had not seen Frank in eight years. Regarding Ryan's biological family, a major recurring theme revolved around abandonment. His mother abandoned him twice, his brother left for Las Vegas without telling him and his father left the brothers and their mom "with nothing" after serving his prison sentence. This is contrasted by the character's adopted family—the Cohens—who stood by Ryan despite his juvenile record, vocal criticisms and disdain from the other "Newpsies" about his adoption and his multiple attempts to run away from them. Although he does not address Mr. and Mrs. Cohen (Sandy and Kirsten respectively) as Dad or Mom, he makes it clear that he considers them to be his parents.

Ryan generally dislikes speaking about his biological family and hints during Christmas and Thanksgiving that the holidays bring up painful memories for him. During his first Chrismukkah in Newport Beach, he tells the Cohens that his holidays mainly consisted of him "getting [his] ass kicked" and sums up his Christmas memories in three words: drinking, crying and cops.

=== Personality ===
Ryan was born to and then raised in a working class family, as such he knew the lifestyle and attitudes of people from his neighborhood of Chino, California, as well as the dangers that occurred in cases where outsiders are influenced by its environment. His abusive past enabled him to develop an extremely high pain threshold, and he displays an impassive expression after being physically abused. He is tough, cynical and quick-tempered, yet compassionate and empathetic toward people in trouble and those less fortunate than himself.

During his first months in Newport, he expressed his anger physically after incessant teasing from his schoolmates, which led them to intentionally goad him more. Ryan gradually calmed, after a lecture from Sandy and a stint at an anger management counseling session. He at times appears burdened by an almost compulsive need to rescue others at the expense of his own well-being, and as a result, is overly protective of Marissa, who is his main love interest on the show. Ryan displays intimacy issues—an inability to form close relationships—due to his birth family's collective problems. He is extremely loyal to his family (both biological and adopted) and those he cares about. He is quiet and rarely smiles, which is a running joke among other members of the Cohen household. Early in the first season when he first moves in with the Cohens, he avoids making eye contact, and would stiffen when hugged, but by the final season, he moves past these issues with his adoptive family. Despite his reticent nature and emotionless exterior, Ryan is transparent, often "convey[ing] everything with just a look", and is virtually incapable of lying. Dad Sandy proved this in the episode "The O.Sea" when he caught Ryan trying to cover up for Seth but Ryan's "guilty face" gave it away.

Ryan's personality is the opposite of the socially awkward, sheltered and sometimes naïve adopted brother Seth, and Ryan frequently uses his street-savvy skills to get Seth out of trouble. Seth often jokes about how he knew both Summer and Marissa since elementary school despite having never spoken to them.

As a student, Ryan is described as highly intelligent despite his behavior problems (he was suspended multiple times for fighting and truancy). In the pilot episode, the audience learns that he took his SATs (the only sophomore doing so) and scored in the 98th percentile. According to his mother Dawn, Ryan was always "the smart one, the good one" in the family.

Ryan's favorite fruit is peaches, and his favorite band is Journey and he suffers from acrophobia. Athletically, he plays football (safety) and soccer (striker) in school. Despite the generosity of his adoptive family, Ryan earns money at various part-time jobs around town—as a busboy at the Crab Shack, a construction worker, an intern at the Newport Group, and a barback position. Ryan is an ex-smoker.

Of the characters in the show, Ryan is closest to his adoptive brother Seth, and their respective love interests—Marissa and Summer. This "core four" group of friends is the basis of Seth's Atomic County comic series. Ryan and Seth often finish each other's sentences, according to Summer, "like they're composing a lie on the spot", and they also read each other's body language and facial expressions.
