= Kelly Rowan =

Canadian actress (b. 1965)

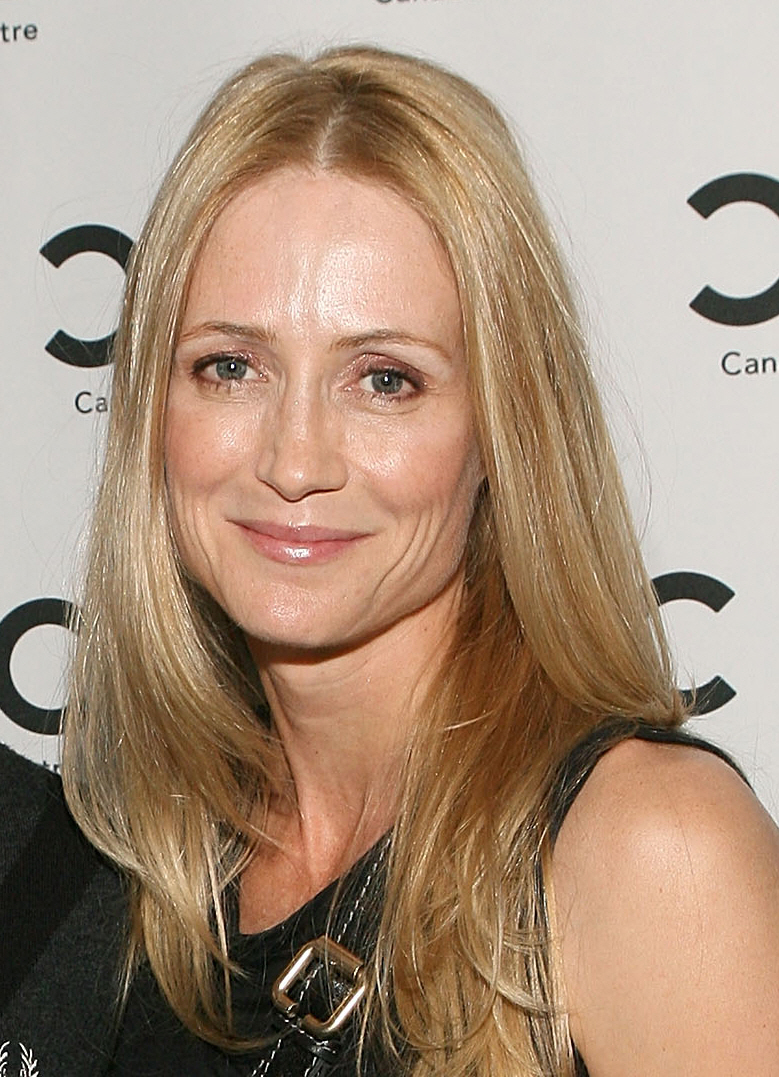
- Rowan in 2011
- Born: October 26, 1965 (age 60); Ottawa, Ontario, Canada
- Occupations: Actress; model
- Years active: 1984–2016
- Partner: David Thomson, 3rd Baron Thomson of Fleet (2007-2008) (1 child)
- Children: 1

Kelly Rowan (born October 26, 1965) is a former Canadian actress and model. A native of Ottawa, Rowan studied acting in London and New York City before she started working as a model. She was featured in the horror film The Gate (1987) before earning critical acclaim for her performance in the Canadian television film Adrift, for which she won a Gemini Award for Best Actress. After a lead role in Candyman: Farewell to the Flesh (1995), Rowan starred as Mattie Shaw on the series Lonesome Dove: The Outlaw Years (1995–1996).

Rowan went on to garner international fame for her portrayal of California real estate developer Kirsten Cohen on the American television series The O.C., which ran from 2003 to 2007. She had a leading role on the crime series Perception from 2012 to 2015.

== Early life ==
Rowan was born October 26, 1965, in Ottawa, Ontario, and is a graduate of Toronto's Northern Secondary School. She left the University of Western Ontario to pursue acting, and studied at the British American Drama Academy in the United Kingdom and at the Neighborhood Playhouse in New York City. While in New York, Rowan worked as a model to earn a living.

== Career ==
After studying acting and modeling in New York, Rowan went on to appear in films such as The Gate (1987), Hook (1991), Three to Tango (1999), and One Eight Seven (1997).

Rowan guest-starred in television series such as The Outer Limits, Growing Pains, Da Vinci's Inquest, CSI: Crime Scene Investigation and Dallas. In 1993, she won a Gemini Award for her work in the television movie Adrift. In 1995–96 she played Matty Shaw, a funeral parlor operator and gun smith, in the TV series Lonesome Dove: The Outlaw Years. In 2002, Rowan guest-starred in four episodes of Boomtown, playing "Marian", the deceived wife of David McNorris (Neal McDonough). In 2003, she was cast as Kirsten Cohen, a loving mother and businesswoman on Fox's teen drama series The O.C.. In 2006, she won a Prism Award for this role. From 2012 to 2015, she starred as Natalie Vincent in the TNT series, Perception.

Her credits as executive producer include the 2008 television film The Good Times Are Killing Me and the 2007 television film She Drives Me Crazy, which was her third project for Lifetime.

Rowan has volunteered as an actress with the Young Storytellers Foundation.

== Personal life ==
Rowan announced her engagement to David Thomson, 3rd Baron Thomson of Fleet in late June 2007. They broke off their engagement before Rowan, then age 42, gave birth to their daughter on April 28, 2008, in Los Angeles.

== Filmography ==
=== Film ===
Year	Title	Role	Notes
1985	My Pet Monster	Stephanie	Direct-to-video
1987	The Gate	Lori Lee	
1989	The Long Road Home	Cynthia	
1991	Hook	Peter's Mother	
1995	Candyman: Farewell to the Flesh	Annie Tarrant	
1995	Assassins	Jennifer	
1996	Mocking the Cosmos	Lydia / Lydathia	Short film
1997	One Eight Seven	Ellen Henry	
1999	Three to Tango	Olivia Newman	
2001	Proximity	Anne Conroy	
2001	Jet Boy	Erin	
2002	Greenmail	Ashley Pryor	Direct-to-video
2006	Mount Pleasant	Anne Burrows	
2008	Jack and Jill vs. the World	Kate	
2012	Rufus	Jennifer Wade	also known as Hunted

=== Television ===
Year	Title	Role	Notes
1984	Hangin' In	Karen	Episode: "The Party"
1986	The Truth About Alex	Ellie Sanders	Television movie
1986	Night Heat	Melissa	Episode: "Trapped"
1986	The High Price of Passion	Student #3	Television movie
1987	The Kidnapping of Baby John Doe	Salesgirl	Television movie
1987	Air Waves		Episode: "Dinner at Eight"
1988	Mount Royal		Episode: "Hello Stranger"
1988	War of the Worlds	Kim	Episode: "Goliath Is My Name"
1988	Another World	Suzie Strathmore	
1989	Street Legal	Angelina	Episode: "Beauties and Beasts"
1990	Growing Pains	Rachel	Episode: "Daddy Mike"
1991	Dallas	Dana	3 episodes
1992	Grave Secrets: The Legacy of Hilltop Drive	Gayla Williams	Television movie
1992	Exclusive	Sunny	Television movie
1992	Sweating Bullets	Julie Morrison	Episode: "Ocean Park"
1993	Adrift	Eliza Terrio	Television movie
1995	Black Fox: Good Men and Bad	Hallie Russell	Television movie
1995	The Outer Limits	Isabelle Pierce	Episode: "Virtual Future"
1995–1996	Lonesome Dove: The Outlaw Years	Mattie Shaw	Main role, 22 episodes
1997	The Burning Zone	Stacy	Episode: "The Last Five Pounds Are the Hardest"
1997	A Match Made in Heaven	Jane Cronin	Television movie
1998	The Outer Limits	Kristin	Episode: "In Another Life"
1998	When He Didn't Come Home	Carolyn Blair	Television movie
1998	Da Vinci's Inquest	Michaela	Episodes: "Little Sister: Parts 2 and 3"
1998	To Have & to Hold	Gina	Episode: "These Boots Were Made for Stalking"
1999	Late Last Night	Jill	Television movie
1999	Chicken Soup for the Soul	Mom	Episode: "The Handwriting on the Wall"
1999	Anya's Bell	Jeanne Rhymes	Television Movie
1999	A Crime of Passion	Marci Elias	Television Movie
2000	The Truth About Jane	Ms. Lynn Walcott	Television Movie
2000	Scorn	Sharon	Television Movie
2001	A Girl Thing	Claire	Television Movie
2001	Loving Evangeline	Evie Shaw	Television Movie
2001	CSI: Crime Scene Investigation	Eileen Nelson	Episode: "Slaves of Las Vegas"
2002	Rag and Bone	Karen Toms	Television movie
2002	The Man Who Saved Christmas	Mary	Television movie
2002–2003	Boomtown	Marian McNorris	4 episodes
2003–2007	The O.C.	Kirsten Cohen	Main role, 92 episodes
2005	Still I Long for Your Kiss		Music video from Peter Gallagher's album 7 Days in Memphis
2006	Eight Days to Live	Teresa Spring	Television movie
2007	In God's Country	Judith Leavitt	Television movie
2009	CSI: Miami	Katherine Faber	Episode: "Divorce Party"
2009	The Good Times Are Killing Me	Kate Derby	Television movie
2010	Flashpoint	Maggie Perrello	Episode: "Severed Ties"
2011	Cyberbully	Kris Hillridge	Television movie
2012–2015	Perception	Natalie Vincent / Dr. Caroline Newsome	Main role
2015	Castle	Dean Feller	Episode: "PhDead"
2015	Murdoch Mysteries	Mrs. Millicent McGowan	Episode: "A Merry Murdoch Christmas"
2016	Tulips in Spring	Caroline	Television movie
