= Summer Bummer (disambiguation) =

"Summer Bummer" is a song by Lana Del Ray, ASAP Rocky, and Playboi Carti.

Summer Bummer may also refer to:

- "Summer Bummer", an episode of The Fairly OddParents
- "Summer Bummer", an episode of Sister, Sister
- "Summer Bummer", an episode of The Powerpuff Girls
- "The Summer Bummer", an episode of The O.C.
- "Summer Bummer", a song by Benjamin Redman of Residual Kid
- Summer Bummer, an animated short by Bill Plympton
- June Gloom, also called "Summer Bummer"
