= The O.C. =

2003 American teen drama television series

- Title as seen in seasons 3 and 4
- Genre: Teen drama
- Created by: Josh Schwartz
- Starring: Peter Gallagher; Kelly Rowan; Ben McKenzie; Mischa Barton; Adam Brody; Chris Carmack; Tate Donovan; Melinda Clarke; Rachel Bilson; Alan Dale; Willa Holland; Autumn Reeser
- Opening theme: "California" by Phantom Planet
- Composers: Christopher Tyng; Richard Marvin
- Country of origin: United States
- Original language: English
- No. of seasons: 4
- No. of episodes: 92 (list of episodes)

Production
- Executive producers: Dave Bartis (season 1); Bob DeLaurentis; Doug Liman (season 1); McG; Stephanie Savage (season 4); Josh Schwartz
- Producers: Loucas George; John Stephens; Mike Kelley; David Calloway
- Production location: California
- Running time: 42 minutes
- Production companies: College Hill Pictures, Inc.; Wonderland Sound and Vision; Hypnotic (season 1); Warner Bros. Television

Original release
- Network: Fox
- Release: August 5, 2003 – February 22, 2007

The O.C. is an American teen drama television series created by Josh Schwartz that originally aired on Fox in the United States from August 5, 2003, to February 22, 2007, with a total of four seasons consisting of 92 episodes. The series title, "O.C.", is an initialism of Orange County, the location in Southern California in which the series is set.

The series centers on Ryan Atwood, a troubled yet gifted young teenager from a broken home who is adopted by the wealthy and philanthropic Sandy and Kirsten Cohen. Ryan and his adoptive brother Seth, a socially awkward, quick-witted teenager, deal with life as outsiders in the high-class world of Newport Beach. Ryan and Seth spend much time navigating their relationships with girl-next-door Marissa Cooper, Seth's childhood crush Summer Roberts, and the fast-talking loner Taylor Townsend. Storylines deal with the culture clash between the idealistic Cohen family and the shallow, materialistic, and closed-minded community in which they reside. The series includes elements of postmodernism, and functions as a mixture of melodrama and comedy.

The series premiered with high ratings and was one of the most popular new dramas of the 2003–2004 television season. It was widely referred to as a pop cultural phenomenon and received mostly positive reception from critics. However, ratings declined as the show went on. The low ratings led to its cancellation in early 2007.

The O.C. has been broadcast in more than 50 countries worldwide. The series has also been released on DVD as well as on iTunes and streaming services Hulu and HBO Max.

== Plot ==
The first season focuses on Ryan Atwood's arrival in Newport Beach to live with Sandy and Kirsten Cohen, who take him in after his mother kicks him out. A major theme of the first season is the culture shock Ryan feels as he adjusts from a life of domestic abuse and poverty to living in a superficial high-class society. He quickly befriends and bonds with Seth Cohen, and begins to have a romantic relationship with Marissa Cooper. Although coming from very different backgrounds, Ryan soon discovers that he deals with similar issues to his new peers, such as self-identity conflict and familial alienation. The relationship between Ryan and Marissa flourishes when he supports her through her parents' divorce. As the show progresses, Ryan takes a very protective role over Marissa, showing Ryan to be a much more stable, controlled person than originally portrayed. Other storylines include Seth's development from a friendless loner to having two romantic options in Summer and Anna, as well as the arrivals of Oliver Trask, a troubled teen who befriends Marissa during their coinciding therapy sessions, and Theresa Diaz, Ryan's close friend and former love interest from his hometown of Chino. Meanwhile, Sandy Cohen frequently comes into conflict with Caleb Nichol, Kirsten's father and a wealthy industrialist who is said to "basically own Newport."

The second season of The O.C. continues to follow the tumultuous romantic relationships between Ryan and Marissa, Seth and Summer, and Sandy and Kirsten. Josh Schwartz, the show's creator, stated that in the second season, the show would "no longer be about Ryan's past; now it's going to be about Ryan's future," and that this season would "slow down the storytelling a little bit ... and evolve the characters." For example, the story closely follows Ryan in his advanced physics class, where tension is created between him and another student, Lindsay, who presumes that Ryan will be useless as a lab partner, who thus prevents him from contributing to the work that must be submitted. Ryan's character begins to grow when he stands up to Lindsay and convinces her to allow him to contribute, forcing them to work together to complete the assignment. They later become involved romantically, creating extreme complications and relational shifts amongst the now "Cooper-Nichol" family. The Bait Shop becomes a prominent social destination for the teenage characters. A number of recurring characters are introduced, such as D.J., Lindsay Gardner, Zach Stevens, and Alex Kelly, with whom the main characters form a variety of relationships. Ryan's brother, Trey Atwood, gets out of jail and threatens to bring Ryan's old life into his new one. Sandy and Kirsten also face new conflicts after drifting apart during the summer. The second season ends with Marissa shooting Trey after Ryan confronts him for attempting to sexually assault Marissa.

The third season creates many dynamic changes with regards to relationships and power within the characters' society. Firstly, Marissa is expelled from the Harbor School. The Cooper family, left with little money, is forced to move into a trailer park. Julie Cooper-Nichol, once one of the richest women in all of Newport, struggles to put food on the table for her daughters. Marissa's life begins to spiral out of control, as she struggles with alcohol and drug abuse, as well as dealing with the loss of her close friend Johnny. Similarly, Kirsten confronts her alcohol addiction and eventually leaves rehab, only to encounter more problems when she begins business with a con artist. The other characters look towards college, with Seth and Summer competing for a spot at Brown University. Sandy's moral compass becomes imperiled when he takes over Caleb's old position as head of The Newport Group, pursuing a project to establish more low-income housing in Newport. Ryan also attempts to resolve his individual relationships with his mother, and with his childhood friend Theresa Diaz. He also pursues the idea of a post-secondary education, with encouragement from both Sandy and Kirsten to visit Berkeley. However, Ryan's life is quickly put on hold when, in the season 3 finale, Ryan decides to drive Marissa to the airport, and they are run off the road by Kevin Volchok, Marissa's most recent love affair gone wrong. In the last few minutes of the episode, Ryan pulls Marissa out from the burning car, only to watch her die in his arms.

The fourth and final season begins five months after Marissa's death in the car crash. Ryan starts the season in isolation as a broken, grieving man, seeking revenge on Volchok. With the help of Julie, both she and Ryan are able to track Volchok down in Mexico, and turn him in to federal officials. The continued love of the Cohen family and the company of the eccentric Taylor Townsend guide him back to the light. Meanwhile, Seth and Summer face the problems of a long-distance relationship as Summer leaves to attend college. The first half of the season focuses on the characters accepting the reality of Marissa's death. The second half focuses on the characters "finding themselves" while facing myriad identity crises. This final season contains multiple surprises, such as a new addition to the Cohen family, a visit to an alternate universe in which Sandy becomes mayor, and a natural disaster that leaves Newport devastated.

== Episodes ==
| Season | Episodes | Originally released | | U.S. viewers (in millions) |
| Season | Episodes | First released | Last released | U.S. viewers (in millions) |
|---|---|---|---|---|
| 1 | 27 | August 5, 2003 | May 5, 2004 | 9.48 |
| 2 | 24 | November 4, 2004 | May 19, 2005 | 7.44 |
| 3 | 25 | September 8, 2005 | May 18, 2006 | 5.83 |
| 4 | 16 | November 2, 2006 | February 22, 2007 | 3.96 |

== Cast and characters ==
Season 1 cast of The O.C. Standing, from left: Tate Donovan, Rachel Bilson, Melinda Clarke, Peter Gallagher, Kelly Rowan, Chris Carmack; seated, from left: Mischa Barton, Ben McKenzie, Adam Brody

- Peter Gallagher as Sandy Cohen, an idealistic public defender who takes in Ryan Atwood in the pilot episode, much to the dismay of his wife, Kirsten. He is the husband of Kirsten, the father of Seth Cohen, and the legal guardian of Ryan. Although he lives in an upper-class community, his politics are left-leaning and open-minded, causing friction between himself and the community. Gallagher described the character as a "leftie Jewish guy from the Bronx." Sandy deals with many conflicts throughout the series, such as trying to gain acceptance from his father-in-law while being financially supported by his wife, and raising two teenagers in a (sometimes) corrupting environment.
- Kelly Rowan as Kirsten Cohen, the former CFO of real estate company the Newport Group, Sandy's wife, and Seth's mother. Before she met Sandy, she dated and grew up with Jimmy Cooper, father of Marissa Cooper, with whom she remains friends. She has had trouble with alcohol, which was triggered by the failing deteriorating relationship between her and her father. Kirsten goes on to open a dating service with Julie, and become a mother of two at the end of the fourth season. The character's politics and lifestyle are conservative, a contrast to her husband. Rowan described the character as seemingly more "together" than herself during an interview.
- Ben McKenzie as Ryan Atwood, a troubled teenager from Chino who is brought into the privileged community of Newport Beach, California, after his mother, Dawn Atwood, throws him out of their family home. Ryan is subsequently taken in by his public defender, Sandy Cohen. He forms fast bonds with the entire Cohen family, especially Sandy's son Seth, in addition to the girl next door, Marissa Cooper. Ryan slowly finds his place within the new, materialistic society, and makes of the most of his situation by not only completing high school, but also continuing on to university. Casting director Patrick Rush found the role of Ryan particularly hard to cast and only invited McKenzie to an audition after Fox had made them aware of the young actor after his unsuccessful audition for a UPN sitcom. Rush said, "When Benjamin [McKenzie] came in, he wasn't physically what Josh had envisioned, but he inhabited the character unlike anyone we had seen. I think that the character of Ryan is a kid that always seems a little lost and has a sense of mystery and danger; Benjamin has all those qualities." Chad Michael Murray was originally offered the role of Ryan, but turned it down for the lead role of Lucas Scott on One Tree Hill.
- Mischa Barton as Marissa Cooper (seasons 1–3), Summer's best friend and Ryan's on-and-off love interest. Marissa is portrayed as a "spoiled girl who adjusts to being poor." Throughout the series, Marissa battles addictions to drugs and alcohol, including nearly killing herself on a trip to Mexico with her friends. Marissa's relationships with her parents, boyfriends, and classmates are often tumultuous. The casting director referred to Marissa as "a girl stuck in the trappings of her life who seemed older than her actual age." Barton left the series at the end of season three when her character was killed in a car accident. Commenting on her departure, Barton said, "My character has been through so, so much and there's really nothing more left for her to do."
- Adam Brody as Seth Cohen, the awkward adolescent son of Sandy and Kirsten Cohen. He is known for his quick quips, comic book fascination, and pop-culture references. Seth is also the love interest of Summer Roberts, on whom he had a crush since the third grade. Seth has been called a "Jewish nerd into obscure emo bands", who "starts dating a gorgeous, popular virgin." The New York Times characterized Seth as "eccentric and literate, Seth professes actual wanderlust [...] The show's press materials maintain that he's an existential hero along the lines of Holden Caulfield." Brody's portrayal of Seth was well received and is considered one of the overall highlights of the series.
- Chris Carmack as Luke Ward (season 1; special guest star season 2), Marissa's first boyfriend and regular cast member for most of the first season. Luke is initially the main antagonist of the series, coining the series' famous "Welcome to the O.C., bitch!" line during a fight with Ryan in the premiere episode. However, he later becomes the main "comic punching bag" for the other characters. Schwartz characterized the later Luke as "strumming a guitar being a goofball." Luke leaves Newport Beach to live with his father in Portland at the end of the first season.
- Tate Donovan as Jimmy Cooper (seasons 1–2; recurring season 3; special guest star season 4), Marissa and Kaitlin's father (and Julie's ex-husband). He gets in trouble for embezzlement and must face the consequences of his actions and its effect on his reputation and personal life. After his divorce from Julie, he pursues Hayley Nichol, Kirsten's younger sister, who eventually leaves him to further her fashion career in Japan. Jimmy's character made a brief appearance during season 3, but Jimmy was forced to leave town the morning of his wedding to Julie due to money problems. One interviewer characterized Jimmy as a "lovable deadbeat dad." Josh Schwartz has referred to the character as a "cat" in DVD commentaries. The character is portrayed as flighty and perpetually in financial debt despite warm relationships with his daughters. The character was ranked eighth on Entertainment Weekly's list of "TV's Worst Dads".
- Melinda Clarke as Julie Cooper, the mother of Kaitlin Cooper and Marissa Cooper. At the beginning of the show she is married to financial planner Jimmy Cooper. She is often characterized as being devious, selfish, and shallow. However, she reveals a more vulnerable and empathetic part of herself a number of times during the series. Clarke summarized her character as being "clearly just such a money-digging whore. To me, it's so funny now to see The Real Housewives of Orange County because you realize it exists and that's what Julie was. Julie was obviously the original housewife." Clarke went on to commend the character's "incredible arc", saying that Julie started as "this woman who was so superficial but, of course, she's not just one-dimensional, she's multi-dimensional. Starting in her pink Juicy sweat suit outfit and then by the end she's graduated from college and moving on with her life. She's a survivor."
- Rachel Bilson as Summer Roberts, a pretty and popular socialite who is the love interest of Seth and best friend to Marissa. Bilson's character was originally supposed to appear in only a few episodes, but quickly became popular amongst viewers, and ended up being part of the main cast for the rest of the series. When Summer's parents divorced, her mother abandoned the family and she has had no contact with her since. Her stepmother, nicknamed the "step-monster", is a lazy woman with a suggested drug problem. Summer has been referred to as a "seemingly snotty, superficial rich girl who is revealed to have hidden depth when she warms to the charms of nerdy Seth." She is the daughter of Dr. Neil Roberts. Summer later surprises audiences by turning out to be much more intellectually capable than imagined. She ends up being accepted to Brown, beating out many applicants from Harbour School, including, to his dismay, Seth. Not only intelligent, Summer proves to be an activist for animals while protesting against lab testing on animals and setting lab bunnies free. She later takes one as her own and names her Pancakes.
- Alan Dale as Caleb Nichol (season 2; recurring season 1), Kirsten's businessman father and later Julie Cooper's husband. His character recurs throughout the first season, and he becomes a regular during the second season, but comes to a sudden stop when his character suffers from a fatal heart attack during the second-season finale. The Chicago Tribune characterized Caleb as a "gruff, uncompromising Newport Beach, California, real-estate developer". When asked by the Tribune about the character, Dale said, "The thing that's lovely about this character is that there's so much to do with him. His relationships are so complicated, and once the marriage happened, everyone was related in the show. That means he's got all these people to relate to, and he relates so badly with everyone."
- Autumn Reeser as Taylor Townsend (season 4; recurring season 3), introduced in the third season as a neurotic perfectionist student. Many critics initially saw similarities between her and the character Tracy Flick from the 1999 film Election. Taylor begins the series as a villain before eventually becoming the second female lead in the fourth season. Reeser's performance was critically acclaimed. She reflected back on the character during a 2010 interview, saying, "I feel like there's a lot of girls out there who could really relate to her, who hadn't seen themselves on TV in that way. I loved that about her. I loved that she made no apologies for who she was even though she wasn't what all the magazines said was OK. She was like, "I'm still valid. And I'm awesome. And I know I'm odd, and that's OK."
- Willa Holland as Kaitlin Cooper (season 4; recurring seasons 1 and 3). The role was originally played by Shailene Woodley in a recurring role during the first season. Kaitlin spends much of the series at boarding school before returning on a recurring basis in the third season (now played by Holland) and finally becoming a regular character in the fourth season. The daughter of Jimmy and Julie and sister to Marissa, her personality is more similar to her mother's rather than her father's, and she is portrayed as a regular pot smoker and occasional dealer. Holland observed that "no one can control her" but that her arc in the fourth season finds the character maturing. When asked about any disappointment over the recast, Woodley responded, "I was 11 and I was on as a guest, recurring character, or whatever. My character went to boarding school and when they decided to bring her back, they actually re-auditioned me to bring her back. But I didn't go through puberty until late [...] So, there was no weirdness when Willa Holland got it because she was so obviously right for the role... and I was so obviously not [laughs]."

== Production ==
=== Conception ===
In 2002, creator Josh Schwartz met with Joseph "McG" McGinty Nichol and Stephanie Savage of production company Wonderland Sound and Vision. They told Schwartz they wanted to create a television show based in McG's hometown of Newport Beach, Orange County, California. Savage suggested producing a police or extreme sports 21 Jump Street-style show, but Schwartz knew little about the genre. Having had experiences with people from Newport Beach during his time at the University of Southern California, Schwartz came back to them with his own characters.

Schwartz pitched to studios a show portraying a romance between Lucy Muñoz—whose father worked on the wealthy Atwood family's Newport estate—and Ryan Atwood. Warner Bros. Television was interested, but because of other shows that year based on a white man-Latina woman Romeo and Juliet–like romance, asked for changes. Schwartz and Savage modified the pitch to what they later described as The Breakfast Club set in an Orange County gated community. The show was pitched to Fox in August 2002. The network targeted a summer launch for the show, and Doug Liman was brought in to direct the premiere after McG withdrew due to his scheduling conflicts with Charlie's Angels: Full Throttle. The show was confirmed for the 2003–2004 schedule in May, and an August 5, 2003, broadcast date was selected in June.

Schwartz later said that The O.C. was like a trojan horse: "The horse is a glossy nighttime soap in the tradition of Beverly Hills 90210, with bikinis and bonfires and fistfights at galas. The soldiers inside were our characters." He said that inspiration for them came from Larry Sanders, Cameron Crowe, and other "quirky character-driven shows like Freaks and Geeks, Undeclared, and My So-Called Life". At USC, Schwartz attended the School of Cinema-Television, and later said that The O.C. was "very much based on sort of the experiences I had when I was in college" as a "Jewish kid from the East Coast ... surrounded by all these kids from Newport Beach who were water-polo players, and these very blonde girls who only wanted to date them. I felt very much like an outsider." Although Orange County residents criticized the show's title, stating that people did not call the county by the phrase, Schwartz stated that USC students did say that they were from "The O.C." He also stated that Cohen family in season one resembles his own family life, adding that "The dynamic between Sandy and Seth is very much based on me and my dad." Schwartz reasoned that, "As much as our audience enjoys living vicariously in this wealthy world, I think the true wish fulfillment comes from wishing that they had a family like the Cohens — where the parents could be that cool and that grounded and that loving, but also real parents."

Schwartz said that he wrote the highly regarded pilot episode in his boxer shorts. "I had no idea what would come of it and there was just that purity to it." The script for the pilot attracted most of the regular cast to the project, including film star Peter Gallagher, who said of the pilot:

In that recently post-9/11 America, I read this script and thought it was astounding. I thought it was exactly the right story to be telling at that point in time. It was about a family living in a not very embracing community, one that doesn't necessarily share all their values. [...] they don't lose their sense of humor or their inclination to help. They still open their arms and embrace this outsider kid. And I thought that was powerful in an era with a kind of xenophobia, a kind of looking-over-your-shoulder and getting small and angry, sort of creeping into the PATRIOT Act–fueled environment. This espoused a kind of America... It just felt right. And it had a sense of humor.

=== Filming locations ===
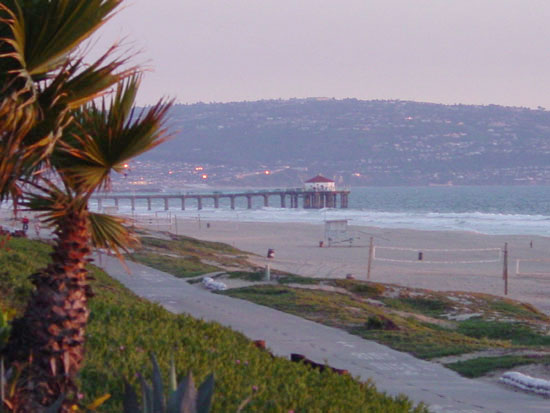
Manhattan Beach was one of the primary filming locations for the show.

Although the show is set in Newport Beach, financial penalties imposed for filming outside the studio zone meant much of the show was filmed in the Manhattan Beach, Los Angeles County region. Many of the beach scenes were also filmed in Hermosa Beach, Redondo Beach and Torrance. Sites in Los Angeles County were used for many different on-screen locations, which include Ryan's hometown of Chino, Luke's father's Portland home, Johnny's father's Indio office and Tijuana.

For the first episode, "Premiere", the Cohen family home was shot on location in Malibu. A mock pool house was built for use in the pilot, and taken down after filming completed. The Cohens' home was recreated on a soundstage at Raleigh Studios in Manhattan Beach for filming during the rest of the series; the pool was only 4-feet deep meaning that the cast had to act on their knees. External shots of the original house remained in use throughout the show. The pilot was shot on 35 mm film stock, while subsequent episodes used digitally post-processed 16 mm in order to reduce the cost of production.

The Harbor School is the local school that the show's adolescents attend. Based on Newport's Corona del Mar High School, which executive producer McG attended, the filming location was Mount St. Mary's College, a private woman's college in Brentwood, Los Angeles. The University of California, Los Angeles was the location used to represent Berkeley, and the University of Southern California was used to represent Brown University. The FAA First Federal Credit Union building in Hawthorne was used to depict the Newport Group in season two. Wayfarers Chapel in Rancho Palos Verdes was used three times on the show—twice for a wedding and once for a funeral. The Cohens' original home in Berkeley, which they return to in "The End's Not Near, It's Here", was shot in South Pasadena.

The restaurant dubbed the Crab Shack on the show is actually local landmark The Crab Cooker. Julie refers to the restaurant in a third-season episode by its real-life name. Scenes from the show were also shot at the landmark Wattles Mansion located in Hollywood.

=== The Cohen home ===
The Cohen household is a fictitious "McMansion" built by Caleb Nichol and The Newport Group. The house is based on two homes located in Malibu, California. The exterior shots of the front of the home and the driveway were filmed from a home on Ocean Breeze Drive in Malibu, California, built in 2002. This was filmed multiple times and used continuously for all four seasons. The interior, backyard, and infinity pool were filmed for the pilot episode in another home down the street also in Malibu. The pool house was built for the pilot episode. The interior, backyard, and pool house were rebuilt at Raleigh Studios in Manhattan Beach after the show was picked up to save on production costs.

=== Music ===
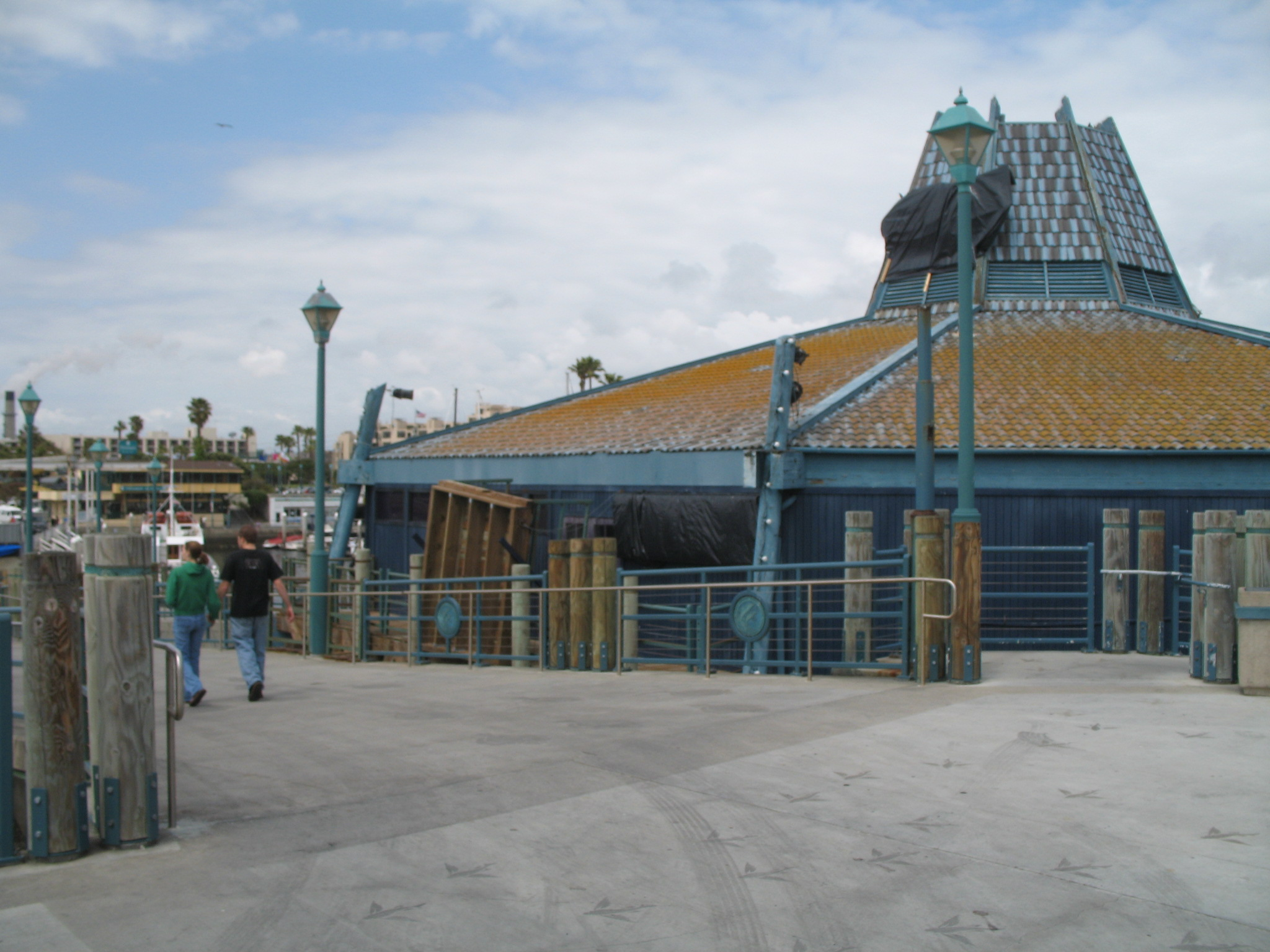
The Bait Shop, which was the fictional concert venue that staged performances in the second and third season

Alexandra Patsavas, who had previously worked on shows including Roswell and Carnivàle, was appointed as music supervisor on The O.C.. Patsavas worked alongside creator Josh Schwartz, in selecting the music to be used. Schwartz said that he had "always intended that music be a character on the show" The O.C. made indie rock a "main focus of the series" and also its marketing plan, releasing six soundtracks throughout the series. In the second season, a fictional new night club and concert venue, called The Bait Shop, was introduced. Bands including the Walkmen, the Killers, Modest Mouse, the Thrills, Rachael Yamagata, Death Cab for Cutie and the Subways all made guest appearances on the show performing at the venue. In addition to having guest artists perform on the show, it also premiered many new music singles from artists including the Beastie Boys, U2, Beck, Coldplay, Gwen Stefani, and the Shins.

Many bands gained exposure through the show, which caused an increase in sales of their music. Rooney, who were the first band to guest appear on the show, experienced a "200 percent increase in sales" after their appearance. Even artists who just had their songs featured benefited: Imogen Heap became "a household name stateside," and Youth Group, who recorded a song specifically for the show, had "more than 5,000 iTunes downloads [of that track] in its first week" following it being played. However, not all bands were keen to feature on the show. Clap Your Hands Say Yeah were asked to perform, but they turned it down because they were worried that it could diminish their credibility. Some fans and critics echoed that sentiment by stating that such appearances and mass marketing techniques are creating sell-outs.

Generally the music was well received. Ben Spier from Entertainment Weekly described the show as a "mixtaper's dream" and Rolling Stone commented that the soundtrack was the reason people kept watching the show. However, Karyn L. Barr from Entertainment Weekly stated that using acts like U2 on a show that dedicated time to indie bands was "selling out." Noah Davis of PopMatters.com criticized the show for neglecting plotlines and replacing them with "the gang's countless trips to the Bait Shop."

== Themes ==
The series touches on themes such as inter-generational conflict, social class, social mobility, social alienation, sexual performance anxiety, hope, loneliness, virginity, emotional insecurity, environmentalism, alcoholism, drug addiction, gambling addiction, mental illness, homophobia, bisexuality, May–December romances, teen pregnancy, political activism, and eventually death and the acceptance of loss. These topics are examined through both lighthearted comedy and heightened operatic drama.

=== Chrismukkah ===
Within the series, Seth Cohen has a Jewish father and a Protestant (Presbyterian) mother. As a way to merge the two religions, Seth claims to have "created Chrismukkah" when he was six years old. The series included annual Chrismukkah episodes for every season of its run. Particulars of when exactly the holiday was celebrated were not given; Seth simply said in the first season's Chrismukkah episode that it was "eight days of presents, followed by one day of many presents." Chrismukkah later received mention in the television series Grey's Anatomy.

In December 2011, the pop-culture website The A.V. Club reviewed all four Chrismukkah episodes for its "TV Club Advent Calendar." The writer noted, "When thinking back on holiday specials of yore for this project, the first thing that popped into my head wasn't nostalgia for my Rankin/Bass- and Chuck Jones-filled youth. Instead, I immediately focused on a much more recent obsession: Chrismukkah. Created by The O.C.'s Seth Cohen ...." The reviewer continued, saying that "A thread of underlying sadness unites all four Chrismukkah episodes, but it's a sadness that begs to be redeemed by the end of the hour. Chrismukkah is really about traditional Christmas togetherness and your standard happy ending; it's the everyday miracle of people coming together to create something magical." Entertainment Weekly also ranked the episodes. The show helped popularise the term as an actual holiday in mainstream media.

=== Meta-fictional humor ===
Several episodes feature a fictional show-within-the-show called The Valley, an in-show equivalent to The O.C. The Valley, like The O.C., has a fictional reality TV counterpart, Sherman Oaks: The Real Valley, which causes Seth to ask, "Why watch the plight of fictional characters when you can watch real people in contrived situations?" The second season also focuses on the creation of a fictional comic book called Atomic County, written by Seth Cohen, that is used for similar self-deprecating purposes.

The Valley and Atomic County are used throughout the series to comment on aspects of the show itself, such as message board criticism of the show's reliance on love triangles, the trope of mid-twenties actors portraying teenagers, and the inability of the series to be renewed for another season. In addition, several of the characters talk as if they are aware that they are in a television series. One episode in the second season finds Seth commenting that "we tried some new things," but that "last year was just better," echoing response from fans that the second season was inferior to the first.

USA Today remarked that The O.C.'s "undertone of sarcasm and self-parody' was one of the aspects of the series that made it compelling. Writer Ken Barnes opined that The O.C. took "meta-TV" to its "sublime peak" with The Valley. He continued, saying that the "device allowed producers and writers to have fun mocking critical and public perceptions of The OC, its supposed soap-operatic excesses and pop-culture obsessions. In the book Stop Being A Hater and Learn to Love the O.C., Alan Sepinwall noted that "Schwartz spends enough of his day trolling message boards to know exactly what fans are complaining about and which references to other shows and movies they've caught, and he incorporates it into his scripts."

An entire chapter of the book is devoted to perceived self-mockery within the series, with much attention given to the episode "The L.A." from Season One. Producer Allan Heinberg said that many instances of meta-commentary had to be cut if the network or Schwartz felt they had gone too far, saying that "Sandy at one point had a speech about the Golden Globes that we felt was maybe a little inside." Schwartz similarly declined a request to have The O.C. actors portray themselves on Arrested Development, another FOX show set in Orange County.

== Broadcast and distribution ==
=== First run broadcast ===
The first season premiered at 9:00 p.m. (EDT) on August 5, 2003, on Fox, and was simulcast in Canada on CTV. The original, English-language version of the show also aired in other continents. In the United Kingdom, the first episode was aired at 9:00 p.m. (GMT) on March 7, 2004, on Channel 4, but subsequent episodes were first shown on sister station E4, a week in advance of being shown on Channel 4. In Australia, the pilot was first broadcast on the Nine Network but the channel later dropped the show. Network Ten picked up the show and by the fourth season was airing episodes within days of it being broadcast in the U.S. In New Zealand, the show was aired on TV2, and in Ireland it was broadcast on TG4. In South Africa it premiered on April 1, 2004, on satellite television channel Go and was shown on terrestrial channel SABC 3 in December 2006. In India, the English-language channel Zee Café debuted the show on December 30, 2005. For the fourth season, in the week before an episode was broadcast on television, it was available via on demand streaming through Fox Interactive Media's MySpace and MyFoxLocal stations.

It was also aired in non-English speaking countries. It aired across Latin America on the Warner Channel, in Brazil the show premiered on November 3, 2003 and the last episode was aired on April 12, 2007. It was also broadcast on the SBT television network under the name O.C. – Um Estranho no Paraíso was broadcast between 2004 and 2009. In addition to being broadcast by the versions of the Brazilian terrestrial television channels Glitz (2012–2013), VH1 (2012) and MTV (2013–2014). In France, it aired on France 2 under the name Newport Beach. It aired in Germany on ProSieben, in Switzerland on SF zwei, and in Russia under the name OC – Lonely Hearts on STS. In Italy it was shown on Italia 1, with pay-per view channel Joi being the first to make available episodes of the third season onwards through the digital terrestrial television service Mediaset Premium. In Poland the series was broadcast under the local title Życie Na Fali on TVN in 2006 and 2007 in a daytime block from Monday to Friday at 2:00 p.m. with single episodes attracting up to a million viewers. Then, it was also repeated on TVN7.

=== Cancellation ===
Due to low ratings, it was rumored that the show would not return for a fifth season. In June 2006, Fox confirmed that "the current order for The O.C. is 16 episodes", but added that there was a chance to add more installments. In September 2006, Rachel Bilson said that she felt like "the show is over", and co-star Kelly Rowan stated that many of the cast realized the show was close to being cancelled. Rowan said that "when [the fourth season] was picked up for just 16 episodes this year the cast had a feeling the end was near."

On January 3, 2007, Fox announced that The O.C. was to be cancelled. In a statement, Schwartz said "This feels like the best time to bring the show to its close" adding that "what better time to go out than creatively on top." Fox launched an official campaign on their website called Save The O.C., which garnered over 740,000 signatures. There were rumors that the show would be saved by the CW. The CW president Dawn Ostroff confirmed in January 2007 that while the move was discussed, it was decided against.

The main reason for the cancellation was the decline in ratings. Many media outlets have reported that the main factor behind this drop was the death of the lead character, Marissa Cooper. As one of the show's central figures, her departure alienated many fans. Her tragic death in a car accident was seen as the beginning of the end for this teen drama.

=== Syndication ===
The O.C. was syndicated on Soapnet from 2007 until 2012 in the United States, and the series began airing on Pop in 2016. The show became available for streaming on CW Seed in 2015, and Hulu in 2016. In 2020, it was taken off of Hulu for rival streaming service Max.

=== Media releases ===
All four seasons are available on DVD in Regions 1, 2 and 4.

| Season | DVD | Release date |
|---|---|---|
| Season 1 | The O.C. – The Complete First Season | October 26, 2004 |
| Season 2 | The O.C. – The Complete Second Season | August 23, 2005 |
| Season 3 | The O.C. – The Complete Third Season | October 24, 2006 |
| Season 4 | The O.C. – The Complete Fourth and Final Season | May 22, 2007 |

The O.C. The Complete Series was released on November 27, 2007, in Canada and the United States, which included the first season remastered in widescreen. The complete series was also released as a Region 2 DVD on November 19, 2007, but did not include the remastered version of the first season. Additionally, the boxset included a note from Josh Schwartz, a printed conversation between Josh Schwartz and Stephanie Savage, two rare bonus discs, a season four gag reel, and Atomic County excerpts.

For registered members of selected regional iTunes Stores, the complete series is available to purchase and download. These seasons are also available in the US as video on demand from Amazon Video. The fourth season was also made available in the Zune.

== Reception ==
=== Critical reception ===
Critical response of The O.C.
| Season | Rotten Tomatoes | Metacritic |
|---|---|---|
| 1 | 77 (30 reviews) | 67 (17 reviews) |
| 2 | 86 (14 reviews) | —N/a |
| 3 | 50 (6 reviews) | —N/a |
| 4 | 59 (17 reviews) | —N/a |

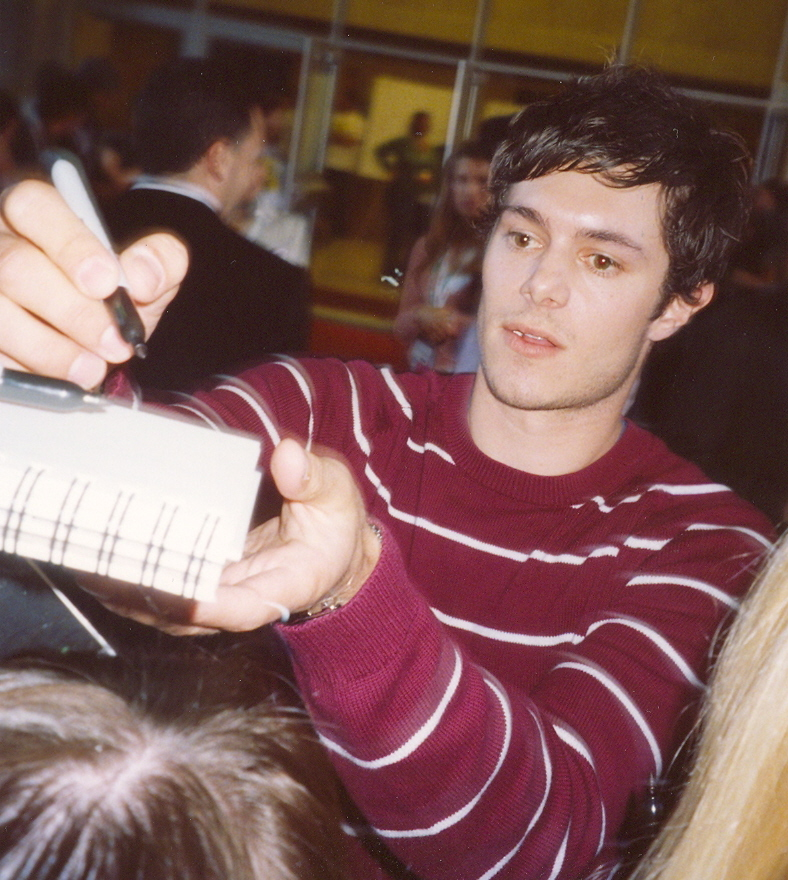
Adam Brody's performance as Seth Cohen was held in high regard by fans and critics.

Season one of The O.C. received generally positive reviews from critics and is frequently regarded as the best season. Upon the show's premiere, Gael Fashingbauer Cooper of MSNBC described Ryan and Seth's friendship as "the most promising plot". The New York Times noted that "Mr. Schwartz pulled it off, sneaking a truly smart show past the gatekeepers in the guise of something commercial and trashy and fun." The reviewer also praised how the show "steered clear of both Aaron Spelling-style camp and the soggy earnestness that often characterises teen drama" and praised the integration of the adult cast into the plotlines. IGN called it "far more engaging and interesting" than its predecessors in the teen genre. The reviewer pointed to the show's sense of humor and respect for its audience, praising the series as "very funny" and "well-acted", while referring to Mischa Barton as the weak link. Time Magazine critic James Poniewozik was fond of the premiere episode, saying that the show "looks to have enough heart, talent and wit to generate a few seasons' worth of luxurious suds. As Ryan would say, in the teen-soap business, being 100% original doesn't make you smart. Delivering a formula with so much style and believability that it feels new again—that does."

Despite much positive reception, the first season was not without some criticism. San Jose Mercury News criticized the plot and the casting, saying that "the storylines usually involve the obligatory three-episode-arc drug problems or lost virginity with dialogue designed to keep a dog up to speed," and that "Whoever at FOX thought Benjamin McKenzie could pass for anything younger than 25 should be fired."

The second season was widely regarded as inferior to the first, but still received generally positive reception. IGN noted that the second season contains some of the best moments of the series and praised the bisexual romance between Alex and Marissa. It was said to have "managed to surpass its ratings ploy outer trappings to actually work as one of the better Marissa plotlines, at least initially, by doing a solid job of portraying her "I've never done this before..." confusion and excitement." Another review praised episodes "The Chrismukkah That Almost Wasn't" and "The Rainy Day Woman" as standout quality hours of the series and praised the storyline that focused on Sandy and Kirsten's marriage.

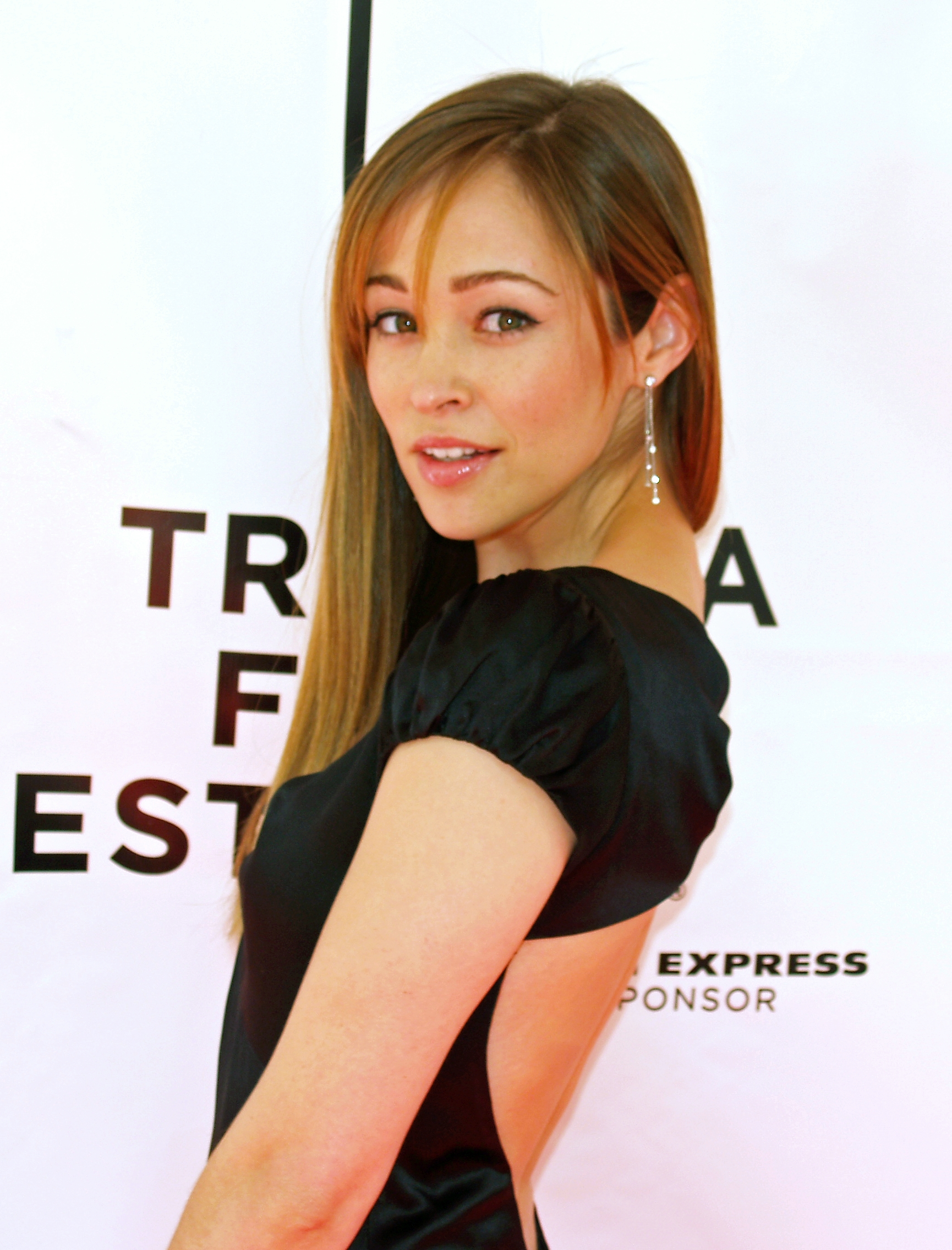
Autumn Reeser's performance as Taylor Townsend was frequently singled out as a highlight of the third and fourth seasons.

In contrast to the first two, Season 3 of the series was met with mostly negative reception. After the eventual cancellation of the show, Schwartz admitted that "the whole first half of the third season was a total mess." IGN faulted a season which, in their opinion, had "far too much time and too many episodes spent with the less than beloved character Johnny." IGN also noted that "Kirsten and Sandy both suffered from unsatisfying stories," and that the departure of character Caleb Nichol had been a mistake "as he had been a great character to bounce off both of the elder Cohens." In September 2007, Schwartz admitted in an interview for New York that the show "went down the wrong road" with Johnny. In 2023, he said "We lost our sense of irony, our sense of fun. We became the type of melodrama we would have made fun of in Season 1." The season did, however, receive some praise. The new character Taylor Townsend was stated as being "played to perfection by Autumn Reeser" and her character was described as "one of the greatest elements of The O.C." Jeffrey Robinson of DVD Talk described the storylines as "very intelligent and also incorporate a great deal of humor to keep your interest." While looking back on the series in an interview for the complete series box-set, Schwartz explained that "somewhere around Season 3, for reasons too numerous to discuss, I lost focus. The network wasn't really supporting the show." Schwartz went on to say that the third season was probably "the most important season, because it's where I learned the most. About television, about myself as a writer, about discipline and trying to hold onto your focus even if you're hearing a lot of opinions or being forced to add things creatively that you don't agree with. And I don't think Season 4 would have been as fun or as adventurous or as weird and zany and ultimately emotional if it weren't for that experience."

The final season is generally regarded by fans and critics as a return to form for the series. Variety's Josef Adalian said that "[the show] is once again in great creative shape." He added that "the scripts are snappy, the plots make sense, the acting's solid, [and] the music is appropriately indie" but criticized Fox for "throwing away" the show by giving it the Thursday 9:00 p.m. timeslot. Buddytv.com praised the season premiere, saying "this episode is the best OC episode since the show's first season. The absence of Mischa Barton character of Marissa Cooper is the best thing that's happened to The OC in a long time. The cast is now exceptional from top to bottom and the show is, at least in the first episode, much darker in tone than the first three seasons. This is a good sign." Later in the season, Buddytv.com lamented that "The OC is winding down, in all likelihood, and it's a shame. The show is hitting its creative stride just now, in its fourth season, and no one cares." Critic Alan Sepinwall said of the premiere, "Damn. That was... not bad. No, better than that. That was good. Confident, in character, funny on occasion (any scene with Che), genuinely touching at others (the comic book store intervention), really the most like itself the show has felt in a long time, maybe even going back to season one." In a review of a later episode, Sepinwall related that the fourth season was a "resurgent season" and that "every "O.C." episode review just turns into a list of things I liked."

Belinda Acosta of The Austin Chronicle agreed, praising the show's "new energy" and its ability to successfully cover "the transition between high school and college that other series have stumbled over." Entertainment Weekly's Ken Tucker commented that the fourth season was "a succession of terrific subplots" and praised new main cast member Taylor "as a fine, funny love interest for Ryan." Greg Elwell of DVD Talk described Bullit as "the breakout character of the season" but commented that the season's "dark opening (...) didn't do much to keep viewers around." IGN's Eric Goldman was also critical, saying that "as amusing as Che was, his inclusion into some later episodes gets a bit tired." Goldman also commented that "the second half of Season 4 wasn't quite as solid as the first [half]"; however, he added that while the fourth season had to prove itself again as an enjoyable watch "Josh Schwartz rose to this challenge (...) once again creating a show that was witty and self-aware."

=== U.S. television ratings ===
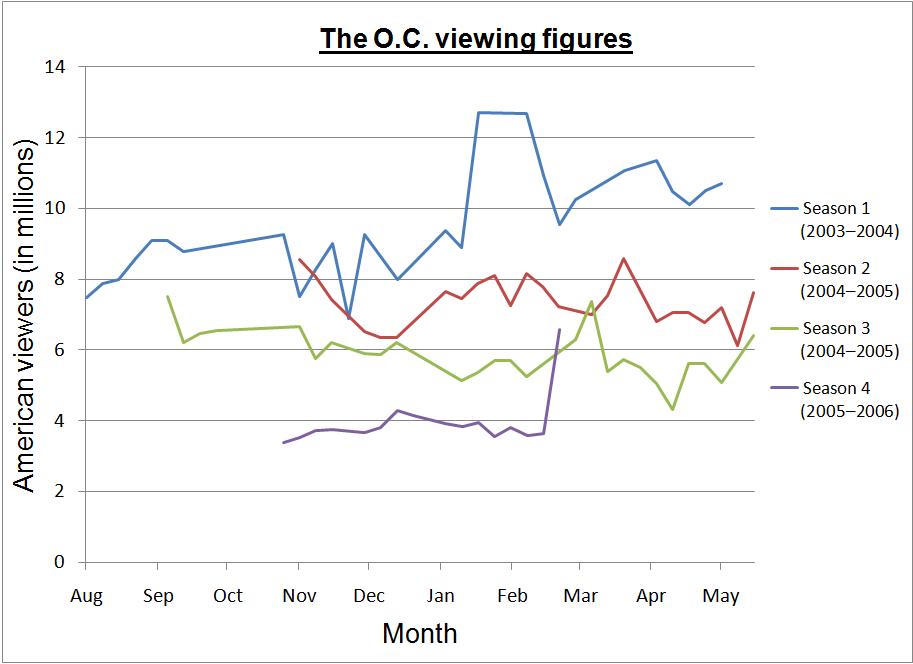
A line graph showing the U.S. television ratings for The O.C.

The pilot episode attracted 7.46 million viewers in the United States, came second in its time slot behind the season finale of Last Comic Standing, and was the highest rated show of the night in the 12–17-year-old demographic. The most watched O.C. episode was "The Rivals", the seventeenth episode of season one. It attracted 12.72 million viewers, and was the lead-out to American Idol, which attracted 29.43 million viewers that week. The O.C. was the highest-rated new drama of the 2003–2004 season among adults aged 18 to 34, averaging a total of 9.7 million viewers.

For the second season, the show moved to an "ultra-competitive Thursday" timeslot against the likes of Survivor, Joey and Will & Grace. This is often cited as a cause of The O.C.'s decline in popularity. The move improved Fox's performance at the new time slot, but lost the show viewers, as average viewing figures decreased thirty percent from the previous season to 7 million.

For the third season, average viewing figures decreased a further twenty percent from the previous season to 5.6 million. The Thursday 9.00 pm timeslot placed the show against two other popular shows, CSI and Grey's Anatomy.

The fourth season premiered in November 2006 with very little promotion or advertisements from FOX, and was once again in the Thursday timeslot. The premiere episode attracted 3.4 million viewers, which was a series low. For the series finale, 6.7 million viewers tuned in. This was 76 percent more than the season average of 4.6 million viewers.

| Season | Episodes | Timeslot (ET) | Season premiere | Season finale | TV season | Rank | Viewers (millions) |
|---|---|---|---|---|---|---|---|
| 1 | 27 | Tuesday 9:00 p.m. (2003); Wednesday 9:00 p.m. (2003–04) | August 5, 2003 | May 5, 2004 | 2003–04 | 57 | 9.69 |
| 2 | 24 | Thursday 8:00 p.m. | November 4, 2004 | May 19, 2005 | 2004–05 | 98 | 6.86 |
| 3 | 25 | Thursday 8:00 p.m. (2005); Thursday 9:00 p.m. (2006) | September 8, 2005 | May 18, 2006 | 2005–06 | 127 | 5.60 |
| 4 | 16 | Thursday 9:00 p.m. | November 2, 2006 | February 22, 2007 | 2006–07 | 190 | 4.28 |

=== Awards and honors ===
For the debut episode, "Premiere", Schwartz received a Writers Guild of America Award nomination for Best Screenplay in an Episodic Drama, and casting directors Rush and Silverberg nominated in the Dramatic Pilot category of the Artios Awards. Luke's declaration in the premiere episode of "Welcome to the O.C., bitch" was placed 83rd by TV Land in its 100 Greatest TV Quotes and Catchphrases in 2006. The first season picked up four Teen Choice Awards, and was nominated for another two. Additionally it was nominated for the Outstanding New Program TCA Award, and in Australia it won a Logie Award for Most Popular Overseas Program in 2005. For the second season the show was nominated for five Teen Choice Awards, and won four of them, including best drama. It was nominated for the Favorite Television Drama People's Choice Award, and Kelly Rowan won a PRISM Award for Performance in a Drama Series Episode, with Peter Gallagher getting a nomination. The second-season finale was nominated for a PRISM TV Drama Series Episode award. The third season was nominated for five Teen Choice Awards and won four of them, including "Choice Drama/Action Adventure Show" and "Choice Actor: Drama/Action Adventure," which Adam Brody won for the third consecutive year.

=== Legacy ===
Schwartz said in 2023 that Marissa died in the third season because many online fans by then disliked her storyline, and the network wanted to kill a main character to increase ratings:

The night that the show aired, we heard from a whole other swath of the audience that loved the show, watched every week, didn't feel the need to log into a forum to analyze it. For a lot of people, Marissa was the character they were watching for, Mischa was the actress they found the most exciting and Ryan and Marissa were endgame. We violated that in one fell swoop. It's now part of the legacy of the show. We've had to accept it.

The O.C. popularized its setting, Orange County, and led to copycats like MTV's reality show Laguna Beach: The Real Orange County and the Bravo documentary series The Real Housewives of Orange County, and its success as a prime-time soap opera helped Marc Cherry get Desperate Housewives on the air. The show generated a dedicated and thriving international fan community. DVD Verdict said, "The O.C. has become one of those rare shows whose influence has begun to extend far beyond the television screen, and has actually started to take an active role in shaping American teenage pop culture." Fans of the show, sometimes dubbed OC Groupies, have been active in developing a large number of fan websites and forums dedicated to the program. Famous fans of the show include the Bush twins, Jenna and Barbara, and Princess Beatrice. Additionally, actual UC Berkeley students created in 2004 the Sandy Cohen Public Defender Fellowship in honor of Peter Gallagher's character Sandy Cohen. The fellowship is awarded to students who plan to work as public defenders and has been presented by Gallagher.

Comedy group the Lonely Island created a parody of The O.C. called The 'Bu. At Boston College, students created and produced a parody titled "The BC" that received nationwide acclaim and was featured in The New York Times and CBS Evening News. On April 14, 2007, Saturday Night Live aired a Digital Short titled "Dear Sister" that satirized the final scene of The O.C.'s second-season finale. The short became popular enough to beget a wave of re-enactments and parodies using "Hide and Seek" with the music set to slow-motion scenes of violence from various films and television series. In 2020, the Netflix show Outer Banks was compared to The O.C. by publications such as Glamour.

Marvel described Runaways (created for television by Schwartz and Savage) as The O.C. of the Marvel Universe, even before they hired Schwartz and Savage to run the series.

Independent Washington University in St. Louis newspaper Student Life said that, "The O.C.'s" legacy will live on through its viewers. Whether you wear a 'Save Marissa' shirt, a leather wristcuff or hoodie in honor of Ryan or listen to Death Cab for Cutie, as Seth did, know that "The O.C." was a cultural phenomenon that will not be forgotten."

== Complementary media ==
The characters and setting of The O.C. have appeared in several official tie-ins outside of the television broadcast, including in print and on the Internet.

=== Novels ===
Eight novelizations have been released by the publisher Scholastic Inc. with the permission of Warner Bros. & Fox. They are:

- The Outsider (ISBN 0439660599)
- The Misfit (ISBN 0141319089)
- The Way Back (ISBN 0439677025)
- Spring Break (ISBN 0439696321)
- Summer of Summer (ISBN 043969633X)
- Bait & Switch (ISBN 0439745705)
- 'Twas the Night Before Chrismukkah (ISBN 0-439-7457-13)
- Cohen! (ISBN 0439745721)

With the exception of 'Twas the Night Before Chrismukkah, written by Andes Hruby, all the books were written by authors Cory Martin and Aury Wallington. An official biography book titled Meet The O.C. Superstars (ISBN 0-4396-60602), written by Monica Rizzo, was also published.

Several unofficial books relating to the show have also been published.

- O.C. Undercover (ISBN 0312331428), written by Brittany Kemp, published by Plexus Publishing Ltd., is a book that includes biographies of the cast, fashion tips, and information about culture trends associated with the show.
- Stop Being a Hater and Learn to Love The O.C. (ISBN 1596090065), written by Alan Sepinwall and published by Chamberlain Bros., discusses the merits of the television program, and aims to give a lighthearted view from all ages of the show.

=== International versions ===
| Country | Local title | Channel | Dates aired |
|---|---|---|---|
| Thailand | City of Light: The O.C. Thailand | One31 | March 8, 2016 – May 17, 2016 |
| Turkey | Medcezir ('tide') | Star TV | September 13, 2013 – June 12, 2015 |

==== Turkish adaptation ====
A Turkish adaptation, named Medcezir ('tide'), was created in 2013 and aired on Star TV. The first season consisted of 38 episodes. It features young Turkish artists Çağatay Ulusoy and Serenay Sarıkaya.

==== Thai adaptation ====
A Thai adaptation, named City of Light: The O.C. Thailand, was created in 2016 and aired on One 31. The first season consisted of 21 episodes. It features young Thai artists Chaiyapol Julien Poupart and Marie Broenner.

=== Licensed merchandise ===
Several types of products based on the series, such as clothes, toys and games, have been licensed for release. Licensed items of clothing released included T-shirts, jumpers, underwear and flip-flops, which are sold from the 20th Century Fox store. Other accessories available included keychains, notepads and a Chrismukkah wrapping paper. An official bath set and "OC Beauty To Go Cooling Set" was released in 2004.

AMC Beauty released fragrances in October 2006, named "The O.C. for Him" and "The O.C. for Her" in 0.5oz and 1.7oz versions. LeSportsac, in a partnership with Fox, released The O.C. collection" in August 2006, which was a fashion line of bags and accessories.

Screenlife Games and Mattel launched an O.C. themed version of Scene It?, a DVD trivia game based on the first three seasons. Cardinal Games released The OC Game, another trivia board game. In 2006, Gameloft released a mobile game based on the show.

A partnership with Sephora included one of their beauty editors writing on the official OC Insider site, and the inclusion of articles about their products. TheOCInsider.com and Starbrand.tv also included comprehensive guides of fashion and styles featured on the show, providing details to customers of how to obtain these items.

=== Spin-offs ===
The O.C. has given rise to a number of spin-offs, some developed and others not. Atomic County was a spin-off based on the cartoon characters in Seth's comic book of the same name. It was created by The O.C. writer John Stephens and artist Eric Wight, who was responsible for the comic book drawings featured on the show.

In 2005, Schwartz announced he was writing a spin-off which followed the life of Marissa's younger sister Kaitlin at boarding school. It was set to premiere in January 2006, but the airing of the spin-off never occurred. Schwartz attributed this to Gail Berman, president of Fox Broadcasting Company, moving to Paramount in May 2005.

There were plans to turn the show into something of a reverse spin-off. Schwartz planned to release a spin-off of his series Gossip Girl entitled Valley Girls, originally to premiere in the fall of 2009. Schwartz wanted to tie in the younger versions of the characters from both The O.C. and the principals from Valley Girls to establish a continuity with Gossip Girl.

The O.C. Musical took place on August 30, 2015, at the Montalban Theater in Los Angeles, selling out in minutes when tickets went on sale earlier that same month. While not officially authorized by FOX or Warner Bros. TV, Sucker Love Productions' musical was supported by the show's cast and producers, with Autumn Reeser portraying Julie Cooper and briefly reprising her role as Taylor Townsend for the first time in 8 years. Creator Josh Schwartz and stars Rachel Bilson, Melinda Clarke, and Kelly Rowan also reunited at the musical. The cast included Awkward star Greer Grammer as Summer Roberts and Pretty Little Liars star Brendan Robinson as Seth Cohen.
