= List of The O.C. characters =

The first main cast: top row (L-R) Donovan, Bilson, Clarke, Gallagher, Rowan & Carmack; bottom row (L-R) Barton, McKenzie & Brody.

The O.C. is an American television series created by Josh Schwartz for the FOX network in 2003. Schwartz serves as executive producer while also writing and directing for the show, including the premieres and finales of all seasons.

The show began with seven main characters which eventually became nine by the end of the first season. Since then, characters from the first season have left the show, with new main characters having been both written in and out of the series. Originally, it follows the life of Ryan Atwood, a troubled but tough young man from a broken home who is adopted by the wealthy and philanthropic Sandy and Kirsten Cohen. Ryan and his surrogate brother Seth, a socially awkward yet quick-witted teenager, deal with life as outsiders in the high-class world of Newport Beach. Ryan and Seth spend much time navigating their relationships with girl-next-door Marissa Cooper and Seth's childhood crush Summer Roberts.

== Cast timeline ==
Main cast (opening credits)
Recurring guest star (3+ episodes)
Guest star (1–2 episodes)

| Actor | Character | Seasons | | | |
| Actor | Character | 1 | 2 | 3 | 4 |
Main cast members
| Peter Gallagher | Sandy Cohen | Main | Main | Main | Main |
| Kelly Rowan | Kirsten Cohen | Main | Main | Main | Main |
| Benjamin McKenzie | Ryan Atwood | Main | Main | Main | Main |
| Mischa Barton | Marissa Cooper | Main | Main | Main | |
| Adam Brody | Seth Cohen | Main | Main | Main | Main |
| Tate Donovan | Jimmy Cooper | Main | Main | Recurring | Guest |
| Chris Carmack | Luke Ward | Main (Note: Carmack is credited with the guest cast in "Premiere" (ep. 1.1), before being added to the opening credits from "The Model Home" (ep. 1.2).) | Guest | | |
| Melinda Clarke | Julie Cooper | Main (Note: Clarke and Bilson are initially recurring before being added to the opening credits from "The Countdown" (ep. 1.14).) | Main | Main | Main |
| Rachel Bilson | Summer Roberts | Main | Main | Main | Main |
| Alan Dale | Caleb Nichol | Recurring | Main | | |
| Autumn Reeser | Taylor Townsend | | | Recurring | Main |
| Willa Holland | Kaitlin Cooper | Recurring (Note: Shailene Woodley initially plays Kaitlyn on a recurring basis during the first season.) | | Recurring | Main |
Recurring cast members
| Daphne Ashbrook | Dawn Atwood | Guest | | Recurring | |
| Bradley Stryker | Trey Atwood | Guest | | | |
| Logan Marshall-Green | Trey Atwood | | Recurring | Guest | |
| Ashley Hartman | Holly Fischer | Recurring | | | Recurring |
| Kim Oja | Taryn Baker | Recurring | Guest | Guest | Guest |
| Samaire Armstrong | Anna Stern | Recurring | | Guest | |
| Bonnie Somerville | Rachel Hoffman | Recurring | | | |
| Rosalind Chao | Dr. Kim | Recurring | | Recurring | |
| Navi Rawat | Theresa Diaz | Recurring | Guest | Recurring | |
| Brian McNamara | Carson Ward | Guest | Guest | | |
| Wayne Dalglish | Brad Ward | Guest | | | Recurring |
| Corey Price | Eric Ward | Guest | | | Recurring |
| Taylor Handley | Oliver Trask | Recurring | | | |
| Amanda Righetti | Hailey Nichol | Recurring | Guest | | |
| Linda Lavin | Sophie Cohen | Guest | Guest | | |
| Michael Nouri | Dr. Neil Roberts | Guest | Guest | Recurring | Recurring |
| Nicholas Gonzalez | D.J. | | Recurring | | |
| Michael Cassidy | Zach Stevens | | Recurring | | |
| Olivia Wilde | Alex Kelly | | Recurring | | |
| Shannon Lucio | Lindsay Gardner | | Recurring | | |
| Kathleen York | Renee Wheeler | | Recurring | | |
| Kim Delaney | Rebecca Bloom | | Recurring | | |
| Billy Campbell | Carter Buckley | | Recurring | | |
| Johnny Messner | Lance Baldwin | | Recurring | | |
| Marguerite Moreau | Reed Carlson | | Recurring | | |
| Nikki Griffin | Jess Sathers | | Recurring | Guest | |
| Jeri Ryan | Charlotte Morgan | | | Recurring | |
| Eric Mabius | Jack Hess | | | Recurring | |
| Ryan Donowho | Johnny Harper | | | Recurring | |
| Johnny Lewis | Dennis Childress | | | Recurring | |
| Kayla Ewell | Casey | | | Recurring | |
| Erin Foster | Heather | | | Recurring | Guest |
| Jeff Hephner | Matt Ramsey | | | Recurring | |
| Paula Trickey | Veronica Townsend | | | Recurring | Recurring |
| Cam Gigandet | Kevin Volchok | | | Recurring | Guest |
| Nikki Reed | Sadie Campbell | | | Recurring | |
| Shaun Duke | Henry Griffin | | | Recurring | |
| Chris Pratt | Che Cook | | | | Recurring |
| Gary Grubbs | Gordon Bullit | | | | Recurring |
| Brandon Quinn | Spencer Bullit | | | | Recurring |
| Kevin Sorbo | Frank Atwood | | | | Recurring |

Jackson Rathbone Justin

Cast notes

== Main characters ==
Cohen-Nichol family tree

Sophie Cohen | Rose Nichol | Caleb Nichol | Julie Cooper | Jimmy Cooper
Renee Wheeler | Frank Atwood | Dawn Atwood
Gloria Roberts | Neil Roberts | Sandy Cohen | Kirsten Cohen | Hailey Nichol | Lindsay Gardner | Marissa Cooper | Kaitlin Cooper | Julie & Frank's son
Summer Roberts | Seth Cohen | Sophie Rose Cohen | Ryan Atwood | Trey Atwood

=== Sandy Cohen ===
Portrayed by Peter Gallagher, an idealistic public defender who takes in Ryan Atwood in the pilot episode, much to the dismay of his wife, Kirsten. He is the husband of Kirsten, the father of Seth Cohen, and the legal guardian of Ryan Atwood. Although he lives in a large upper-class house, his politics are left-leaning and open-minded, causing friction between himself and the community. Peter Gallagher described the character as a "leftie Jewish guy from the Bronx". Sandy deals with many conflicts throughout the series, such as trying to gain acceptance from his father-in-law while being financially supported by his wife, and raising two teenagers in a (sometimes) corrupt environment.

=== Kirsten Cohen ===
Portrayed by Kelly Rowan, she is married to Sandy Cohen, the mother of Seth, adoptive mother of Ryan, and former CFO of her father's (Caleb Nichol) real estate company, the Newport Group. Before she met Sandy she dated and grew up with Jimmy Cooper father of Marissa Cooper, with whom she remains friends. Kirsten was very suspicious of Sandy's decision to bring Ryan into her home in the pilot episode, but in the third episode, she and Seth take Ryan back home after he is beaten in the juvenile detention center. By the end of the episode, Ryan's biological mother, Dawn Atwood, asks Kirsten to adopt Ryan, figuring he is better off in Newport than returning to Chino. She has had trouble with alcohol, which was triggered by the failing deteriorating relationship between her and her father, and had an abortion early in her life, which belonged to Jimmy. Kirsten continues to open a dating service with Julie, and becomes a mother of three at the end of the fourth season. The character's politics and lifestyle are more conservative than her husband's. Kelly Rowan described the character as seemingly more "together" than herself during an interview.

=== Ryan Atwood ===
Portrayed by Ben McKenzie, a troubled teenager from Chino who is brought into the privileged community of Newport Beach, California after his mother, Dawn Atwood, throws him out of their family home. Ryan is subsequently taken in by his public defender, Sandy Cohen. He forms fast bonds with the entire Cohen family, especially Sandy's son Seth, as well as an extreme attachment to the girl next door, Marissa Cooper. Ryan slowly finds himself a place within his new materialistic society, and makes of the most of his situation by not only completing high school, but also continuing on to university. Casting director Patrick Rush found the role of Ryan Atwood particularly hard to cast and only invited Ben McKenzie to an audition after Fox had made them aware of the young actor after his unsuccessful audition for a UPN sitcom. Rush said, "When Benjamin [McKenzie] came in, he wasn't physically what Josh had envisioned, but he inhabited the character unlike anyone we had seen. I think that the character of Ryan is a kid that always seems a little lost and has a sense of mystery and danger; Benjamin has all those qualities." Chad Michael Murray was originally offered the role of Ryan Atwood but turned it down for the lead role of Lucas Scott on One Tree Hill.

=== Marissa Cooper ===
Portrayed by Mischa Barton, throughout the series Marissa is frequently battling with drugs and alcohol, including nearly killing herself on a trip in Mexico with her friends. Marissa's relationships with her parents, boyfriends, and classmates are often tumultuous. She is Summer's best friend and Ryan's on-and-off love interest. Marissa is portrayed as a "spoiled girl who adjusts to being poor". The casting director referred to Marissa as "a girl stuck in the trappings of her life who seemed older than her actual age." Mischa Barton left the series at the end of season three when her character was subsequently written off by being killed in a car accident. Commenting on her departure, Barton said, "My character has been through so, so much and there's really nothing more left for her to do."

=== Seth Cohen ===
Portrayed by Adam Brody, the awkward adolescent son of Sandy and Kirsten Cohen. He is known for his quick quips, comic book fascination, and pop-culture references. He is also the love interest of Summer Roberts, on whom he had a crush on since third grade. Seth has been called a "Jewish nerd into obscure emo bands", who "starts dating a gorgeous, popular virgin." The New York Times characterised Seth as "eccentric and literate, Seth professes actual wanderlust [...] The show's press materials maintain that he's an existential hero along the lines of Holden Caulfield." Adam Brody's portrayal of Seth was well received and is considered one of the overall highlights of the series.

=== Luke Ward ===
Portrayed by Chris Carmack, Marissa's first boyfriend and regular cast member for most of the first season. Luke is initially the main antagonist of the series, coining the series famous "Welcome to the O.C., bitch!" line during a fight with Ryan in the premiere episode. However, he later becomes the main "comic punching bag" for the other characters after he and Ryan are begrudgingly paired together for a school project. They bond over cars when Luke takes him to his father's dealership to see the latest sports car models but catch Luke's father Carson kissing another man. When his father comes out, the once popular Luke falls out of favor with his clique and finds himself on the bottom of the social ladder for the first time. Ryan, Seth and Marissa then take him in as one of their own.

After that, Luke becomes a member of the group, more friendly and carefree than he had been earlier, becoming known for his lovable goofiness and love of beer. Josh Schwartz characterised the later Luke as "strumming a guitar being a goofball".

=== Jimmy Cooper ===
Portrayed by Tate Donovan, Marissa and Kaitlin's father (and Julie's ex-husband). He gets in trouble for embezzlement and must face the consequences of his actions and its effect on his reputation and personal life. After his divorce from Julie, he pursues Hayley Nichol, Kirsten's younger sister, who eventually leaves him to further her fashion career in Japan. He was a regular cast member for Season 1 and the beginning of Season 2. Jimmy's character made a brief appearance on season 3, but was quickly left when Jimmy is forced to leave town, the morning of his wedding to Julie, due to money problems. One interviewer characterised Jimmy as a "lovable deadbeat dad". Josh Schwartz has referred to the character as a "cat" in the DVD commentaries. The character is portrayed as flighty and perpetually in financial debt, despite warm relationships with his daughters. The character was ranked eighth by Entertainment Weekly on a list of the worst dads in television history.

=== Julie Cooper-Nichol ===
Portrayed by Melinda Clarke, the mother of Kaitlin Cooper and Marissa Cooper. At the beginning of the show she is married to financial planner Jimmy Cooper. She is often characterised as being devious, selfish, and shallow. However, she reveals a more vulnerable and empathetic part of herself a number of times during the series. Melinda Clarke summarised her character as being "clearly just such a money-digging whore. To me, it's so funny now to see The Real Housewives of Orange County because you realise it exists and that's what Julie was. Julie was obviously the original housewife." Melinda went on to commend the character's "incredible arc," saying that Julie started as "this woman who was so superficial but, of course, she's not just one-dimensional, she's multi-dimensional. Starting in her pink Juicy sweat suit outfit and then by the end she's graduated from college and moving on with her life. She's a survivor."

=== Summer Roberts ===
Portrayed by Rachel Bilson, Summer is, throughout the first few episodes, portrayed as a shallow, materialistic gossip who is ditzy and can have an occasional bitchy nature. Spoiled by her divorced father, she considers him to be her best friend, and his opinion matters as much, if not more than her own. Summer was unusual in combining the qualities of a conventionally attractive and desirable character with a tough, outspoken, "take-charge" attitude. She is portrayed as highly sexualised and initially appears stupid; later she undergoes something of a transformation and becomes far more intelligent and concerned about environmental issues, a change possibly due to her relationship with the geeky Seth Cohen. Initially Summer was only intended as a small supporting character, only there as an object of fantasy for Seth and a friend for Marissa Cooper, while Ryan Atwood and Marissa were the lead couple. However, due to Bilson's performance, Summer became an increasingly important character.

=== Caleb Nichol ===
Portrayed by Alan Dale, Kirsten's businessman father and later Julie Cooper's husband. His character recurs throughout the first season, and he becomes a regular during the second season, but comes to a sudden stop when his character suffers from a fatal heart attack during the season 2 finale. The Chicago Tribune characterised Caleb as a "gruff, uncompromising Newport Beach, Calif., real-estate developer". When asked by the Tribune about the character, Dale said, "The thing that's lovely about this character is that there's so much to do with him. His relationships are so complicated, and once the marriage happened, everyone was related in the show. That means he's got all these people to relate to, and he relates so badly with everyone."

=== Taylor Townsend ===
Portrayed by Autumn Reeser, introduced in the third season as a neurotic perfectionist student. Her character's initial personality was referred to by many critics as similar to the character Tracy Flick from the film Election. Taylor begins the series as a recurring villain before eventually becoming the second female lead in the fourth season. Autumn Reeser's performance was critically acclaimed. She reflected back on the character during a 2010 interview, saying "I feel like there's a lot of girls out there who could really relate to her, who hadn't seen themselves on TV in that way. I loved that about her. I loved that she made no apologies for who she was even though she wasn't what all the magazines said was OK. She was like, "I'm still valid. And I'm awesome. And I know I'm odd, and that's OK."

=== Kaitlin Cooper ===
Portrayed by Willa Holland in seasons 3 and 4, the role of Kaitlin Cooper was originated by Shailene Woodley on a recurring basis during season 1. Kaitlin spends much of the series at boarding school before returning on a recurring basis in season 3 (now played by Holland) and finally becoming a regular character in season 4. The daughter of Jimmy Cooper and Julie Cooper-Nichol and sister to Marissa Cooper. Her personality is more similar to her mother's rather than her father's, and she is portrayed as a regular pot smoker and occasional dealer. Holland observed that "no one can control her" but that her arc in Season 4 finds the character maturing. When asked about any disappointment over the recast, Shailene Woodley responded that, "I was 11 and I was on as a guest, recurring character, or whatever. My character went to boarding school and when they decided to bring her back, they actually re-auditioned me to bring her back. But I didn't go through puberty until late [...] So, there was no weirdness when Willa Holland got it because she was so obviously right for the role... and I was so obviously not [laughs]." In the series, Willa Holland's character dates a character played by the popular music star Chris Brown in the fourth season of the show.

== Recurring characters ==
The following is a list of characters that were recurring guests on the series; they are listed in the order that they first appeared on the show. Many characters have had storylines that have spanned multiple seasons, while the others are restricted to arcs that occurred during a single season of the show.

Season 2 recurring stars (L-R): Gonzalez, Lucio, Cassidy and Wilde

=== Taryn Baker ===
Taryn Baker is one of the "Newpsies;" wealthy, bored women who live in Newport Beach and spend their days lunching, shopping, and gossiping. Many of her appearances centered on her sexually adventurous side. In the first-season episode ("The Countdown"), she attended a swingers' party, claiming that such events had "saved [her] marriage." Later, she helped spread the rumour that Luke Ward's father had been having an affair with his male business partner ("The Secret"), and that this was why he had turned her down when she propositioned him. In the fourth season, it was revealed that swinging eventually did not save her marriage, which ended in divorce. Since her divorce, she had been sleeping with as many young men as possible, and goes out clubbing most nights, inviting Julie Cooper to come with her on one occasion. ("The Metamorphosis"). She also appeared in flashback, in the fourth-season episode ("The Case of the Franks"), where it was revealed that she attended high school with Kirsten Cohen and Jimmy Cooper.

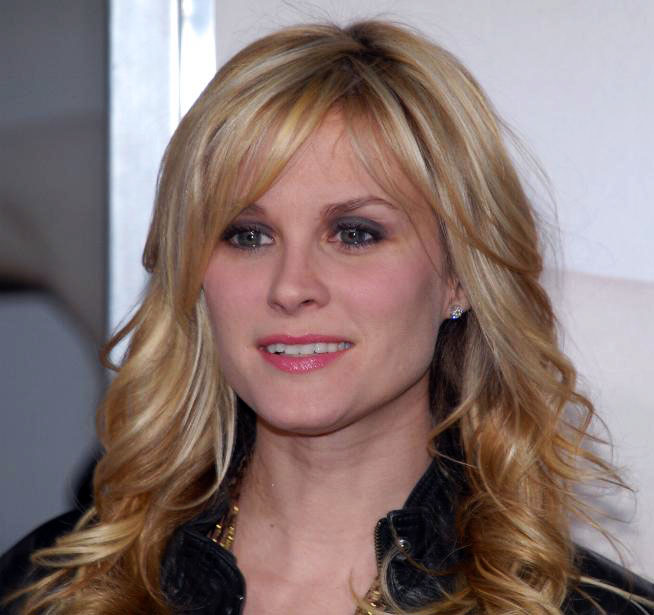
Bonnie Somerville who played Rachel

=== Rachel Hoffman ===
Rachel Hoffman is a former colleague of Sandy Cohen in the district attorney's office. She invites him to work with her in a private firm called Partridge, Savage and Kahn. Sandy takes the offer, and later Sandy's wife, Kirsten, finds Rachel and Sandy enjoying a drink, causing tension between Sandy and Kirsten. Rachel shares the case of Balboa Heights with Sandy, because the plaintiff is Caleb Nichol's company. While negotiating with Caleb, Caleb accuses Sandy and Rachel of having an affair. Some time afterwards, when Sandy and Rachel work until late in Rachel's apartment, Rachel flirts with Sandy but he rejects her advances. When the chemistry between the two fizzles out, Sandy and Kirsten attempt to set her up with Jimmy Cooper, but fail.

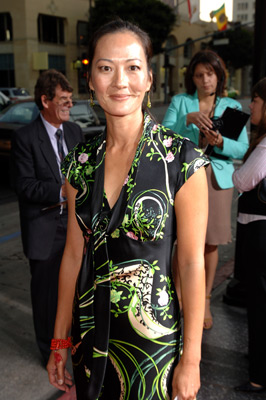
Rosalind Chao who played Dr. Kim

=== Dr. Kim ===
Dr. Kim is the Dean of the Harbor High School. She gives Ryan Atwood a chance to enter Harbor if he passes an admission exam, which he does, although he leaves halfway through the exam when Seth Cohen and Summer Roberts barge into the room and beg Ryan to come with them to help Marissa Cooper, who is recovering from her drug overdose in Tijuana. She persuades Marissa to continue her role as social chair despite Marissa's tarnished reputation after overdosing on painkillers. She later returns to have a meeting with Kirsten, Sandy and Ryan, after Ryan reads Oliver Trask's files in the file storage room. In 2005, she was confronted by Julie Cooper and Sandy, claiming that she does not have the power to decide to expel Marissa and Ryan, after the gunshot incident, deferring to the new Dean of Discipline, Jack Hess. However, she assists in re-admitting Marissa into Harbor by revealing a precedent in 1996, in which a similar incident to Trey's shooting had occurred with a formerly suspended student. At Harbor's 2006 graduation, Summer spontaneously leaps into Dr. Kim's arms.

Rosalind Chao, who portrayed Dr. Kim, was born in Orange County's largest city, Anaheim.

=== Carson Ward ===
Carson Ward, portrayed by Brian McNamara, is the husband of Meredith Ward, and the father of Eric, Brad, and Luke Ward. He graduated from the University of Southern California with a degree in history. He owns three auto dealerships. Carson and his family appeared happy, but in a sad twist, the family was not really "perfect". At one of his auto dealerships, Luke and Ryan discover Carson making out with another man and after realizing his son caught him, Carson decides to tell his wife who then files for divorce shortly after. Luke later admits to Ryan that his father "traveled" a lot and that he felt somewhat resentful of Carson for it when it turns out that the "traveling" was a cover for his affair. Months later, by season 2, Carson and Meredith's divorce has been finalized and Carson moves to Portland with Luke moving with him, but Brad and Eric staying behind in Newport with their mother. Carson later returns in the season 2 episode "The Distance", where Seth was staying at Luke and Carson's house in Portland.

=== Brad and Eric Ward ===
Brad and Eric Ward are Luke Ward's younger twin brothers. When they first appeared in season 1, they were around 12. After their parents divorced, Luke decides to live with their father and the twins are not seen; they presumably stayed behind in Newport with their mother, Meredith. They returned in season 4 and are classmates and friends with Kaitlin Cooper. Eric resembles Luke more than Brad and both are often seen flirting with female classmates. They also have a crush on Kirsten Cohen.

=== Cindy ===
Cindy, played by Holly Fields, is the younger sister of Julie and is also the aunt of Marissa and Kaitlin Cooper.

=== D.J. ===
D.J. played by Nicholas Gonzalez is described by creator Josh Schwartz as "the yard guy who works at Caleb's mansion". Later, however, it is revealed that Marissa Cooper has struck up a relationship with him after Ryan Atwood left Orange County. Marissa and DJ kept their trysts secret to prevent Marissa's mother Julie from finding out and firing D.J. When Ryan returns to Newport and asks Marissa if she was seeing anyone, Marissa lies to him and says she's single. However, Ryan discovers the truth when he finds Marissa and D.J. kissing. D.J. is angry with Marissa when he finds out about her lie, saying he felt like a back-up she only came to when Ryan was not around. Marissa apologizes and the two reconcile shortly afterward, with Marissa revealing their relationship to her mother by announcing that as he was her boyfriend, D.J. should appear with them in family portrait photographs to be taken with Caleb Nichol. As expected, this enrages Julie, who felt D.J. was socially beneath her daughter. Arranging a secret meeting with him, Julie gives D.J. a check for $5,000 to leave Marissa. D.J. does so, but first gives the check to Marissa, suggesting she go on a spending spree. He then leaves her, saying he had no regrets about their relationship, but he feels Marissa was with him only to spite her mother.

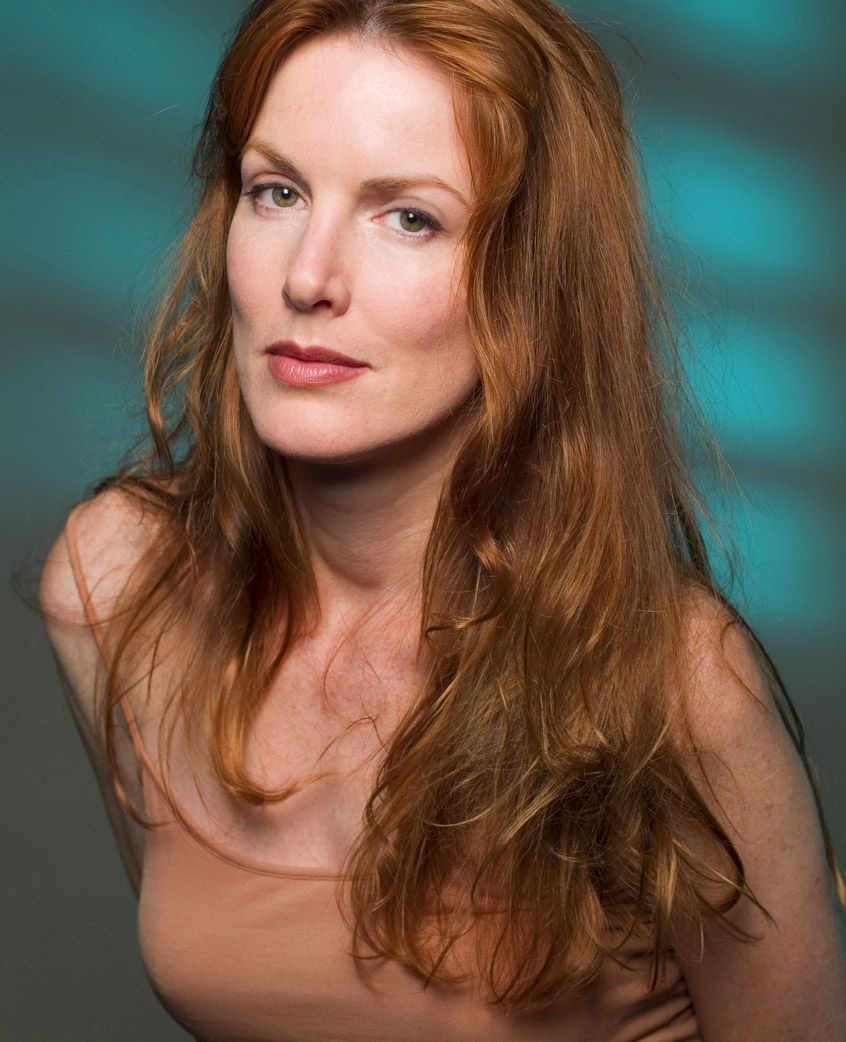
Kathleen York who played Renee Wheeler

=== Renee Wheeler ===
Renee Wheeler once had an affair with Caleb Nichol which led to her having a child, Lindsay Gardner. Caleb continues to pay her money and the DA misunderstand that, thinking that Caleb is bribing Renee for a building permit, for which Caleb is arrested ("The New Era"). Sandy figures out that the reason Caleb pays Renee is that she is the mother of his illegitimate child ("The SnO.C."). Caleb admits to having had an affair so he will be released from prison but the news angers his daughter, Kirsten Cohen ("The Chrismukkah That Almost Wasn't"). Renee later returns, asking Ryan Atwood to help her stop Caleb from adopting Lindsay as Caleb wants a paternity test and Renee isn't sure if Caleb really is Lindsay's father ("The Test"). The test results confirm Caleb's paternity but Lindsay ultimately decides that she doesn't want Caleb to adopt her because of how he treats her and she and her mother leave Newport for Chicago ("The Rainy Day Women").

=== Rebecca Bloom ===
Rebecca Bloom is an ex-girlfriend of Sandy Cohen played by Kim Delaney, who is described as Sandy's "love of [his] life" by Kirsten Cohen. Twenty years ago, she was accused of burning down a lab and killing a man in the fire. Rebecca denies that and claims that she fled the site because she did not want to testify against her friends. Her father, Max, asks his former student Sandy to find Rebecca, as he is dying and wants to see his only daughter one last time before dying. Rebecca shows up, and Max asks Sandy to clear her name; soon after this, he dies. Sandy continues to assist Rebecca, thus placing his marriage in jeopardy. Sandy and Rebecca finally realize that their love was a thing of the past, and Rebecca flees yet again.

=== Carter Buckley ===
Carter Buckley is introduced as a new editor of Newport Living. He has edited several magazines before, The Ugly American and GQ being two of them, and self-published Revolution. Carter is in a middle of divorce and becomes lugubrious. Kirsten Cohen puts an issue of Revolution into his mailbox in order to encourage him to restart his life. Carter accepts the job and spends a lot of time working with Kirsten who develops a crush on him. Carter's alcoholism helps develop Kirsten's, as they drink much during work. Carter leaves Orange County when offered a job in New York City. At the farewell dinner at the Cohens' house where Kirsten and Carter are alone, they share a kiss. Kirsten is apparently upset about his departure, and her drinking increases.

=== Lance Baldwin ===
Lance Baldwin is Julie Cooper's ex-boyfriend. Back in the 1980s, when she was in desperate need of money, she starred in a porn flick he directed, entitled "The Porn Identity". Although the film was never published, a desperate Lance suddenly shows up, and threatens Julie to pay $500,000 or else he would leak the film onto the internet. Julie asks her husband, Caleb Nichol, for help, but instead of paying Lance, Caleb sends two thugs to attack Lance. Furious, he sabotages the launch of Julie's new magazine, "Newport Living", by replacing the promotional video with archive footage from "The Porn Identity." A devastated Julie flees Orange County with Caleb Nichol and later returns after the controversy dies down. After Lance redeems himself, he and Julie reminisce over their past together, and share a kiss which is caught on camera. Caleb subsequently asks Julie for a divorce (and fires her from the newport group), and reveals to his wife that he has had people spy on her since before their marriage.

=== Jess Sathers ===
Jess Sathers was a student at Harbor who overdoses at Trey Atwood's 21st birthday party. She survives and begins a relationship with Trey that leads him to start using drugs. She then attempts to seduce Trey's brother, Ryan Atwood, in view of Marissa Cooper at Harbor, but Ryan rejects her advances. After botching an attempted drug deal which results in shootout at The Bait Shop, Jess decides to leave town with Trey but remains when he is shot by Marissa. In the third season, Jess asks Ryan to help her with boyfriend troubles, disrupting Ryan's attempts to start a relationship with Sadie.

=== Charlotte Morgan ===
Charlotte Morgan is a con artist, posing as a recovering alcoholic. She met Kirsten in rehab and tried to get money from her. However, this failed and she moved on to Julie. The two planned to throw a fund-raiser, a ploy by Charlotte to steal all the donations, but she gets found out when Julie goes into her handbag at a restaurant and finds numerous credit cards in different names. Charlotte gets Julie in on the scam; however, Julie does the right thing and asks people to write checks to the charity so Charlotte could not steal the money. With her plan foiled, she departed from Newport.

In July 2005 it was reported that Jeri Ryan was joining The O.C. in a seven-episode arc as "a mysterious woman Kirsten Cohen (Kelly Rowan) befriends in rehab". Later on Josh Schwartz said that "We were told to add this Jeri Ryan character to the show that we had no idea what to do with. We were just told we had to add an adult female character. It went nowhere, and we had no plan for it, and it just didn't fit the show." Rob Lineberger of DVD Verdict "thought Jeri Ryan made a compelling bad girl". Derek Hanson said that Ryan's addition was meant to get the "14–24 demographic excited", but stated that Charlotte Morgan had "a terrible storyline, that just didn't sit quite right."

=== Reed Carlson ===
Reed Carlson is the Vice President of the graphic novel company Bad Science. She was an assistant of Carter Buckley and he arranges a meeting after getting to know Seth Cohen and Zach Stevens, who co-created Atomic County. She likes the comic so she helps them to publish. Seth deliberately misleads Summer Roberts that Reed is a man, infuriating Summer. Later, Reed asks Seth to bring Summer, the real Little Miss Vixen, to a party. Summer does not like the place and asks Seth to leave, but Reed stops Seth from leaving, making Summer even angrier. Reed then threatens to sue Zach when he wants to pull out. Reed offers Summer a chance to be the star of the comic to ensure that Summer will stop convincing Seth and Zach of giving up on it. Summer shows up at the launch party wearing costume, but the party ends with Seth and Zach literally fighting for Summer. Reed is outraged about the debacle so she just let one person to meet George Lucas, who is interested in Atomic County.

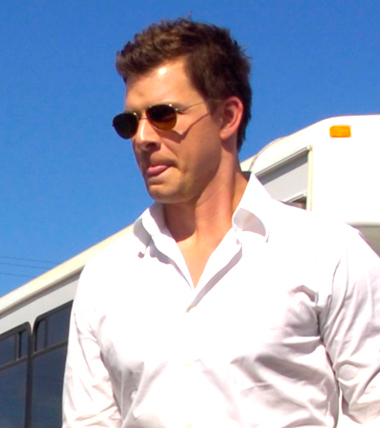
Eric Mabius who played Dean Hess

=== Jack Hess ===
Jack Hess who has a master's degree in education and who taught six years at boarding schools, is the new dean of discipline at Harbor High and is responsible for the measures to be taken after the gunshot incident. He wishes to punish Marissa Cooper but is only able to expel her. When Ryan Atwood punches him in the face, Jack uses that to have expelled Ryan as well. He then gives Seth Cohen two months' detention when he and Summer Roberts steal a tiki hut, which was a prop in a school play, so Ryan and Marissa can have sex in the hut on the beach. He is also responsible for Summer losing the social chair to Taylor Townsend by tricking her to admit that she helped Seth steal the tiki hut. At the Summer Dance, Summer sees Taylor and Jack sharing an intimate tryst and Sandy uses the information to blackmail Jack into leaving Harbor to save his career and get Ryan back into Harbor.

The Dean of Discipline position is filled by Dean Torres (Tia Carrere) in season 4 ("The Gringos").

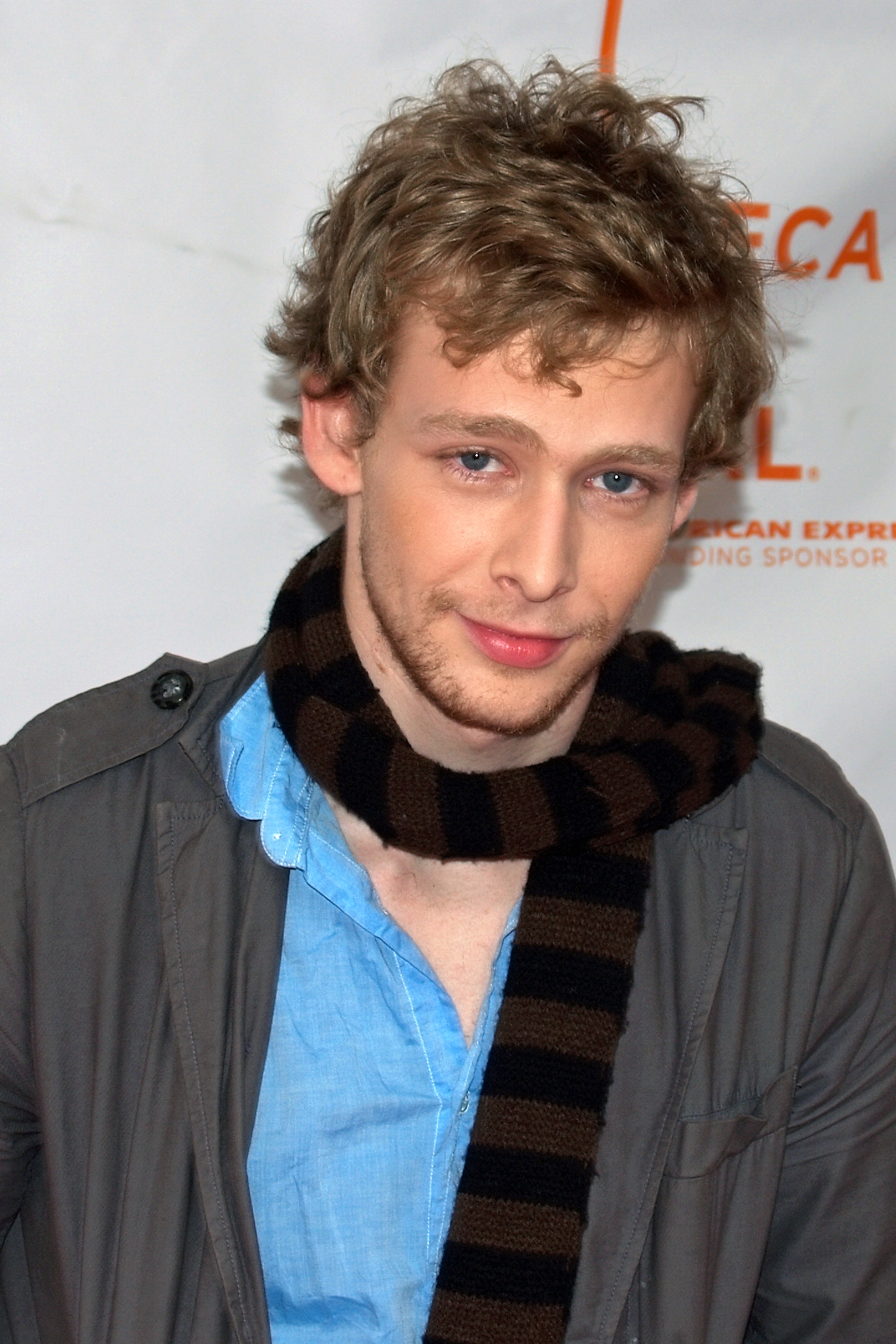
Johnny Lewis who played Chili

=== Dennis Childress ===
Dennis "Chili" Childress is Johnny Harper's best friend and one of the kids Marissa Cooper befriends at Newport Union. He introduces himself to Marissa as "Chili" and his similarities to Seth Cohen, earned him the short-lived nickname "Bizarro Seth" from Ryan Atwood. Chili is a good friend and aids Johnny, especially when he has to deal with Casey cheating on him and when he is injured by a car accident. Chili lies to Marissa about Johnny, telling her that he got back on the surfing team and will be leaving Newport Union to travel with them, as he and Johnny know that Johnny is the only reason Marissa is staying at Newport Union. Chili wants Johnny to confess to Marissa how he feels about her but when he does, Marissa tells him that she doesn't love him. After Johnny's death, Chili stops going by the name Chili and wants to be called Dennis instead, as Johnny never liked the nickname.

=== Heather ===
Heather attends Newport Union and disliked Marissa Cooper from the very beginning, harassing her and doing all she can to make Marissa's life as difficult as possible. She is extremely jealous of Marissa, assuming she still lives an exorbitant lifestyle despite Marissa and Julie having received nothing from Caleb's will. She helps Kevin Volchok kidnap Marissa in order to get Ryan Atwood to fight Volchok. She reappears at a party at Volchok's place, where she is given a spiked drink by Volchok's friends and is nearly raped by them before Marissa rescues her.

In the third-season finale, Heather helps Volchok to leave Newport in a stolen car. She is in the car when Volchok drives into Ryan's car, leading Ryan to drive off a cliff, which results in Marissa's death. In "The Cold Turkey" in season 4, she appears briefly and apologizes to Ryan about the night of Marissa's death, but claims to have had no control over Volchok's actions.

=== Casey ===
Casey attends Newport Union and dates Johnny Harper. She befriends Marissa Cooper when she enrolls at Union. She helps Marissa dodge the insults of Heather, the school bully, but when she notices that Johnny and Marissa are growing closer and closer, she feels jealous and suspicious, finally cheating on Johnny by making out with his rival Kevin Volchok. Johnny walks in on them and breaks up with her. She later explains to Marissa that she's not a bad person, and she could just see Johnny was falling in love with Marissa.

=== Matt Ramsey ===
Matt Ramsey is a 26-year-old associate of the company that will take over the Newport Group. He convinced Sandy Cohen to keep the company so that they can run it as co-partners and is then named vice president and director of development. In the episode "The Disconnect", he takes Ryan Atwood as an intern due to Ryan's knowledge and experience in construction. Matt takes Ryan to a strip club and is fired by Sandy, but gets another chance when one of the dancers comes to Sandy and explains why he goes there. He doesn't have any trouble bribing to get green light for projects which are against Sandy's principles. Sandy tries to "do it his way" but has to give in to Matt's way as the latter has most of the board members on his side. Matt has a brief relationship with Maya, daughter of the head of the hospital's board, Henry Griffin, but breaks up with her when Sandy proposes a deal with Henry. Henry asks Sandy to fire Matt because of his relationship to his daughter. Matt warns Sandy about Henry who takes kickbacks from vendors and tries to sell the story to newspapers but stops doing so after being beaten up by goons Henry has hired. Matt asks Henry for compensation as he has evidence that incriminates Henry. The deal is stopped by Sandy who pays Matt for the evidence. Matt then leaves for Chicago.

=== Sadie Campbell ===
Sadie Campbell is Johnny Harper's cousin and comes to Orange County to help Johnny's mother Gwen after her son dies ("The Heavy Lifting"). Ryan Atwood befriends Sadie, helping her to decorate the house and get money from Johnny's father ("The Road Warrior"). After some trouble, Sadie and Ryan start dating as Marissa Cooper and Ryan have broken up once again after Johnny's death ("The Undertow"). The relationship is doomed however, as Ryan is soon afterwards accepted to Berkeley and Sadie doesn't want to be the reason Ryan doesn't live his college life as he should and breaks up. She then leaves Newport to restart her jewellery-making business ("The Day After Tomorrow").

It was reported that Nikki Reed would make her television debut in a four-episode arc, which later became six. Reed stated that Sadie became "far from what I was originally pitched", suggesting that "glamming up the bohemian character" was to give the fans "someone who can give Mischa a run for her money." It was also rumoured by Reed herself that Sadie would return for the fourth season.

=== Henry Griffin ===
Henry Griffin is the Head of the Hospital Board. His daughter, Maya, dated Matt Ramsey briefly before breaking up, as Matt agrees Sandy Cohen's request to get Maya's help in giving a proposal to Henry. Henry asks Sandy to fire Matt for Maya which he does. Matt accuses Henry of taking kickbacks from ventures, and tries to sell the story to newspapers. In return, Henry orders three ruffians to vandalise Matt's apartment and beat him. After knowing what Henry did, Sandy threatens Henry to resign so he will "take [him] down". To stop Sandy, Henry bribes Sandy with a recommendation of a revitalising project. Later Matt asks Henry to pay him in exchange of evidence, and Henry brings a goon when they are ready to "make" the deal, but Sandy stops it. Sandy takes the evidence and pays Matt instead. Henry later is investigated by D.A. and banned from the board. Sandy finally gives up the hospital and supports D.A to charge Henry, by giving the documents D.A. needs.

=== Unnamed Harbor School bully ===
Portrayed by Tyson Chambers, the unnamed student is very cruel to Seth and Taylor in season 3.

=== Che Cook ===
Winchester "Che" Cook (Chris Pratt), is a friend of Summer Roberts who attends Brown University with her. He was the driving force behind Summer's left wing activism. When he and Summer break into a science lab and are interviewed by the Brown board, he blames all his illegal activities on Summer. As a result of Che's actions, Summer was suspended from Brown. Che later feels guilty and regretful for his actions and travels to Newport to ask her forgiveness. Later it's discovered he is actually extremely rich – his father owns a pharmaceutical company. In "The Chrismukk-huh?", he appears in an alternate universe when Ryan Atwood and Taylor Townsend are in a coma. In this universe, he took what would have been Ryan's spot for admission at Harbor High School, and was engaged to Summer Roberts, and having an affair with Julie Cooper and any woman he could get his hands on. In this universe, he wasn't an activist, as he is in real life. Later, in an attempt to repay Summer for her forgiveness for his misdeeds, Che tries to help Seth feel harmony with himself and takes him to the woods to connect with his spirit animal. During this trip, Che is convinced by a dream that Seth is his soul mate. Che attempts to test this idea in "The Groundhog Day" with mixed results eventually winding up with the pair in prison. His last name, Cook, is revealed as the officer announces his release. However, Che realises that Seth was not his soul mate, it was actually the environmentalist girl who is placed in the cell next to them. Together, Che and his soul mate leave Newport.

=== Gordon Bullit ===
Gordon Bullit, who refers to himself as "The Bullit", is a colorful oil merchant from Texas. Although he has been involved in bad deals, he is extremely wealthy. In prison, he met Frank Atwood, who he later hired to be in charge of his finances. He soon after developed a crush on Julie Cooper, and after some intimate e-mails he thought he was sharing with Julie (which was later revealed to be from Kaitlin Cooper pretending to be her mother) he proposed to Julie. She rejects him, as she is already in a relationship with Frank Atwood. She initially breaks up with Frank and dates Bullit when Kaitlin reveals how much she would like Bullit to be her stepfather, but realizes that Frank is the one she wants to be with and reunites with him on Valentine's Day. In the series finale, set six months after the earthquake, Julie is engaged to Bullit after Frank panicked and left her when he discovered she was pregnant. Ultimately, when she has to choose between Frank and Bullit Julie decides to stay single. Despite Julie's decision to not marry Bullit after all, he and the family remain good friends.

Bullit has 12 sons, whom he jokingly introduced to Kaitlin Cooper as "A Buffet of Bullits", all of which are named after cities in Texas where he has oil refinery—Austin, Dallas, Houston, Lubbock, Odessa, El Paso, Amarillo, Texarkana, San Antonio and Corpus Christi—with the exception of Hanoi (named after Vietnam's capital), where he also has a refinery, and Spencer. Hanoi is Asian and presumably adopted. Amarillo is a "doctor for women's private parts" (i.e. gynecologist).

=== Spencer Bullit ===
Spencer Bullit is Kaitlin Cooper's tennis instructor and Gordon Bullit's son. Kaitlin develops a crush on Spencer, who refuses to get involved with her as she is jailbait. Instead, he has a brief affair with Julie Cooper, which ends when Kaitlin tricks him into interrupting Julie on a date with his father. Later, he joins Julie's and Kirsten Cohen's agency, New Match, and uses their match-making to work as a gigolo. He has 11 brothers, most named after Texan cities.

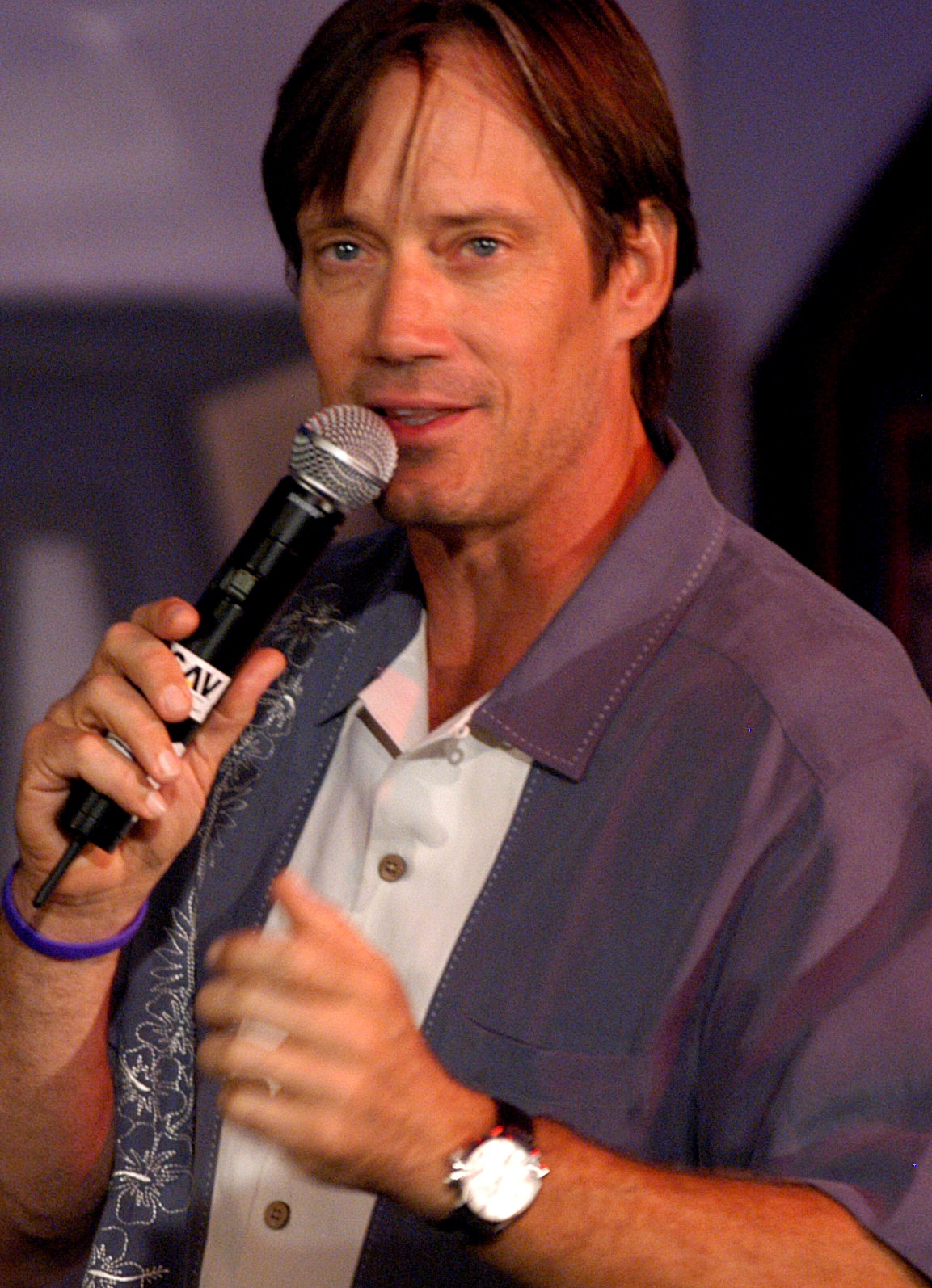
Kevin Sorbo who played Frank Atwood

=== Frank Atwood ===
Francis "Frank" Atwood initially appears as a business associate of Gordon Bullit, calling himself Frank Perry. He starts working at Kirsten's and Julie's matchmaking agency NewMatch. Frank had met Bullit in jail and Bullit offered him a position in his business. Later, Frank reveals to Julie that he had an ulterior motive for choosing Newport and that he was Ryan's biological father. Meanwhile, Sandy discovers that Frank was in prison for armed robbery. He wants to reunite with Ryan, but Ryan tells Sandy to pass on the message that he does not want to see him. According to Kirsten, Frank was an abusive alcoholic, as shown by Ryan visibly tensing up when hearing about Frank wanting to reunite with him. Frank tells Kirsten that he was dying of cancer and Kirsten invites him over to their home for dinner. However, Sandy, whose experience as a public defender led him to be suspicious of Frank's story, finds out from a physician friend in the prison system that Frank was lying and punches him, sparking a fight, which Ryan quickly breaks up. Ryan asks Frank to leave, saying that he was not ready to accept him into his life. In subsequent episodes, Ryan and Frank make amends and appear to be on speaking terms but Ryan has made it clear that even though he addresses Frank as "dad", he considers Sandy to be his father figure. Despite his past Frank is generally portrayed as a protagonist who is trying to get his life together.

Later in Season 4, Frank begins a relationship with Julie Cooper which is broken off when she decides to date Bullit for her daughter's sake because she and Gordon develop a close relationship. She later decides that Frank is the one she wants to be with and they begin dating again. Their son whose name is unknown was born a few months after Kirsten and Sandy's daughter.

In season 1, it was revealed that Frank (he was still unnamed and known simply as "Ryan's father" at that time), Dawn and their sons : Trey and Ryan lived in Fresno, California, where Frank worked as a mechanic. Like his ex-wife, he had alcohol problems and was arrested multiple times for alcohol-related offenses (DUI and public intoxication). After he was imprisoned for armed robbery, Dawn and the boys moved south to Chino, California, where the series begins. Ryan rarely mentioned him during the first three seasons, except through vague remarks.

== Special cameo appearances ==
- Robert Schwartzman ("The Third Wheel")
- Rooney ("The Third Wheel")
- Paris Hilton ("The L.A.")
- Jem Griffiths ("The Ties That Bind")
- Modest Mouse ("The Family Ties")
- The Thrills ("The Ex-Factor")
- Rachael Yamagata ("The Second Chance")
- Death Cab for Cutie ("The O.C. Confidential")
- T.I. ("The Return of the Nana")
- George Lucas ("The O.Sea")
- The Subways ("The Anger Management")
- Gisele Bündchen ("The Heavy Lifting")
- Steve-O ("The Gringos")
- Lisa Tucker ("The Party Favor")
- Chris Brown ("The My Two Dads", "The French Connection", "The Dream Lover")
