= Taylor Townsend (The O.C.) =

Fictional character from The O.C.

- The O.C. character
- Autumn Reeser as Taylor Townsend
- First appearance: "The Shape of Things to Come" (episode 3.02)
- Last appearance: "The End's Not Near, It's Here" (episode 4.16)
- Created by: J.J. Philbin
- Portrayed by: Autumn Reeser; Bella Thorne (flashbacks)

In-universe information
- Nicknames: Tator Tot, Peaches
- Gender: Female
- Title: Madame Taylor de Maumaront (2006–2007)
- Occupation: High school student (at the Harbor School; graduated); College student (at the Sorbonne; departed) (Note: Taylor's occupation at the time of the series flash forward is unknown.)
- Family: Unnamed father (father; estranged); Veronica Townsend (mother)
- Spouses: Henri Michel de Maumaront (ex-husband)
- Significant others: Ryan Atwood (left unclear); Jack Hess (affair); Seung Ho (ex-boyfriend)
- Relatives: Veronica Townsend (mother)
- Residence: Newport Beach, California; Formerly: Paris, France

Taylor Townsend is a fictional character on the FOX television series The O.C., played by Autumn Reeser.

In light of her more prominent castmate Mischa Barton's departure, Reeser was promoted to main cast.

== Characterization ==
=== Background ===
Taylor is the daughter of Veronica Townsend, a successful sports agent and chair of the parents' committee at The Harbor School. Her unnamed father left them when she was young. The only mention of her father is in episode 3.02 when Summer mentions raffling off a gas guzzling SUV from Taylor's father's dealership, and in an episode in season 4 in which she is trying to convince Ryan to see his father by telling him that her father "lives in San Diego with his new family, and is in Newport once a quarter to check on his car dealership", and tell him that she hasn't spent more than 20 minutes with him since second grade.

Taylor is highly intelligent, quick-witted and over-achieving. She is thought to be multi-lingual, speaking French, Spanish and Korean in several episodes, and narrating a majority of her valedictorian speech in Latin.

=== Personality ===
Taylor does not get much attention from her mother and Reeser described her character's "desperate ambition" as a result of troubles in her home life. Described as the "preppy, double-crossing nemesis of Summer Roberts" who is said to be able "to handle a chainsaw", Taylor Townsend was introduced into the show in the third season as a neurotic and annoying "goody goody" who stalks Seth and attempts to sabotage his relationship with Summer.

Despite being an overachiever, Taylor is also desperately needy and starved of affection and is prone to becoming besotted and obsessed with any man who offers her help or affection. This is largely the result of the lack of a father figure for much of her life and her being emotionally neglected by her perfectionist mother. In season 4, she is often seen in Summer's room or at the Cohens' house to escape her mother's constant put-downs. She was initially portrayed as a manipulative and conniving antagonist of the main characters, particularly Summer.

== Character arc ==
=== Season 3 ===
Taylor first appears in the third season, as Marissa Cooper is expelled from Harbor High School and thus barred from keeping her position as student social chair. Taylor's gain is part of the fallout from Marissa having shot Trey Atwood in order to defend his brother and her boyfriend, Ryan.

Taylor's power-grabbing encourages an otherwise reluctant Summer to seek the social chair position. Summer's biggest test as social chair comes in organizing the annual school carnival, as she successfully coordinates the mix of rides, food, and events. However, when Summer plans a Fall dance for the school, she is overshadowed by Taylor, who takes credit for it, and the new Dean of Discipline at Harbor.

Initially, only Summer seems aware of Taylor's scheming, while Marissa seems only mildly interested in the goings-on in Taylor's life, and Summer's boyfriend Seth Cohen seems to not believe Summer's story at all. At this particular dance, Summer follows Taylor and catches her kissing Dean Hess in his office. Though she tries to convince Seth of what she's seen, no one will believe her.

In "The Perfect Storm", Summer manipulates Taylor to finally get proof of an affair between her and the Dean to present to Seth by telling the girl that Dean Hess and another faculty member at the school were making out under the bleachers.

Seth and Summer eventually convince Taylor to go to an area motel (the same motel where Luke Ward and Julie Cooper had an affair, as well as where Ryan met up with his onetime girlfriend Theresa Diaz one night) to meet with the "Dean," only to surprise her when they answer the door and begin throwing out accusations. Threatening to tell everyone of the affair, Summer forces Taylor to tell Seth's dad Sandy the truth. Later, Sandy confronts Dean Hess and tricks him into believing that he has pictures of the two of them kissing on his Sidekick. In return for keeping quiet, Sandy tells Hess to let Ryan (whom he kicked out) back into Harbor, and then resign.

Despite being something of a socialite, Taylor is highly looked down upon by her classmates. During "The Swells", classmates threw things at her after she organized a mandatory senior lock-in and attempted speaking to her classmates. Seth came to her rescue, unwittingly gaining Taylor's affection in the process. Taylor, wanting to keep him for herself, refuses to allow a late Summer to come to the lock-in by pretending that she could not hear her. It is also in this episode that we learn why Taylor may be so conniving and manipulative. Her own mother, a highly driven sports agent, is shown as emotionally cold toward her daughter.

Their relationship is again brought into focus in "The Safe Harbor". When Seth and Summer wanted to get Marissa back in Harbor, they went to Taylor as she could get more names for their petition to reinstate Marissa. Taylor at first wanted nothing to do with it, but she soon gave in and helped out. Threats from her mother to take away her car and college money momentarily deterred Taylor from protest efforts, but she emerged at a school board hearing on Marissa's side, defying her mother. It was a decision that earned Taylor new respect from her classmates, and from Summer specifically, leading to her becoming friends with, not only Summer and Seth, but also Marissa and Ryan.

Later in the year, Taylor develops a romance with a male Korean waiter, Seung-Ho. He takes her to the prom, and his cousin, a member of a Korean boyband, takes Summer.

=== Season 4 ===
In Season 4, Taylor secretly arrives back in Newport after attending the Sorbonne University and needs to seek legal advice as she is married to a Frenchman. Henri Michel de Maumaront, her husband, refuses to sign divorce papers, though. She begins hiding out at various locations to avoid running into her mother. Taylor then goes to Brown to visit Summer, and soon returns to Newport and stays with the Cohens. Kirsten Cohen tries to help Taylor through her situation by helping Taylor tell her mother. Taylor eventually does tell Veronica, and in a fury, she kicks Taylor out of her house. Thus, Taylor starts living with the Cohens. In The Metamorphosis, Taylor gets a letter from Henri Michel, again saying that he will not sign a divorce paper, and is asking Taylor to go to France to settle everything. His lawyer eventually shows up and says that the only way the two can get divorced is if one of the party is unfaithful to their marriage. Taylor then tells Henri-Michel's lawyer that she is having an affair with Ryan Atwood. Ryan does not find out about this until he translates the divorce papers he was asked to sign, as Taylor's lover. Ryan soon backs out on Taylor when he finds this out, but Sandy Cohen talks him into helping her.

When Ryan arrives at the meeting place where Taylor and Henri-Michel's lawyer are, he gives Taylor a kiss to "prove" they are together. Henri-Michel's lawyer sees this and agrees to return to France with the news of Taylor's infidelity. Soon, Taylor realizes that she has an infatuation with Ryan and brings to his house a peach torte she prepared herself.

Ryan soon has zzz problems. and when Taylor hears about it, she thinks it's her duty to cure him. So, she pretends to be his sleep therapist in an attempt to seduce him. She uncovers Ryan's unresolved feelings towards his late ex-girlfriend Marissa, and towards Marissa's other ex-boyfriend Kevin Volchok who killed her in a car accident. Once she realizes that she and Ryan weren't meant to be, she just decides to give him some tea, that actually helps him go to sleep. But when Ryan tells her he doesn't know how he feels about her, she tells him to kiss her to see if he feels anything. Once they kiss, she takes advantage a little bit, then stops herself mistaking his silence for indifference. After the kiss, Ryan fantasizes about Taylor washing windows, dancing on the kitchen counter and riding on roller skates, during each of these fantasies Ryan hears Taylor talking dirty to him. Ryan realizes that he likes Taylor and he asks her on the date. However, during the date, Ryan realizes that he isn't ready to begin a new emotional relationship. Taylor tries to make him jealous by paying a homosexual guy named Roger to pretend that he likes her, but he uncovers her move and tells her he's not sure about a relationship, something she says is a long way off, and that any current relations should be purely physical. Taylor and Ryan kiss in a closet and start making out while playing a game of seven minutes in heaven.

In The Chrismukk-huh?, though, Ryan is afraid Taylor thinks that they are both going out and is afraid to ask her to Christmas dinner. Taylor, bringing a present she wrapped herself, heavily hints that she would like to come to dinner. When Ryan coldly rejects her, Taylor works herself in to a fury and starts yelling at Ryan when he is on the roof hanging Christmas lights. In her angry state, she climbs up the ladder to yell at him, but they both end up falling and going into comas. In their comas, they entered an alternate universe and Taylor hears information that convinces her that Marissa is still alive. When she finds out that Marissa was supposedly alive, she immediately tells Ryan, who sets out to look for her. He later finds out that it was really Kaitlin Cooper, Marissa's younger sister, who was returning from university. Taylor, realizing that Ryan is not over Marissa, goes to a Christmas party in her coma dream and finds out that in her coma she is a boy, and sees her mom bullying him. Taylor then goes and stands up to her, defending herself and calls her mother a bitch. Doing this, she wakes up from her coma.

Veronica Townsend (after some persuasion from Julie) comes to the hospital to see Taylor but is more disappointed that she missed her flight to Mexico. Taylor tells her to get a last-minute flight, hugs her and wishes her a Merry Christmas. The encounter makes Taylor happy that she can finally cut her mother loose.

Back in the alternate universe, Ryan, still not sure what to do, tries to matchmake everyone with the right person but realizes that that's not the case—it was that he had to read a letter from Marissa and move on from her. At the beach, alone, he finally reads it and slips out of his coma. The two have no memory of what happened in the alternate universe, however they both realize that they are at rest with their internal demons, Taylor being her relationship with her mother and Ryan reaching closure in his relationship with Marissa. Ryan rekindles his relationship with Taylor.

Ryan and Taylor are now officially in a relationship. Ryan attempts to organize a special rendezvous for himself and Taylor in The Earth Girls Are Easy but is foiled when Seth decides he and Summer will "tag along" on the trip, due to Seth's failure to plan New Years festivities for Summer. Ryan mistakenly thinks that Taylor may have concealed a prior sexual encounter when Seth reveals that Taylor packed a pregnancy test for the trip. The test was actually for Summer who was "late" and whom Taylor suspected might be pregnant with Seth's child (it turned out to be a false alarm but Seth and Summer got engaged anyway). Taylor is angry with Ryan's assumption that she has been sleeping with other men and the pair argue. Only to later make up when Ryan realizes that the test was not her and her defensiveness was due to her fears of being seen as a "promiscuous divorcee". Taylor forgives Ryan for jumping to conclusions. Later that night, Taylor puts on the lingerie she gave Ryan as a gift, and this is the first time they really fool around.

Now that Taylor and Ryan are a couple, their relationship becomes more serious. When Ryan's dad comes back into the picture, Taylor realizes that their relationship is going to face their first challenge and Taylor meets Ryan's Father at a dinner and things between Ryan and Taylor are going well.

In "The French Connection" Ryan and Taylor experience a bump in their relationship when Taylor's French ex-husband, Henri-Michel, comes to Newport, and Ryan feels that Taylor has more in common with Henri-Michel than himself. Events come to a head when Ryan discovers Taylor lied about his job, telling her ex-husband that he was an academic. Upset and angry over Ryan not calling her for a week, Taylor rekindles her relationship with her ex-husband. However, when Ryan interrupts Henri-Michel's poetry reading with a love poem that he wrote for Taylor, she realises that Ryan is the one she wants to be with. In the end, despite Taylor and Ryan's affection for each other, Taylor calls things off until she can become a more independent person.

She seeks out help from a therapist, but realizes that her and Ryan are right for each other and they get back together. Ryan and Taylor kiss and they agree to sort out their relationship issues. Ryan and Taylor become a couple again.

On Valentine's Day, now that Ryan and Taylor are a couple again, Taylor wants to do something special with Ryan. They end up helping out Ryan's dad and then Ryan kisses Taylor and they drive to the beach for a romantic evening.

In The Shake Up Taylor tries to have Ryan to say that he loves her. To do this Taylor decides to try to get Ryan drunk to "losen his tongue". In the run-up to Taylor's nineteenth birthday party Ryan contemplates if he should tell Taylor that he loves her. He has been her boyfriend for many months and he wonders if he is ready to take that step. She attempts to get Ryan drunk but instead she becomes drunk herself. While the couple talks about their romance and the obstacles they face, Ryan finally says he loves her. However he holds back when he finds out that Taylor applied to Berkeley. The prospect of going to college together scares Ryan and instead of his original gift, he gives Taylor a dictionary. Taylor later explains that she had applied to Berkeley before they started dating and asks Ryan if he would have told her he loved her if he knew she applied to Berkeley. When Ryan does not say anything, Taylor immediately understands that he never would have said it. Distraught and upset, she leaves the party without blowing out her birthday candles.

Ryan, after some advice from Kaitlin, gives Taylor the original present he was going to give her, a book of French love poems that Taylor translated. Ryan tells Taylor that he loves her again. When Ryan tells her that he wants her to come to Berkeley with him, an earthquake strikes. He immediately takes Taylor under his arms and protects her using his body as a shield and receives a hit from Taylor's cabinet shelf.

The two survive the earthquake but Ryan hides the fact that he has been injured. Taylor is fine but she becomes very agitated and chatty. She quickly goes through her well-stocked emergency preparedness kit. Seth and Summer make it back to the house unharmed; Seth quickly covers for Ryan, who tries to conceal the fact that he bleeding from his back. After the two depart the house Taylor and Summer look for Pancakes.

Taylor accidentally fires a flare at her mother's foot who came to check on her. Summer, Taylor and Veronica make their way to the hospital. The two women are quite bitter towards each other but at the hospital Taylor tells her mother she loves her. Her mother replies that she loves her too and they share a hug. They both leave the hospital with Summer, the Cohens and the Coopers.

==== Series finale ====
Six months later, she and Ryan have broken up and Taylor has returned to Paris. Both of them refuse to see each other but end up meeting at the airport. It was made very obvious, to them as well as Seth and Summer, that they still had feelings for each other. She was devastated when Ryan told her that the Cohens are moving to Berkeley, meaning she won't be able to see him anymore. They get to talk at the Berkeley house before Julie's wedding. Initially they both agree to be friends but unable to resist they kiss passionately and end up making out on the bed together, interrupted by the house owner.

Ryan and Taylor spend time together as a couple. They sit on a train together, as she prepares to go to New York and then on a boat to France. They share a heartfelt conversation about their relationship and share another passionate kiss. The two thank each other for the happy memories they shared in the year. Ryan spends one last hour on the train with Taylor before getting off in San Bernardino.

In a flashforward vignette, Taylor and Ryan are seen together at Seth and Summer's wedding, with Ryan as the best man and Taylor as the maid of honor. They both exchange glances and smile at each other. Taylor appeared in 35 episodes total.

== Trivia ==
It was revealed in The Case of the Franks during a flashback set in 1998 when Taylor was 10 years old and attended class with Summer, Seth, Luke, Holly and Marissa (Not seen), Taylor wrote the poem "I Wish I was a Mermaid" and Summer stole it from her and for a very long time Seth had mistaken the poem for Summer's. Also in the flashback, Holly Fischer made fun of her by calling her Taylor Dorksend.

== Reception ==
Rob Lineberger of DVD Verdict described Taylor and the other new characters as "detestable additions to the Season Three cast" but then went on to say that she was "a more likeable version of Paris Geller from Gilmore Girls". Amazon.com described the "Tracy Flick-like Taylor" as "a welcome addition" to season three. Daniel Fienberg of Zap2it described Taylor as going "from recirculated Queen Bee cliche to unexpected quirky charm in a matter of episode[s]."

During the fourth season, Kristin Veitch of E! Online described Taylor Townsend as "the biggest reason we're all still watching the show". Michael Yarish of Yahoo! TV described Reeser's character as a "smart, French-speaking valedictorian [who] became a fan favorite with her sheer exuberance". Alan Sepinwall, a television critic for The Star-Ledger, described Taylor's pairing with Ryan as "inevitable" because she was the "only available, age-appropriate female regular".
