= List of The O.C. episodes =

The O.C. is an American teen drama television series created by Josh Schwartz. It premiered on Fox, an American television network, on August 5, 2003, with the pilot episode "Premiere". The O.C. is set in Newport Beach, Orange County, California and follows the stories of residents in the wealthy, harbor-front community. The series mainly focuses around the Cohen and Cooper families, and the Cohen's adoption of Ryan Atwood, a troubled teenager from Chino, California. The show ran until February 22, 2007, with ninety-two episodes split over four seasons. The first season consisted of twenty-seven episodes, the second season was twenty-four episodes long and preceded by two specials that gave a retrospective look at season one, and previewed the upcoming second season. Season three was twenty-five episodes long, but only sixteen episodes were ordered for the final fourth season as falling ratings led to the show's cancellation.

All four seasons are available on DVD in Regions 1, 2 and 4. Additionally, The O.C. The Complete Series was released on November 27, 2007, in Canada and the United States, which included the first season remastered in widescreen. The complete series was also released as a Region 2 DVD on November 19, 2007, but did not include the remastered version of the first season. For registered members of the US iTunes Store, all four seasons are available for purchase and download. These seasons are also available in the US as video on demand from Amazon Video. In October 2008 the first and second seasons were made available on the United Kingdom iTunes Store. In the United States, the fourth season was also made available in the Zune.

== Series overview ==
| Season | Episodes | Originally released | | U.S. viewers (in millions) |
| Season | Episodes | First released | Last released | U.S. viewers (in millions) |
|---|---|---|---|---|
| 1 | 27 | August 5, 2003 | May 5, 2004 | 9.48 |
| 2 | 24 | November 4, 2004 | May 19, 2005 | 7.44 |
| 3 | 25 | September 8, 2005 | May 18, 2006 | 5.83 |
| 4 | 16 | November 2, 2006 | February 22, 2007 | 3.96 |

== Episodes ==
=== Season 1 (2003–04) ===
| No. overall | No. in season | Title | Directed by | Written by | Original release date | Prod. code | U.S. viewers (millions) |
|---|---|---|---|---|---|---|---|
| 1 | 1 | "Premiere" | Doug Liman | Josh Schwartz | August 5, 2003 | 475197 | 7.46 |
| 2 | 2 | "The Model Home" | Doug Liman | Story by : Allan Heinberg & Josh Schwartz; Teleplay by : Josh Schwartz | August 12, 2003 | 176501 | 7.86 |
| 3 | 3 | "The Gamble" | Ian Toynton | Jane Espenson | August 19, 2003 | 176502 | 7.96 |
| 4 | 4 | "The Debut" | Daniel Attias | Allan Heinberg & Josh Schwartz | August 26, 2003 | 176503 | 8.65 |
| 5 | 5 | "The Outsider" | Jesús Salvador Treviño | Melissa Rosenberg | September 2, 2003 | 176504 | 9.13 |
| 6 | 6 | "The Girlfriend" | Steve Robman | Story by : Debra J. Fisher & Erica Messer; Teleplay by : Josh Schwartz | September 9, 2003 | 176505 | 9.09 |
| 7 | 7 | "The Escape" | Sanford Bookstaver | Josh Schwartz | September 16, 2003 | 176506 | 8.77 |
| 8 | 8 | "The Rescue" | Michael Lange | Story by : Allan Heinberg; Teleplay by : Melissa Rosenberg | October 29, 2003 | 176507 | 9.27 |
| 9 | 9 | "The Heights" | Patrick Norris | Debra J. Fisher & Erica Messer | November 5, 2003 | 176508 | 7.52 |
| 10 | 10 | "The Perfect Couple" | Michael Fresco | Allan Heinberg | November 12, 2003 | 176509 | 8.28 |
| 11 | 11 | "The Homecoming" | Keith Samples | Josh Schwartz & Brian Oh | November 19, 2003 | 176510 | 9.03 |
| 12 | 12 | "The Secret" | James Marshall | Allan Heinberg & Josh Schwartz | November 26, 2003 | 176511 | 7.02 |
| 13 | 13 | "The Best Chrismukkah Ever" | Sanford Bookstaver | Stephanie Savage | December 3, 2003 | 176512 | 9.27 |
| 14 | 14 | "The Countdown" | Michael Fresco | Josh Schwartz | December 17, 2003 | 176513 | 7.99 |
| 15 | 15 | "The Third Wheel" | Sandy Smolan | Melissa Rosenberg | January 7, 2004 | 176514 | 9.37 |
| 16 | 16 | "The Links" | Michael Lange | Debra J. Fisher & Erica Messer | January 14, 2004 | 176515 | 8.57 |
| 17 | 17 | "The Rivals" | Ian Toynton | Josh Schwartz | January 21, 2004 | 176516 | 12.72 |
| 18 | 18 | "The Truth" | Rodman Flender | Allan Heinberg | February 11, 2004 | 176517 | 12.70 |
| 19 | 19 | "The Heartbreak" | Lev L. Spiro | Josh Schwartz | February 18, 2004 | 176518 | 10.95 |
| 20 | 20 | "The Telenovela" | Sanford Bookstaver | Stephanie Savage | February 25, 2004 | 176519 | 9.56 |
| 21 | 21 | "The Goodbye Girl" | Patrick Norris | Josh Schwartz | March 3, 2004 | 176520 | 10.27 |
| 22 | 22 | "The L.A." | David M. Barrett | Josh Schwartz | March 24, 2004 | 176521 | 11.09 |
| 23 | 23 | "The Nana" | Michael Lange | Allan Heinberg | March 31, 2004 | 176522 | 11.37 |
| 24 | 24 | "The Proposal" | Helen Shaver | Liz Friedman & Josh Schwartz | April 14, 2004 | 176523 | 10.50 |
| 25 | 25 | "The Shower" | Sandy Smolan | J. J. Philbin | April 21, 2004 | 176524 | 10.13 |
| 26 | 26 | "The Strip" | James Marshall | Allan Heinberg | April 28, 2004 | 176525 | 10.52 |
| 27 | 27 | "The Ties That Bind" | Patrick Norris | Josh Schwartz | May 5, 2004 | 176526 | 10.72 |

=== Season 2 (2004–05) ===
| No. overall | No. in season | Title | Directed by | Written by | Original release date | Prod. code | U.S. viewers (millions) |
|---|---|---|---|---|---|---|---|
| 28 | 1 | "The Distance" | Ian Toynton | Josh Schwartz | November 4, 2004 | 2T5101 | 8.56 |
| 29 | 2 | "The Way We Were" | Michael Lange | Allan Heinberg | November 11, 2004 | 2T5102 | 8.08 |
| 30 | 3 | "The New Kids on the Block" | Lev L. Spiro | Stephanie Savage | November 18, 2004 | 2T5103 | 7.42 |
| 31 | 4 | "The New Era" | Michael Fresco | J. J. Philbin | December 2, 2004 | 2T5104 | 6.51 |
| 32 | 5 | "The SnO.C." | Ian Toynton | John Stephens | December 9, 2004 | 2T5105 | 6.36 |
| 33 | 6 | "The Chrismukkah That Almost Wasn't" | Tony Wharmby | Josh Schwartz | December 16, 2004 | 2T5106 | 6.27 |
| 34 | 7 | "The Family Ties" | Lesli Glatter | Drew Greenberg & Josh Schwartz | January 6, 2005 | 2T5107 | 7.65 |
| 35 | 8 | "The Power of Love" | Michael Lange | John Stephens | January 13, 2005 | 2T5108 | 7.46 |
| 36 | 9 | "The Ex-Factor" | Michael Fresco | J. J. Philbin | January 20, 2005 | 2T5109 | 7.87 |
| 37 | 10 | "The Accomplice" | Ian Toynton | Allan Heinberg | January 27, 2005 | 2T5110 | 8.11 |
| 38 | 11 | "The Second Chance" | Tony Wharmby | Drew Greenberg & Josh Schwartz | February 3, 2005 | 2T5111 | 7.25 |
| 39 | 12 | "The Lonely Hearts Club" | Ian Toynton | J. J. Philbin | February 10, 2005 | 2T5112 | 8.15 |
| 40 | 13 | "The Father Knows Best" | Michael Lange | John Stephens | February 17, 2005 | 2T5113 | 7.79 |
| 41 | 14 | "The Rainy Day Women" | Michael Fresco | Josh Schwartz | February 24, 2005 | 2T5114 | 7.23 |
| 42 | 15 | "The Mallpisode" | Ian Toynton | Stephanie Savage | March 10, 2005 | 2T5115 | 7.66 |
| 43 | 16 | "The Blaze of Glory" | Robert Duncan McNeill | Mike Kelley | March 17, 2005 | 2T5116 | 7.55 |
| 44 | 17 | "The Brothers Grim" | Michael Lange | J. J. Philbin | March 24, 2005 | 2T5117 | 8.59 |
| 45 | 18 | "The Risky Business" | Norman Buckley | Cory Martin | April 7, 2005 | 2T5118 | 6.79 |
| 46 | 19 | "The Rager" | Tony Wharmby | John Stephens | April 14, 2005 | 2T5119 | 6.39 |
| 47 | 20 | "The O.C. Confidential" | Tony Wharmby | Mike Kelley | April 21, 2005 | 2T5120 | 6.55 |
| 48 | 21 | "The Return of the Nana" | Ian Toynton | Josh Schwartz | April 28, 2005^{*} | 2T5121 | 6.77 |
| 49 | 22 | "The Showdown" | Michael Fresco | John Stephens | May 5, 2005^{*} | 2T5122 | 7.19 |
| 50 | 23 | "The O.Sea" | Michael Lange | J. J. Philbin | May 12, 2005 | 2T5123 | 6.12 |
| 51 | 24 | "The Dearly Beloved" | Ian Toynton | Josh Schwartz | May 19, 2005 | 2T5124 | 7.63 |

=== Season 3 (2005–06) ===
| No. overall | No. in season | Title | Directed by | Written by | Original release date | Prod. code | U.S. viewers (millions) |
|---|---|---|---|---|---|---|---|
| 52 | 1 | "The Aftermath" | Ian Toynton | Story by : Josh Schwartz & Bob DeLaurentis; Teleplay by : Josh Schwartz | September 8, 2005 | 2T6251 | 7.50 |
| 53 | 2 | "The Shape of Things to Come" | Tony Wharmby | J. J. Philbin | September 15, 2005 | 2T6252 | 6.22 |
| 54 | 3 | "The End of Innocence" | Michael Lange | Stephanie Savage | September 22, 2005 | 2T6253 | 6.45 |
| 55 | 4 | "The Last Waltz" | Ian Toynton | John Stephens | September 29, 2005 | 2T6254 | 6.56 |
| 56 | 5 | "The Perfect Storm" | Tony Wharmby | Mike Kelley | November 3, 2005 | 2T6255 | 6.65 |
| 57 | 6 | "The Swells" | Michael Fresco | J. J. Philbin | November 10, 2005 | 2T6256 | 5.76 |
| 58 | 7 | "The Anger Management" | Michael Fresco | John Stephens | November 17, 2005 | 2T6257 | 6.20 |
| 59 | 8 | "The Game Plan" | Tate Donovan | Cory Martin | December 1, 2005 | 2T6258 | 5.90 |
| 60 | 9 | "The Disconnect" | Tony Wharmby | Stephanie Savage | December 8, 2005 | 2T6259 | 5.88 |
| 61 | 10 | "The Chrismukkah Bar-Mitzvahkkah" | Ian Toynton | Josh Schwartz | December 15, 2005 | 2T6260 | 6.22 |
| 62 | 11 | "The Safe Harbor" | Tony Wharmby | Mike Kelley | January 12, 2006 | 2T6261 | 5.13 |
| 63 | 12 | "The Sister Act" | Ian Toynton | Leila Gerstein | January 19, 2006 | 2T6262 | 5.36 |
| 64 | 13 | "The Pot Stirrer" | Norman Buckley | John Stephens | January 26, 2006 | 2T6263 | 5.70 |
| 65 | 14 | "The Cliffhanger" | Michael Lange | J. J. Philbin | February 2, 2006 | 2T6264 | 5.35 |
| 66 | 15 | "The Heavy Lifting" | Ian Toynton | Stephanie Savage | February 9, 2006 | 2T6265 | 5.25 |
| 67 | 16 | "The Road Warrior" | Michael Fresco | Mike Kelley | March 9, 2006 | 2T6266 | 7.36 |
| 68 | 17 | "The Journey" | Roxann Dawson | John Stephens | March 16, 2006 | 2T6267 | 5.40 |
| 69 | 18 | "The Undertow" | Robert Duncan McNeill | Mark Fish & J. J. Philbin | March 23, 2006 | 2T6268 | 5.36 |
| 70 | 19 | "The Secrets and Lies" | Michael Fresco | Stephanie Savage & Josh Schwartz | March 30, 2006 | 2T6269 | 5.50 |
| 71 | 20 | "The Day After Tomorrow" | Norman Buckley | Leila Gerstein | April 6, 2006 | 2T6270 | 5.06 |
| 72 | 21 | "The Dawn Patrol" | Ian Toynton | Mike Kelley | April 13, 2006 | 2T6271 | 4.33 |
| 73 | 22 | "The College Try" | Tony Wharmby | J. J. Philbin | April 20, 2006 | 2T6272 | 5.36 |
| 74 | 23 | "The Party Favor" | Michael Lange | John Stephens | April 27, 2006 | 2T6273 | 5.41 |
| 75 | 24 | "The Man of the Year" | Tony Wharmby | Stephanie Savage | May 4, 2006 | 2T6274 | 5.10 |
| 76 | 25 | "The Graduates" | Ian Toynton | Story by : Bob DeLaurentis & Josh Schwartz; Teleplay by : Josh Schwartz | May 18, 2006 | 2T6275 | 6.40 |

=== Season 4 (2006–07) ===
| No. overall | No. in season | Title | Directed by | Written by | Original release date | Prod. code | U.S. viewers (millions) |
|---|---|---|---|---|---|---|---|
| 77 | 1 | "The Avengers" | Ian Toynton | Josh Schwartz & Stephanie Savage | November 2, 2006 | 3T5251 | 3.39 |
| 78 | 2 | "The Gringos" | Patrick Norris | John Stephens | November 7, 2006^{†} | 3T5252 | 3.54 |
| 79 | 3 | "The Cold Turkey" | Michael Lange | J. J. Philbin | November 9, 2006 | 3T5253 | 3.73 |
| 80 | 4 | "The Metamorphosis" | Norman Buckley | Leila Gerstein | November 16, 2006 | 3T5254 | 3.77 |
| 81 | 5 | "The Sleeping Beauty" | Ian Toynton | John Stephens | November 30, 2006 | 3T5255 | 3.67 |
| 82 | 6 | "The Summer Bummer" | Michael Lange | Josh Schwartz & Stephanie Savage | December 7, 2006 | 3T5256 | 3.82 |
| 83 | 7 | "The Chrismukk-huh?" | Ian Toynton | J. J. Philbin & John Stephens | December 14, 2006 | 3T5257 | 4.25 |
| 84 | 8 | "The Earth Girls Are Easy" | Norman Buckley | Mark Fish | December 21, 2006 | 3T5258 | 4.15 |
| 85 | 9 | "The My Two Dads" | Michael Schultz | Josh Schwartz & Stephanie Savage | January 4, 2007 | 3T5259 | 3.93 |
| 86 | 10 | "The French Connection" | John Stephens | J. J. Philbin | January 11, 2007 | 3T5260 | 3.83 |
| 87 | 11 | "The Dream Lover" | Patrick Norris | Leila Gerstein | January 18, 2007 | 3T5261 | 3.96 |
| 88 | 12 | "The Groundhog Day" | Ian Toynton | Mark Fish | January 25, 2007 | 3T5262 | 3.57 |
| 89 | 13 | "The Case of the Franks" | Norman Buckley | J. J. Philbin | February 1, 2007 | 3T5263 | 3.82 |
| 90 | 14 | "The Shake Up" | Ian Toynton | John Stephens | February 8, 2007 | 3T5264 | 3.58 |
| 91 | 15 | "The Night Moves" | Patrick Norris | Stephanie Savage | February 15, 2007 | 3T5265 | 3.65 |
| 92 | 16 | "The End's Not Near, It's Here" | Ian Toynton | Josh Schwartz | February 22, 2007 | 3T5266 | 6.59 |

^† - The second episode was shown first in Canada on Tuesday, November 7 at 8:00 p.m. ET on CTV. In the United States the episode aired the next day at 9:00 p.m. ET.

== Ratings ==
The O.C. : U.S. viewers per episode (millions)

| Season | Episode number | | | | | | | | | | | | | | | | | | | | | | | | | | |
| Season | 1 | 2 | 3 | 4 | 5 | 6 | 7 | 8 | 9 | 10 | 11 | 12 | 13 | 14 | 15 | 16 | 17 | 18 | 19 | 20 | 21 | 22 | 23 | 24 | 25 | 26 | 27 |
|---|---|---|---|---|---|---|---|---|---|---|---|---|---|---|---|---|---|---|---|---|---|---|---|---|---|---|---|
| 1 | 7.46 | 7.86 | 7.96 | 8.65 | 9.13 | 9.09 | 8.77 | 9.27 | 7.52 | 8.28 | 9.03 | 7.02 | 9.27 | 7.99 | 9.37 | 8.57 | 12.72 | 12.70 | 10.95 | 9.56 | 10.27 | 11.09 | 11.37 | 10.50 | 10.13 | 10.52 | 10.72 |
| 2 | 8.56 | 8.08 | 7.42 | 6.51 | 6.36 | 6.27 | 7.65 | 7.46 | 7.87 | 8.11 | 7.25 | 8.15 | 7.79 | 7.23 | 7.66 | 7.55 | 8.59 | 6.79 | 6.39 | 6.55 | 6.77 | 7.19 | 6.12 | 7.63 | – | | |
| 3 | 7.50 | 6.22 | 6.45 | 6.56 | 6.65 | 5.76 | 6.20 | 5.90 | 5.88 | 6.22 | 5.13 | 5.36 | 5.70 | 5.35 | 5.25 | 7.36 | 5.40 | 5.36 | 5.50 | 5.06 | 4.33 | 5.36 | 5.41 | 5.10 | 6.40 | – | |
| 4 | 3.39 | 3.54 | 3.73 | 3.77 | 3.67 | 3.82 | 4.25 | 4.15 | 3.93 | 3.83 | 3.96 | 3.57 | 3.82 | 3.58 | 3.65 | 6.59 | – | | | | | | | | | | |

Audience measurement performed by Nielsen Media Research

== Specials ==
Two special episodes, not part of the official continuity, were produced to complement the second season and were broadcast on Fox in the weeks leading up to the season premiere. The first documents the show's impact on popular culture, and the second provides "a day in the life" of the show.

| Special no. | Title | Directed by | Original air date | U.S. viewers (millions) |
|---|---|---|---|---|
| 1 | "The O.C.: Obsess Completely" | Brad Lachman | September 16, 2004 | 3.28 |
| 2 | "Welcome to The O.C.: A Day in the Life" | Brad Lachman | September 23, 2004 | 2.70 |
