= The Tiger Woman =

The Tiger Woman may refer to:

- The Tiger Woman (1917 film), a film starring Theda Bara
- The Tiger Woman (1944 film), a film serial starring Linda Stirling
- The Tiger Woman (1945 film), a film starring Adele Mara

== Nicknames ==
- Toni Jo Henry, American murderer
- Betty May, British singer, dancer, and model
- Clara Phillips, American chorus girl and murderer
