= Jaime King =

American actress and model (born 1979)

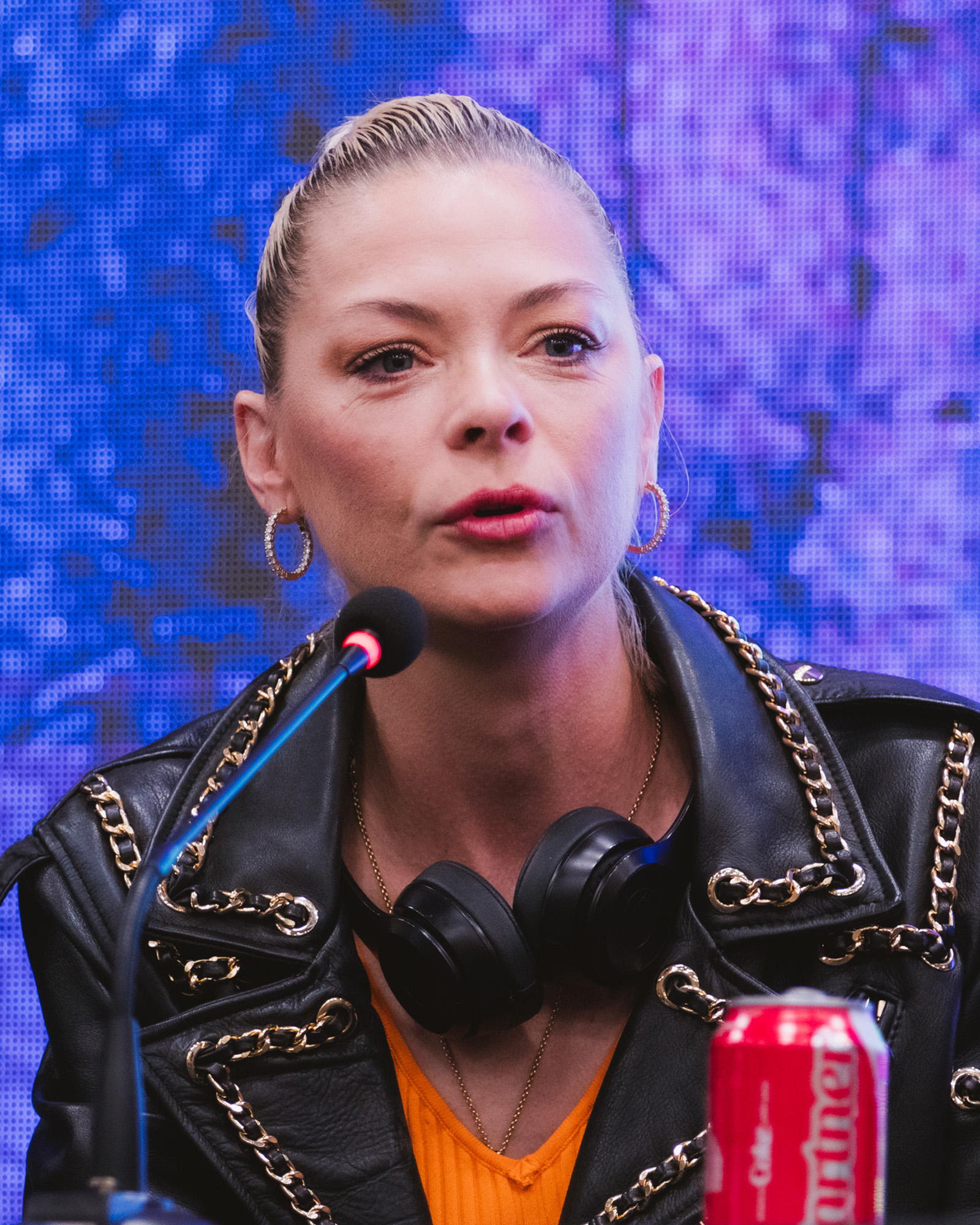
- King in 2025
- Born: April 23, 1979 (age 47); Omaha, Nebraska, U.S.
- Other names: James King; Jamie King; Jaime King-Newman
- Occupations: Actress; model
- Years active: 1993–present
- Spouses: Kyle Newman (m. 2007; div. 2023) Austin Sosa (m. 2025; sep. 2026)
- Children: 2
- Modeling information
- Height: 175 cm (5 ft 9 in)
- Agency: Next Model Management (New York, London, Los Angeles); Why Not Model Management (Milan)

Jaime Barbara King (born April 23, 1979) is an American actress and model best known for her roles in the TV series Hart of Dixie (2011–2015) and Black Summer (2019–2021), and in films such as Pearl Harbor (2001), Slackers (2002), White Chicks (2004), Sin City (2005), Cheaper by the Dozen 2 (2005), Sin City: A Dame to Kill For (2014), Ocean’s 8 (2018) and Lights Out (2024).

King was discovered at age 14 in 1993 and became a successful model, appearing in Vogue, Mademoiselle and Harper's Bazaar, among other fashion magazines. From 1998, she moved into acting, taking small film roles. Her first major role was in Pearl Harbor (2001) and her first starring movie role was in Bulletproof Monk (2003). She has since appeared in films including cult classics like White Chicks (2004) and Sin City (2005), as well as My Bloody Valentine 3D (2009), Waiting for Forever (2010), The Pardon (2013), Sin City: A Dame to Kill For (2014), Ocean’s 8 (2018), Out of Death (2021), Code Name Banshee (2022), and Lights Out (2024).

King has starred in television series including the TV hit comedy-drama Hart of Dixie (2011–2015), Star Wars: The Clone Wars (2009–2012) and the Netflix series Black Summer (2019–2021).

== Early life ==
Jaime Barbara King was born on April 23, 1979, in the suburbs of Omaha, Nebraska, the daughter of Nancy King, a former beauty queen, and Robert King. She has an older sister Sandi, an older brother Barry and a younger brother Robert (Robbie). King was named after Lindsay Wagner's character, Jaime Sommers, on the 1970s television series The Bionic Woman. King's parents separated in 1994.

King attended Westside High School in Omaha, dropping out in 1995 in order to pursue a modelling career in New York City. She attended modeling school; Nancy Bounds' Studios. She later enrolled in a home-study program run by the University of Nebraska–Lincoln.

== Modeling career ==
King was discovered in November 1993, at age 14, while attending the modeling school Nancy Bounds' Studios. After being spotted at her graduation fashion show by model agent Michael Flutie, King was invited to New York City to begin modeling professionally. She joined Company Management, which already represented Jaime Rishar, a more established model. To avoid confusion, King opted to use her childhood nickname, James, for the duration of her modeling career and later, at the beginning of her film career. Her breakthrough shoot was an advertisement for Abercrombie & Fitch in 1994.

King had a successful early career as a fashion model, and by age 15 she had been featured in the fashion magazines Vogue, Mademoiselle, Allure, and Seventeen. At sixteen, King had appeared in Glamour and Harper's Bazaar. She was featured in the cover story of the New York Times Magazine published on February 4, 1996, and had walked the runway for Chanel, Alexander McQueen and Christian Dior. In 1998, she began co-hosting MTV's fashion series, House of Style, with fellow model turned actress Rebecca Romijn. Despite her success, King noted that she "remember[s] the times where I was so alone" and thought she was "never gonna be able to be a kid."

In 2004, King, along with Halle Berry, Julianne Moore, and Eva Mendes was chosen as a spokesmodel for a high-profile ad campaign for Revlon. The advertisements were featured in print, television, theatrical, outdoor, and Internet venues, banking on their spokeswomen's "collective star power" to sell the cosmetics products. In 2006, King was chosen by Rocawear CEO Jay-Z to become the new face of the line; her advertisements were featured for the winter 2006 season.

== Acting career ==
=== Early work (1998–2004) ===
In 1999, King began her acting career and made her debut in the Daniel Waters' comedy Happy Campers, as Pixel. Happy Campers was screened at the Sundance Film Festival in 2001, and in 2003, King was nominated for Best Actress at the DVD Exclusive Awards. Filmed in 1999, she also appeared in Filter's music video for "Take a Picture". Following her debut acting roles, King appeared briefly in the film Blow, portraying the adult Kristina Jung, daughter of cocaine smuggler George Jung, played by Johnny Depp.

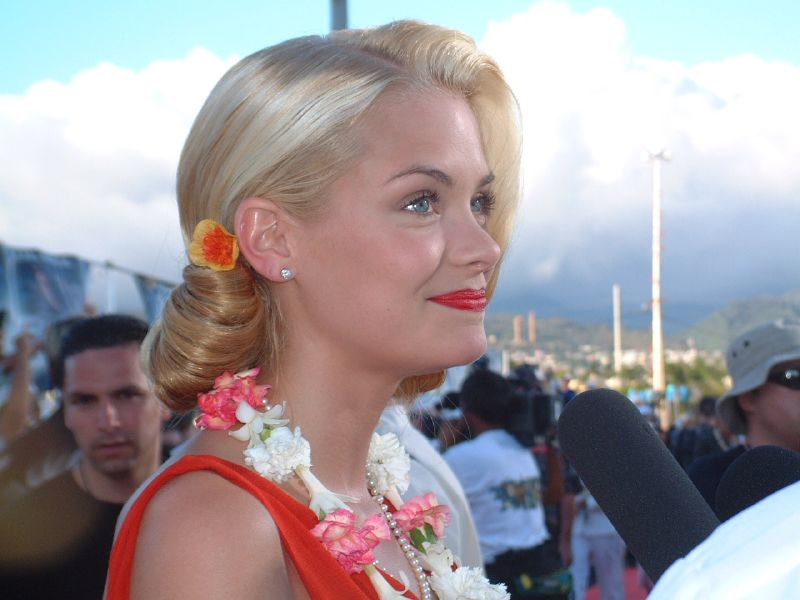
King at the Hawaiian premiere of Pearl Harbor in May 2001

King made her first appearance in a large Hollywood production with her role as a nurse, Betty Bayer, in the World War II epic romance Pearl Harbor (2001). Peter Travers of Rolling Stone magazine commented that King "has a lively minute or two" in the film, but her part was small and the "young cast is mostly pinup packaging". King went on to be featured in the Incubus music video "Wish You Were Here". The roles King took part in during 2001 garnered her the "New Stylemaker" title at the Young Hollywood Awards.

In 2002, she appeared in the teen comedy Slackers as Angela Patton, Four Faces of God as Sam, and the crime comedy Lone Star State of Mind as Baby. Slackers received negative responses from critics, including one who found that the characters "are not so strikingly original as to elevate the slack material", while Four Faces of God and Lone Star State of Mind did not have wide theatrical releases.

In 2003 starred in King in the film Bulletproof Monk, alongside Chow Yun-fat and Seann William Scott, an adaptation of a comic book by Brett Lewis and Michael Avon Oeming. This was King's first leading action film role. Bulletproof Monk was nominated for Choice Movie in a Drama/Action Adventure award at the Teen Choice Awards. In late 2003, King appeared in the music video for the Robbie Williams song, "Sexed Up", and on the cover artwork for the single's release.

In 2004, she appeared in the comedy White Chicks, playing Heather Vandergeld, with actress Brittany Daniel as her sister Megan Vandergeld, a parody on socialites Paris and Nicky Hilton. White Chicks was negatively reviewed by critics, receiving five nominations at the Razzie Awards in the categories for Worst Actress, Worst Director, Worst Picture, Worst Screen Couple and Worst Screenplay. However, White Chicks won Outstanding Directing for a Box Office Movie and Outstanding Writing for a Box Office Movie at the BET Comedy Awards.

=== Breakthrough (2005–09) ===
In 2005, King appeared in a variety of film and television roles. She first appeared in the independent black comedy and satire Pretty Persuasion, playing a small role as Kathy Joyce, the stepmother of Evan Rachel Wood's character. King landed dual roles (as twins) in the film adaptation of Frank Miller's graphic novel Sin City. She had met with director Robert Rodriguez, who was a fan of her work, and at the time King was unaware that Rodriguez wanted her involved in the film. Eventually, "we started reading [the Sin City graphic novel], and it was really fun". King portrayed Goldie and Wendy, the twin prostitutes in charge of the girls of Old Town, in the segment The Hard Goodbye opposite Mickey Rourke. Sin City featured a large ensemble cast of well-known actors which included Rosario Dawson and Jessica Alba, with whom King "kinda grew up together" in New York.

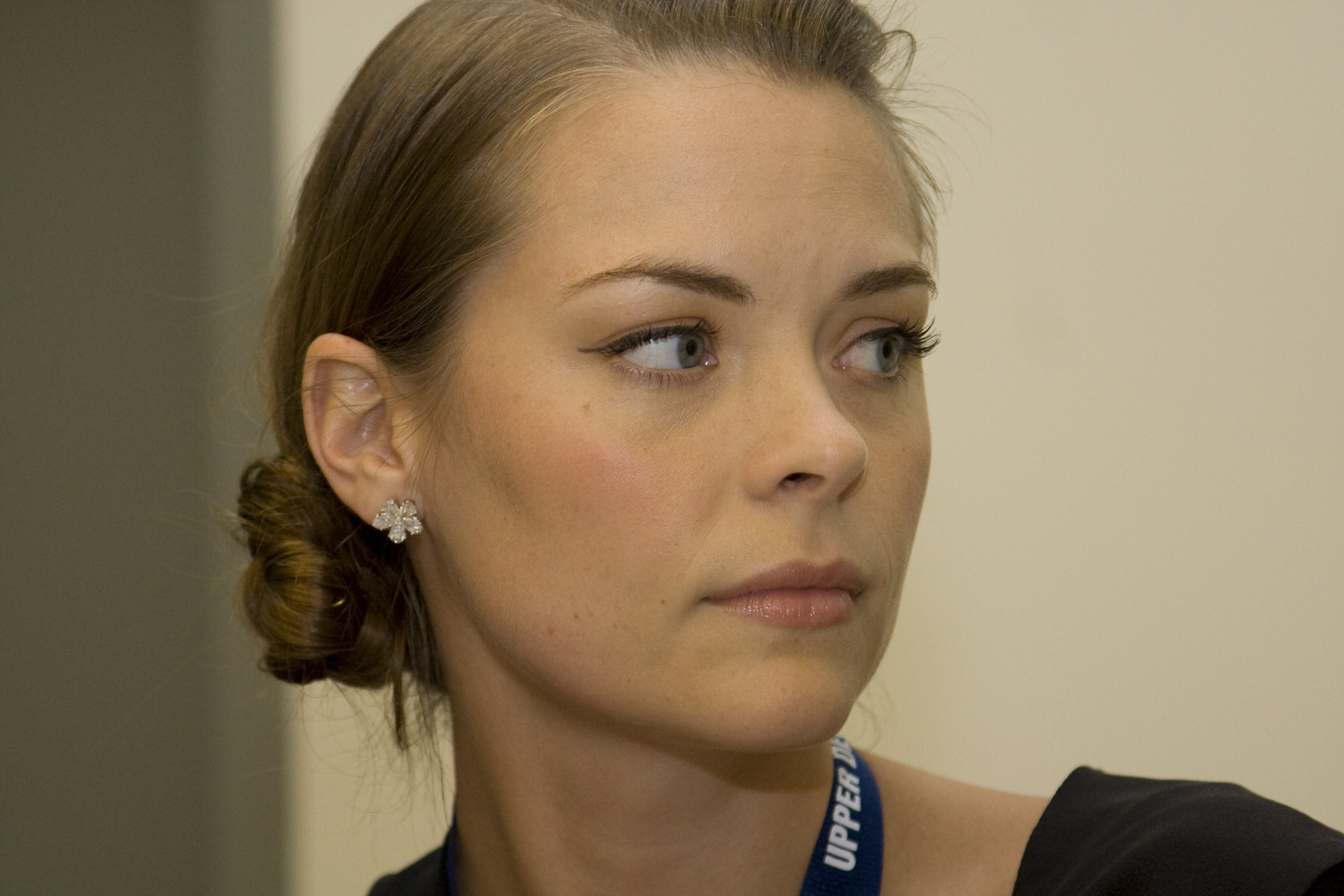
King at San Diego Comic-Con in July 2008

In Sin City, King was one of the few in the black and white film to have color, that being, red lips and blonde hair when acting as Goldie. The film was screened at the 2005 Cannes Film Festival in-competition and won the Technical Grand Prize for the film's "visual shaping." The family comedy Cheaper by the Dozen 2 featured King as Anne Murtaugh in another large ensemble cast. She also acted in the Al Pacino drama Two for the Money as Alexandria. Both films had negative critical and box office reception.

On television, she had a guest appearance on the teen drama The O.C. and a recurring role on the short-lived situation comedy Kitchen Confidential. King was featured in the Zach Braff-directed music video for Gavin DeGraw's "Chariot".

In 2006, King appeared with a small role as Heather in the comedy The Alibi and a starring role in the thriller True True Lie. Her largest role that year was in the David Arquette horror film The Tripper as Samantha. King had a recurring role on the short lived comedy The Class, which ended its run on television after an announcement in May 2007. The Class had been nominated for an Emmy Award in 2007, and it won the People's Choice Award for Favorite New TV Comedy.

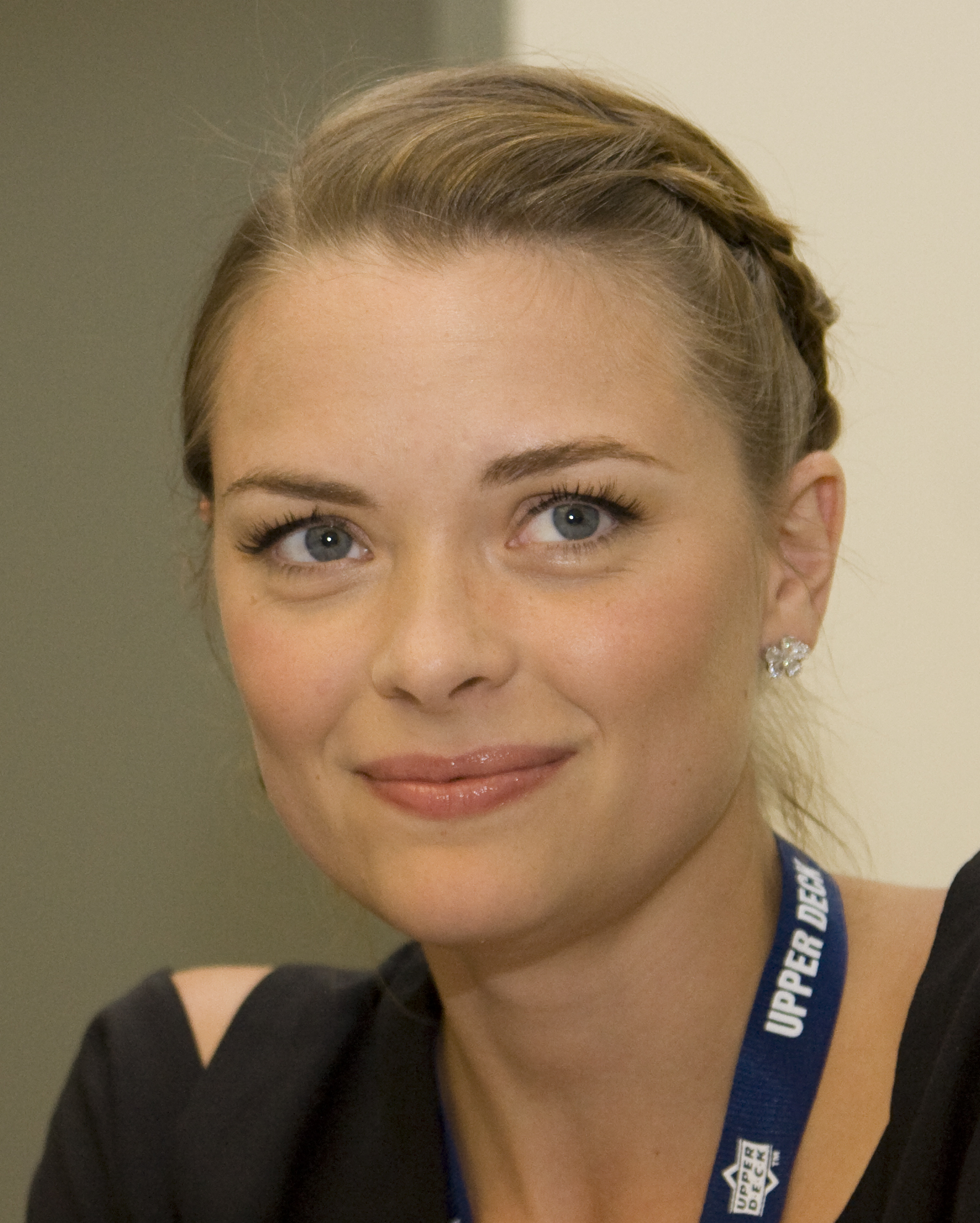
King in 2008

In 2007, King filmed They Wait, a horror-thriller film inspired by true events, with Terry Chen as her husband and Regan Oey as their son. She stars as a mother attempting to find the truth and save her son when threatened by spirits during the Chinese tradition of Ghost Month. It was featured in the 2007 Toronto International Film Festival, but has not yet had a wide theatrical release. However, it was broadcast on Lifetime Movie Network February 2015.

In 2008, King appeared as Lorelei in The Spirit, a live-action film adaptation based on the 1940s newspaper strip The Spirit created by Will Eisner. The role reunited King with Sin City writer Frank Miller, who wrote and directed the film. In May 2008, King featured in another Newman-directed film, Act I of The Cube, the beginning of an online movie-making contest.

In 2009, King played Sarah Palmer in the horror remake My Bloody Valentine 3D, and starred in the Star Wars-themed comedy Fanboys directed by Kyle Newman.

=== Hart of Dixie and other roles (2010–2019) ===
In the early 2010s, King starred in films such as the romantic comedy Waiting for Forever alongside Rachel Bilson and Tom Sturridge, Mother's Day, Red Tails, Silent Night, Barely Lethal, and in TV series including the ABC mockumentary comedy drama television series My Generation, Love Bites, and Comedy Bang! Bang!.

From 2009 to 2012, King starred in the TV series Star Wars: The Clone Wars. She played the role of Aurra Sing in the series Season 1 finale episode "Hostage Crisis" and later the final three episodes of Season 2: "Death Trap", "R2 Come Home", and "Lethal Trackdown" as well as an appearance in Season 3. She played three other characters in addition to Aurra Sing in the series. In the episode "Lightsaber Lost", she voices Cassie Cryar and Muk Muk Monkey. She voices a ticket droid in the episode "Lethal Trackdown".

In 2011, King landed the role of Lemon Breeland in the CW show Hart of Dixie, which premiered on September 26, 2011. The comedy-drama series taired on The CW from September 26, 2011, to March 27, 2015. The series, created by Leila Gerstein, stars Rachel Bilson as Dr. Zoe Hart, a New Yorker who, after her dreams of becoming a heart surgeon fall apart, accepts an offer to work as a general practitioner in the fictional Gulf Coast town of Bluebell, Alabama. King played Lemon Breeland, the main antagonist in Hart of Dixie.

In 2013, King starred in the film The Pardon, based on the true life story of Toni Jo Henry, the only woman to be electrocuted by Louisiana, stars King in the lead role with John Hawkes playing her partner-in-crime. The film's co-producer and writer Sandi Russell was quoted as saying: "Jaime carries this film. She is literally in every scene of the movie and given the subject matter, that is no small task."

In 2014, King reprised her role as twins Goldie and Wendy in the part sequel and part prequel of the Miller written and co-directed film Sin City: A Dame to Kill For.

King has appeared in various music videos including: Lana Del Rey's music video, "Summertime Sadness", which was directed by her husband, Kyle Newman, The Fray's hit single "Never Say Never", "Chariot" by Gavin DeGraw, and "Bury Me Alive" by the band We Are The Fallen.

In the late 2010s, King starred in films such as the dark comedy film Bitch, Escape Plan 2: Hades, Escape Plan: The Extractors, Ice Cream in the Cupboard, The Mistletoe Promise, and voiced roles in Robot Chicken and Transformers: Power of the Primes. King was also featured in See Know Evil, a 2018 documentary film about Davide Sorrenti.

=== Black Summer and film roles (2020–present) ===
From 2019 to 2021, King starred in the main role on the Netflix series Black Summer. The series is a horror drama television series spinoff of Z Nation, created by Karl Schaefer and John Hyams. King starred in the lead role as Rose, a mother who is separated from her daughter during the earliest and deadliest days of a zombie apocalypse. The series garnered moderate approval from fans and critics. Many of the filming locations are around and within Calgary, Alberta.

In 2021, King starred in the action thriller film Out of Death alongside Bruce Willis directed by Mike Burns. Willis plays a retired forest ranger who tries to help a woman played by King, after she witnesses a crime and finds herself running from a rural mountain town's corrupt police department.

In 2022, King starred in Code Name Banshee alongside Antonio Banderas and Tommy Flanagan, and directed by Jon Keeyes. Flanagan plays Caleb, a former government assassin in hiding, resurfaces when his protege, the equally deadly killer known as Banshee, played by King, discovers a bounty has been placed on Caleb's head, and they must put the past behind them and join one last time to fight off the secret CIA-backed killers who threaten to destroy them.

In 2023, King starred in the main role of the Lifetime film Hoax: The Kidnapping of Sherri Papini. The film is based on the case of the Sherri Papini kidnapping hoax, in which Sherri Papini staged her abduction after going missing in November 2016 while on a jog, she was eventually found and revealed to have staged the ordeal which became national news.

In 2024, King starred in Lights Out, an ensemble action thriller film directed by Christian Sesma and starring Frank Grillo, Mekhi Phifer, Dermot Mulroney and Scott Adkins. The film centers around an drifting ex-soldier turns into an underground fighter with the help of a just released ex-con, pitting them both against a crime boss, corrupt cops and hired killers.

== Personal life ==
King dated fashion photographer Davide Sorrenti, who died due to complications of Thalassemia in 1997. In 2000, she dated singer Kid Rock.

In 2006, she met director Kyle Newman while working on the set of his film Fanboys. The couple moved in together after three months of dating and got engaged in 2007. They married in November 2007 at Greystone Mansion, where Newman had proposed. After struggling with infertility due to endometriosis and polyendocrine metabolic ovarian syndrome (PMOS), King gave birth to a son in 2013 and to a second son in 2015. Taylor Swift is godmother to her younger son.

In May 2020, King filed for divorce from Newman after 14 years of marriage. King also filed a domestic violence prevention petition and was granted a temporary restraining order against Newman, which was later withdrawn. The divorce was finalized in September 2023. In March 2025, Newman was awarded sole physical custody and King was mandated to complete a 6-month substance rehabilitation program.

In July 2025, it was announced that King had become engaged to investment banker Austin Sosa. They later married in a private ceremony, and in January 2026 it was revealed that Sosa had filed for divorce.

King's struggles with addiction began when she started using heroin at age 14, which was given to her by a photo assistant on one of her first modeling jobs. In a 2023 interview with The Cut she shared: "I was 14 [when given heroin]. I also remember being naked as a 14-year-old, 15-year-old, 16-year-old, even at 13 years old, dude, it's — I remember being naked in a bathtub for Italian Vogue when I was not even 14 years old. I remember being given champagne, and I never knew what to do with that. How could any child know what it is to do with that? You're just trying to get through it, and there's this pervasive terror that if you don't participate, you'll be sent home."

King shared the trauma of her early modeling days living without family at 13 years old in New York: “I was terrified. I was terrified. I mean, I was a child. I think I was 13 and a half. The first time I came to New York, my mother and I came together, but when she eventually went home, I moved in with one of the editors of Harper’s Bazaar. After that, I was sort of shuffled between different people’s households, you know; basically, wherever my agent told me I should go, that’s where I was placed. I was a child, and this may sound harsh but I believe it’s true: A child at that age should not be in the fashion industry.” King made the decision to leave the modeling industry at age 18.

In October 2025, King revealed on Heather McDonald's podcast that she has ADHD and was diagnosed with autism in her late 20s after she discovered it was a common comorbidity.

== Filmography ==
Film
Year	Title	Role	Notes
2001	Happy Campers	Pixel	Credited as James King
2001	Blow	Older Kristina Sunshine Jung	Credited as James King
2001	Pearl Harbor	Nurse Betty Bayer	Credited as James King
2002	Four Faces of God	Sam	
2002	Slackers	Angela Patton	Credited as James King
2002	Lone Star State of Mind	Baby	
2003	Bulletproof Monk	Jade 'Bad Girl' Kerensky	
2004	White Chicks	Heather Vandergeld	
2005	Pretty Persuasion	Kathy Joyce	
2005	Sin City	Goldie and Wendy	Double role
2005	Two for the Money	Alexandria	
2005	Cheaper by the Dozen 2	Anne Murtaugh	
2006	True True Lie	Nathalie	
2006	The Alibi	Heather Price	
2006	The Tripper	Samantha / Sam	
2007	They Wait	Sarah	
2008	The Spirit	Lorelei	
2009	My Bloody Valentine 3D	Sarah Mercer-Palmer	
2009	Fanboys	Amber	Credited as Jaime King-Newman
2010	Waiting for Forever	Susan Donner	
2010	A Fork in the Road	April Rogers	
2010	Mother's Day	Beth Sohapi	
2012	Red Tails	'Axis Mary'	Voice role
2012	Silent Night	Deputy Aubrey Bradimore	
2013	The Pardon	Toni Jo Henry	
2014	Sin City: A Dame to Kill For	Goldie and Wendy	Double role
2015	Barely Lethal	Analyst Knight	
2016	The Mistletoe Promise	Elise Donner	
2017	Bitch	Beth	
2018	Escape Plan 2: Hades	Abigail Ross	
2018	See Know Evil	Herself	
2019	Escape Plan: The Extractors	Abigail Ross	
2019	Ice Cream in the Cupboard	Dr. Giselle Cohen	
2021	Out of Death	Shannon Mathers	
2022	Code Name Banshee	Delilah / Banshee	
2023	The Resurrection of Charles Manson	Annie	Also producer
2024	Lights Out	Detective Ellen Ridgway	
2025	Love, Danielle	Amy	
TBA	How to Cook Your Daughter		

Television
Year	Title	Role	Notes
2004	Harry Green and Eugene	Anna Marie	Unaired pilot
2005	The O.C.	Mary-Sue	Episode: "The Return of the Nana"
2005–2006	Kitchen Confidential	Tanya	Main role, 13 episodes
2006	The Worst Week of My Life	Paige	Episode: "Pilot"
2006–2007	The Class	Palmer	Recurring role, 6 episodes
2008–2009	Gary Unmarried	Vanessa Flood	Main role (season 1), 13 episodes
2009	Tit for Tat	Jaime	1 episode; also writer and producer
2009–2012	Star Wars: The Clone Wars	Luce / Nightsister / Aurra Sing / Customs Droid / Cassie Cryar / Muk Muk Monkey	Voice role, 7 episodes
2010	My Generation	Jackie Vachs	Main role
2010	Scream Queens	Herself	Season 2 host
2011–2015	Hart of Dixie	Lemon Breeland	Main role
2011	Celebrity Ghost Stories	Herself	Season 3, episode 1
2011	Love Bites	Amanda	Episode: "Modern Plagues"
2014	Comedy Bang! Bang!	Sheila Linter	Episode: "Dane Cook Wears a Black Blazer & Tailored Pants"
2016	Lip Sync Battle	Herself	Episode: "Olivia Munn vs. Kevin Hart"
2016	The Mistletoe Promise	Elise Donner	Hallmark movie
2016	Robot Chicken	Shani / Anita Radcliffe / Cleo de Nile	Voice role; episode: "Yogurt in a Bag"
2018	Transformers: Power of the Primes	Solus Prime	Voice role
2019–2021	Black Summer	Rose	Main role
2023	Hoax: The Kidnapping of Sherri Papini	Sherri Papini	Lifetime movie

Music videos
Year	Title	Artist
1999	"Take a Picture"	Filter
2003	"Sexed Up"	Robbie Williams
2005	"Chariot"	Gavin DeGraw
2009	"Never Say Never"	The Fray
2010	"Bury Me Alive"	We Are The Fallen
2012	"Summertime Sadness"	Lana Del Rey
2021	"One Last Time"	LP

As director
Year	Title	Notes
2011	The Break In	Short film
2011	Latch Key	Short film; also writer

== Awards and nominations ==
Year	Ceremony	Category	Work	Result
2001	Young Hollywood Awards	New Stylemaker – Female	N/A	Won
2003	DVD Exclusive Awards	Best Actress	Happy Campers	Nominated
