= Tim Neal =

Australian musician

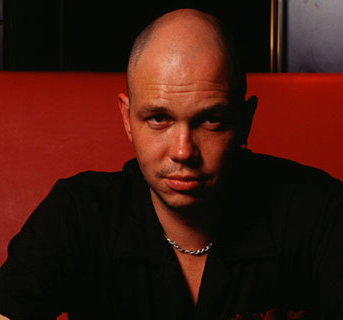
Tim Neal Australian B3 Hammond Player

Tim Neal is an Australian B3 Hammond organist and saxophonist. He has performed as part of the Paul Williamson Hammond Combo for about 20 years and in a number of other bands including The Swingin' Sidewalks, The Feelin' Groovies, Festa and Banana Oil. He also fronted his own Tim Neal Big Organ Band and The Tim Neal Trio.

Tim has toured extensively and played at many festivals, both in Australia and overseas. He has been a part of a number of Australian and International acts, including Guy Pearce's Unconscious Brothers and Steve Magnussen's Kinfolk.

Banana Oil won an Apra award in 1998 for their album Guava Lampo and the Paul Williamsons Hammond Combo was nominated for Apra award in 2001 for their album Live at the Espy. The Banana Oil song My Family was used in the movie Bedazzled starring Elizabeth Hurley in 2000.

== Discography ==
- Red Hot Go Paul Williamson Hammond Combo. New Market Music"(1993)
- Daze - HEADER - On High St Bark, Bark (1996)
- King Without A Clue Mushroom Records (1997)
- Ears For Civil Engines, Javabubbaboogaloo Jazzhead (1997)
- Guava Lampo, Banana Oil Mushroom Records (1998)
- Over the Rainbow Paul Williamson Hammond Combo New Market Music (1999)
- Festa Wide Jazzhead (2000)
- Here Comes The Night Augie March - Sunset Studies BMG Music (Australia) (2000)
- Get Happy Paul Williamson Hammond Combo New Market Music (2001)
- Walking After Midnight Deborah Conway. The Songs Of Patsy Cline Another Intercorps Production (2001)
- One Eyed Man Mushroom Records (2001)
- Wait Another Day Amity Dry - The Light House Universal Music Australia (2003)
- Wandering Song Various - The Coffee Lounge: Cappucino - Music To Watch The Days Go By EQ Music (2003)
- Month of Mondays Paul Williamson Hammond Combo New Market Music (2004)
- Super Sweet Corn (2004)
- Sometimes (as Tim Neil) John Butler Trio, The - Sunrise Over Sea Jarrah Records (2004)
- The Unconscious Brothers Unconconscious Brothers (2006)
- Tim Neal Live at Bernies (2010)
- Archie Roach( Into the Bloodstream) (2012)
