= Francis Stokes =

American screenwriter and film director

- Born: Annapolis, Maryland
- Occupations: Film director, screenwriter

Francis Stokes is an American screenwriter and film director. Stokes is writer and director of the feature film Harold Buttleman, Daredevil Stuntman and the internet video serial God, Inc..

Harold Buttleman, Daredevil Stuntman stars John Hawkes, Karen Black, Dan Castellaneta, Stephen Falk and Stephanie Jane Markham. He is also the creator of the former environmental weblog Sludgie.com, but the domain is no longer active.

== Career ==
Stokes attended studied film at New York University before moving to Los Angeles where he worked as a guide at Griffith Observatory while trying to sell screenplays. He wrote Buttleman in 1997 and brought John Hawkes into the project after having met him at a theater performance. He wrote and directed God, Inc. in early 2007.

== Filmography ==
As writer / director

- Harold Buttleman, Daredevil Stuntman (2003)
- God, Inc. (2007)
- Crickets (2009)

As actor

- Spinning the Web (2009) as Himself
- President Wolfman (2012 (voice)
