= Michael Flutie =

Michael Flutie (born October 30, 1958) is an American model agent, talent brand manager, and New York City-based media personality.

== Early career ==
After graduating from New York University, Flutie began his career in the fashion industry working at Elite Model Management in 1982 when founder John Casablancas ran the agency. Throughout the 1980s, Michael worked with top models of the time including Stephanie Seymour, Cindy Crawford, Tatjana Patitz, Frederique van der Wal, Carré Otis, and Milla Jovovich, among others.

In the late 1980s, Michael moved to Paris and worked at City Models, an agency run by ex-model Louise Despointes. While in Paris, Michael worked directly with models such as Carla Bruni and Famke Janssen.

== Company Management ==
Michael returned to New York and founded his own modeling agency, Company Management, in 1990 with the help of his mother and two brothers. Focusing on non-traditional beauty and developing models with extensive editorial background, Michael became a new force in the modeling world.

By the mid-1990s, this boutique agency became a major player in American modeling and was considered a rival to top agencies Ford Models and Elite. He discovered hundreds of new models and developed the careers of Beri Smither, Amy Wesson, Jaime King, Rhea Durham, Alexis Bledel, Frankie Rayder, Jamie Rishar, Kristine Szabo, Sarah Murdoch (née O'Hare), Carina Wretman, and Bridget Moynahan.

Flutie advocated for the fair treatment of models and even voiced support for a model's union or guild to protect their interests.

Flutie became directly embroiled in the heroin chic modeling controversy that dominated the fashion world in the mid-1990s and lobbied against the glamorization and use of drugs in the fashion community. This came to a crescendo when young fashion photographer Davide Sorrenti died of an overdose from heroin in February 1997. Davide’s girlfriend at the time, Flutie’s rising star Jaime King, was taking a break from modeling and was battling drug and alcohol addiction of her own. Later that same year in 1997, Flutie again garnered attention when he fired and sued his model Amy Wesson when she was battling her own addictions and kept missing job bookings.

In the late 1990s, Michael wore a new hat as a publicist when he started a PR firm called Flutie Media that complemented the modeling agency. Around the same time, Flutie’s brother Robert Flutie established Flutie Entertainment, a talent management firm for actors and entertainers eventually based in Los Angeles.

After experiencing a major downturn in business, being targeted by a class action lawsuit by models, and other struggles, Company Management eventually stopped representing models after the turn of the millennium. The corporate entity filed for bankruptcy protection in the fall of 2002.

== MFO and Talent Brand Management ==
Flutie began managing celebrity talent and experts for brand partnership and licensing deals beginning in 2003. Flutie called this new venture MFO and clients initially included Thom Filicia and Kyan Douglas from Queer Eye for the Straight Guy. Flutie orchestrated Thom’s endorsement deal with Pier 1 Imports in 2003, Xerox in 2004, and numerous other projects. Flutie put together a deal for Kyan to be a spokesperson and product advisor for L’Oreal in 2004. The Pier 1 and L'Oreal deals were considered groundbreaking in terms of an openly gay person representing a major corporation’s products.

Flutie worked with country music superstar Tim McGraw on his fragrance with Coty, Inc. called McGraw, launched in the summer of 2008. The McGraw fragrance won two prestigious FiFi Awards in May 2009. Flutie then collaborated with Tim McGraw's wife superstar Faith Hill on her Coty fragrance called Faith Hill Parfums, launched in late 2009.

Other clients of MFO include fashion stylists Mary Alice Stephenson and Annabel Tollman, models Beri Smither and Kristine Szabo, and the YMA Fashion Scholarship Fund.

== Madwood ==
Flutie collaborated with business partners to establish Madwood Media in 2007. At the beginning of 2012, Madwood partnered with Cris Abrego Productions and Endemol Shine USA under 51 Minds. Madwood specializes in pop culture, fashion, beauty and lifestyle productions for both television and online portals. Projects include the first reality web series Under the Arch a digital magazine with daily content focusing on NYU undergraduates. "Under the Arch" acted as a platform to document college students and their passion for music, fashion and products. Flutie coined the term "webverts", combining web content and storytelling with advertising. Other unscripted shows including Scouted on the E! television network, which focused on discovering new model talent that aired in late 2011 and early 2012 and Model Employee, which Flutie created and executive produced for VH1 in 2013. This show followed a group of models as they tried to become the new face of the Mandalay Bay Resort in Las Vegas.

In June 2016, after three years of working with Cris Abrego and Endemol Shine USA, Michael partnered with Kevin Bartel and Richard McKerrow at Love Productions USA to produce unscripted content that influences the zeitgeist of pop culture and beyond. In addition to Love Productions, Flutie has a partnership with Chip Seelig, the managing partner of The Seelig Group to develop new media ventures and live events. Flutie is currently developing his first scripted series with Andrew Lenchewski and Martin Zimmerman.

== Media work and appearances ==
Flutie has frequently appeared in television, newspapers, magazine and online content, usually in recognition for his expertise in modeling and corporate endorsements.

He appeared in the Style Section of The New York Times in 1999 with a profile on his fashion sense.

Flutie appeared in the MTV Made broadcast in the fourth season in 2004 on the episode about two sisters Megan and Katelyn Gelber wanting to become movie stars. Flutie was the expert guiding them throughout the episode and helping to achieve their dream.

Flutie has publicly commented on topics ranging from the Kate Moss cocaine scandal in 2005, Madonna dating young Brazilian model Jesus Luz in 2009, and the feasibility of a Michael Jackson fragrance in 2011.

Flutie co-produced the reality show America's Most Smartest Model on the VH1 network in 2007. The series featured Flutie client and fashion expert Mary Alice Stephenson as a co-host of the show. In 2011, Flutie was the executive producer as well as a cast member of Scouted on the E! network, sold The Annabel Tollman Project to the Bravo network, as well as The Traders to the AMC network. In 2012, he was the executive producer of Model Employee on VH1.

Flutie executive produced the Netflix series Westside in 2018. He is also one of the three creators, alongside Kevin Bartel and Sean Patrick Murray.
