= Alignment Artist Capital =

Financial firm

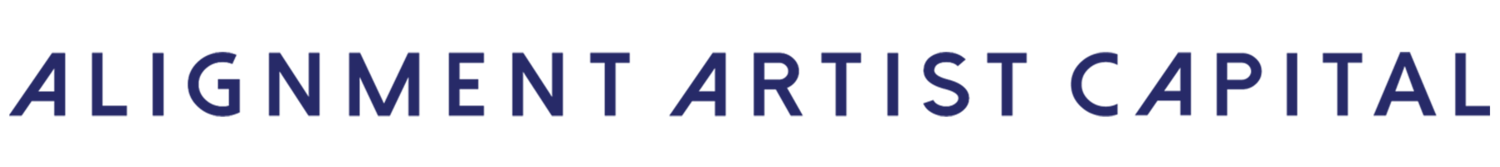
- Industry: financial services
- Founded: April 2015
- Founder: James Diener; Howard Lipson
- Services: provides funds to music artists & songwriters
- Website: www.alignmentartist.com

Alignment Artist Capital (AAC) is a financial firm. It was founded in April 2015 by James Diener and Howard Lipson. AAC provides funds to music artists and songwriters. AAC is backed by the Alternative Investors arm of BlackRock Inc.

Artists who secure funds from Alignment Artist Capital may use them to invest in or expand their businesses, build their audience or create new works. Alignment Artist Capital makes structured investments of between $5 million and $20 million per transaction, with a four to five-year horizon into the business entity of established recording artists, songwriters or producers.

Its co-founders are music executive and former head of A&M/Octone Records, James Diener, and private equity investor Howard Lipson. Octone's structure and private equity backing made it unique among other independent labels, which led to it being the subject to a Harvard Business School case study. Alignment board members include Diener, Lipson and BlackRock Alternative Investors managing director Matthew Bottein, as well as Patrick Q. Riordan.
