= Toni Jo Henry =

American murderer (1916–1942)

- Born: Annie Beatrice McQuiston; January 3, 1916; Shreveport, Louisiana, U.S.
- Died: November 28, 1942 (aged 26); Lake Charles, Calcasieu Parish, Louisiana, U.S.
- Other name: Tony Jo Hood
- Known for: Only woman ever to be executed by electric chair in Louisiana
- Conviction: First degree murder
- Penalty: Death

Toni Jo Henry (née Annie Beatrice McQuiston; January 3, 1916 – November 28, 1942) was an American murderer, and the only woman ever to be executed in Louisiana's electric chair.

Married to Claude 'Cowboy' Henry, she decided to break her husband out of the Texas State Penitentiary, where he was serving a 50-year sentence for murder. Together with Horace 'Arkie' Burks, she took a ride with Joseph P. Calloway, whom they then robbed and murdered. Toni Jo Henry was convicted and sentenced to death. After three separate trials, she was executed by electrocution on November 28, 1942. Her case generated several popular books and films including A Savage Wisdom and Stone Justice.

== Biography ==
Henry was born Annie Beatrice McQuiston in Shreveport, Louisiana, on January 3, 1916, the third of five children. She lived with her grandmother for a while, while her mother was ill. Her mother died of tuberculosis when Henry was six years old. After her mother died she lived with her father and stepmother, although always wanted to return to living with her grandmother.

Henry worked part-time in a macaroni factory at thirteen but was sacked when the manager found out there was tuberculosis in her family. After her father beat her for losing her job, she left home and became a street hustler and prostitute, changing her name to Toni Jo Hood. She later worked in a brothel in Shreveport's red-light district. Henry was addicted to cocaine at this time and also plied her trade in other parts of Louisiana and South Texas.

In 1939, she met Claude Henry, one of her customers, in Austin, Texas. A down-on-his-luck prize fighter, Cowboy, as he was known, fell in love with the young woman. Married on November 25, 1939, the couple honeymooned in southern California.

Upon returning from California, Claude Henry was arrested for the murder of a former San Antonio police officer, Arthur Sinclair, prior to their marriage. He was found guilty in January 1940 and sentenced to fifty years in the Texas State Penitentiary at Huntsville.

== Murder of Joseph P. Calloway ==
Toni Jo then began contemplating plans to break her husband out of Huntsville Prison. She recruited an accomplice, an ex-con and army deserter named Horace Finnon 'Arkie' Burks, who claimed to know the layout of the penitentiary. The pair devised a plan to rob a bank, in hopes of securing money to aid in breaking Claude Henry out of jail. Two teenagers were persuaded to break into a gun store and steal guns and ammunition for them to use. Joseph P. Calloway was delivering a Ford Coupe to a friend when he happened upon Toni Jo and Arkie Burks who were hitchhiking. Unaware of their plan, he offered to give the two a ride.

As they drove past Jennings, Louisiana, Toni Jo and Arkie robbed Calloway at gunpoint. They proceeded to lock him in the trunk of his car and drive down a country road. The duo planned to use the Ford as a getaway vehicle; however, they soon decided to pull the car over on a country track. Calloway was ordered out of the car. He was then ushered into a field and told to strip as Henry wanted a change of clothes for her husband when they broke him out of prison. Calloway was then shot once in the head with a .32 caliber revolver and died at the scene.

When they reached Camden, Arkansas, Arkie became concerned about how far Henry would go to break her husband out of prison and left her, taking the car.

=== Arrests, trials and appeals ===
Henry returned to Shreveport by bus, where she sought refuge with her aunt, Emma, and told her she had murdered a man near Lake Charles, Louisiana. The aunt contacted her brother, who was a Louisiana State trooper, and Henry was arrested. She was later interviewed by a Shreveport police officer, during which she confessed to the murder and disclosed the location of the body.

Her first trial was held from March 27–29, 1940 at Calcasieu Courthouse. Because of Henry's good looks, the severity of the charges against her, and the possibility of the death penalty, the trial gained much coverage by the press, which dubbed her the Tiger Woman. She claimed that Burks was the one who fired the fatal shot, but after deliberating for six hours, the jury convicted her and sentenced her to death by hanging. Burks was later convicted and sentenced to death. Henry appealed and was granted a new trial on the grounds that publicity surrounding the trial prejudiced the outcome.

The second trial took place in February 1941. Unlike in the first trial, Burks took the stand and testified against Henry. Following an hour of jury deliberations, she was again convicted and sentenced to death. She again appealed and was granted a new trial.

The third trial was held in January 1942. Henry was again convicted and sentenced to death. She appealed, but this time her appeal was denied. An appeal to the Governor, Sam H. Jones, for clemency also failed.

=== Execution ===
While Henry was incarcerated at Lake Charles Prison, she was befriended by Father Wayne Richard, head of a local Catholic parish. He would eventually baptize her.

During the time Henry was being tried, Louisiana changed its method of execution from hanging to death by electrocution, the sentence being carried out on November 28, 1942, in the basement of Calcasieu Parish courthouse. The portable electric chair was later used at Burks's execution in March 1943. The district attorney was Griffin T. Hawkins of Lake Charles. Father Richard was present at her execution and would officiate her burial, days later. Four days prior to her execution, Claude Henry escaped from prison to see his wife one last time and was recaptured in Beaumont, Texas. Soon afterwards, he was paroled due to ill health. Henry was shot to death by a café owner on July 15, 1945, in Dallas, while out on parole.

== Books and film ==
The radio show Gangbusters serialized Toni Jo's story in an episode that aired in February 1943.

A Savage Wisdom, a novel by Norman German, was inspired by the life, crimes and legends of Toni Jo Henry. The book is fiction, a novel categorized in the subgenre of "alternative history." It changes certain facts of the historical woman's life and posits what might have happened under different circumstances.

Henry's story is the focus of the 2013 film entitled The Pardon, which was shot on location in Shreveport. It stars actress Jaime King as Toni Jo Henry. John Hawkes plays Arkie Burks, with TJ Thyne, Jason Lewis, Leigh Whannell, and Tim Guinee. Tom Anton is the producer and director.

On September 10, 2016, Toni Jo's story was profiled in the third episode for the tenth season of Deadly Women, titled "Bad to the Bone".

In 2016, another biography about Henry, Stone Justice by Lyn Morgan and Debi King McMartin, was published.

In the Oct. 24, 1953 issue of The New Yorker, a mini-review of "Crimes of Passion" by Edward R. Radin notes that "[a]mong the eleven culprits considered" in the book is "Toni Jo Henry, who was by way of being a one-woman crime wave."

== Bibliography ==
- Baker, David V. (2015). Women and Capital Punishment in the United States: An Analytical History. McFarland. ISBN 9781476622880.
- Gillespie, L. Kay (2009). Executed Women of 20th and 21st Centuries. University Press of America. ISBN 9780761845676.
- Nash, Jay Robert (1992). World Encyclopedia of 20th Century Murder. Rowman & Littlefield. ISBN 9781590775325.
- O'Shea, Kathleen A. (1999). Women and the Death Penalty in the United States, 1900–1998. Greenwood Publishing Group. ISBN 9780275959524.
