= Waiting for Forever =

- Theatrical release poster
- Directed by: James Keach
- Written by: Steve Adams
- Produced by: James Keach; Trevor Albert; John Papsidera; Jane Seymour; Richard Arlook; Jack Giarraputo
- Starring: Rachel Bilson; Tom Sturridge; Jaime King; Nikki Blonsky; Scott Mechlowicz; Blythe Danner; Roz Ryan; Richard Jenkins
- Cinematography: Matthew Irving
- Edited by: Pamela March
- Music by: Nick Urata
- Production company: PCH Film
- Distributed by: Freestyle Releasing
- Release dates: February 10, 2010 (Santa Barbara); February 4, 2011 (United States)
- Running time: 94 minutes
- Country: United States
- Language: English
- Budget: $5 million
- Box office: $25,517

Waiting for Forever is a 2010 American romance film directed by James Keach and starring Rachel Bilson and Tom Sturridge. The film had a limited theatrical release beginning February 4, 2011.

== Plot ==
Emma (Rachel Bilson) and Will (Tom Sturridge) were childhood best friends; they lost touch a long time ago—as far as she knows. She is back in their hometown, because her father Richard is terminally ill. She has a strained relationship with her mother Miranda.

Will is a vagabond street performer (juggler). As a man and woman driving across country give hitchhiking Will a ride back home, Will tells them the story of how he fell in love with Emma and how she was with him when his parents died in a train accident when he was ten years old. Upon arrival he visits his brother Jim, a banker, who believes Will has mental problems because of the death of their parents and Will's obsession with Emma. Will then stays with his childhood friend Joe, telling him he is going to announce his love for Emma to her tomorrow.

Emma's boyfriend Aaron follows her home because he wants to reconcile, staying at a local hotel. Will finally speaks to Emma, and they spend the day together, reminiscing on times passed. She admits, to Will, her unfaithfulness to her boyfriend, who wants to marry her. Will then discloses he has been following her everywhere for years, but does not get the chance to explain his love for her, as she is distressed at his stalking behavior. She asks him to promise that he will stop following her. Will agrees to, heartbroken, and leaves town.

It is revealed that Emma's boyfriend accidentally killed the man with whom Emma was having an affair, and she is not aware of this. When her boyfriend finds out that Will has been following Emma, he calls the Los Angeles police and claims it was Will who committed the killing.

Will decides to hitchhike away from his hometown. On his way he is arrested by the highway patrol and taken to jail. Jim bails him and takes him to the airport. Will runs away to San Francisco, leaving behind money to make up for the bail his brother paid.

Emma is shaken with the news of her lover's death, and Will's implication, but then gets a letter from Will proving he wasn't in Los Angeles when the man was killed, referring her to the couple that had earlier given him the ride home. She calls them, then realizes what had really occurred and gets her boyfriend arrested.

Richard dies. Emma goes to Joe and asks him to tell Will that she is sorry for what she had said to him and what had happened.

Some time after Richard's funeral she receives a love letter, via Jim, from Will. It tells her how he believed he would always be with her, forever, and how much he loves her. She leaves for San Francisco to look for him, finding him performing on Fisherman's Wharf. He asks her, "Are you following me?", and they hug and laugh together.

== Cast ==
- Rachel Bilson as Emma Twist
  - Mia O'Neil as Young Emma
- Tom Sturridge as Will Donner
  - Kellet Cook as Young Will
- Blythe Danner as Miranda Twist, Emma's mother
- Richard Jenkins as Richard Twist, Emma's father
- Scott Mechlowicz as Jim Donner, Will's brother
- Jaime King as Susan Donner, Jim's wife
- Nikki Blonsky as Dolores
- Nelson Franklin as Joe
- K.C. Clyde as Dennis
- Roz Ryan as Dorothy
- Matthew Davis as Aaron
- Larry Filion as Larry, the bartender
- Richard Gant as Albert
- K. Danor Gerald as Detective 2
- Frank Gerrish as taxi driver
- Charles Halford as State Trooper
- Borzin Mottaghian as driver
- Joseph D. Reis as homeless man
- Andrew Roach as Stewart
- John Ross as Will's father
- Michelle Sebekzes as Will's mother
- Ace Olson as Amos, Will's nephew

The soundtrack to the film featured songs by Nick Urata and The Mostar Diving Club.

== Reception ==
Waiting for Forever went into limited theatrical release on February 4, 2011, and played from three to 14 theaters during its two-week run. With a production budget of US$5 million, it grossed $25,517.

The film was panned by critics. As of June 2020, the film holds a 5% approval rating on review aggregate site Rotten Tomatoes, based on 19 reviews with an average rating for 2.31/10. Stephen Holden of The New York Times wrote, "More often than not, I felt suffocated by the gaseous sentimentality and lightheadedness of a story that drops in subplots that it can't begin to develop." David Noh of Film Journal International found the Will character to be "nothing more than a stalker, and it is the premise of James Keach's idiotic simper of a film that you find his behavior not only somehow justifiable, but irresistible. ... Keach tries to amp things up in the last act by throwing in a supposed murder that is merely groan-inducing, especially when you realize that this will only extend the already excruciating exposition." While acceding Noh's former point, Pete Hammond of Boxoffice nonetheless called it a "refreshingly pure, honest and original love story", and bemoaned that, "a small movie that sports no real exploitative elements except genuine human interactions is a tough sell."
