= Trevor Albert =

American film producer

Trevor Albert is an American film producer. He is known for producing the film Groundhog Day (1993). Albert is from Los Angeles and is former chairman of The Harold Ramis Film School at Second City.

== Filmography ==
Year	Film	Notes
1986	Club Paradise	Associate producer
1993	Groundhog Day	
1995	Stuart Saves His Family	
1996	Multiplicity	
2000	Bedazzled	
2002	The First $20 Million Is Always the Hardest	
2003	The League of Extraordinary Gentlemen	Executive producer
2005	Because of Winn-Dixie	
2010	Waiting for Forever	
2014	Glen Campbell: I'll Be Me	Documentary
