= Westside (2018 TV series) =

American music reality show on Netflix

- Genre: Music; Reality
- Written by: Keith Harrison
- Directed by: James Carroll
- Starring: Sean Patrick Murray; Pia Toscano
- Country of origin: United States
- Original language: English
- No. of seasons: 1
- No. of episodes: 8

Production
- Executive producers: Kevin Bartel; Michael Flutie; Sun de Graaf; James Diener; Melinda Kelly
- Cinematography: James Carroll; Lewis Wilcox
- Running time: 46–58 minutes
- Production companies: Love Productions; Madwood Studios

Original release
- Network: Netflix
- Release: November 9, 2018

Westside is an American music reality television show on Netflix. The eight-episode first season was released on November 9, 2018. The series follows the journey of nine musicians exploring the music industry, trying to break through and become stars. As the cast members work to improve their notability, they work with producers and agents to create original music videos and prepare for a nightclub performance in Los Angeles.

The project is a groundbreaking documentary musical that chronicles the lives of nine performers. It features original songs written by nineteen Grammy Award–winning songwriters, each composition inspired by defining moments in the performers’ lives. Produced as a series of independent music videos, the pieces were later integrated into an eight-hour documentary presentation.

== Cast ==
- Alexandra Kay
- Taz Zavala
- Caitlin Ary
- James Byous
- Arika Gluck
- Keith Harrison
- Austin Kolbe
- Sean Patrick Murray
- Pia Toscano
- Leo Gallo

== Episodes ==
No.	Title	Original release date
1	"Ensemble"	November 9, 2018
2	"Survival"	November 9, 2018
3	"Structure"	November 9, 2018
4	"Process"	November 9, 2018
5	"Pressure"	November 9, 2018
6	"Critique"	November 9, 2018
7	"Support"	November 9, 2018
8	"The End of the Beginning"	November 9, 2018

== Soundtrack ==
A soundtrack for the series was released in 2018 by Warner Bros. Records. The soundtrack contains group performances and solos songs.

No.	Title	Length
1.	"We Are The Ones"	3:45
2.	"Be-You-Tiful (feat. Arika Gluck)"	3:48
3.	"Vibe (feat. Taz Zavala, Leo Gallo & Arika Gluck)"	4:00
4.	"2 Grams (feat. James Byous)"	3:15
5.	"Sure as Hell Hope (feat. Caitlin Ary & Alexandra Kay)"	3:22
6.	"All I Wanna Be (feat. Sean Patrick Murray)"	3:54
7.	"Can't Find the Words (feat. Caitlin Ary)"	3:05
8.	"Back at the Bottom (feat. Taz Zavala)"	3:31
9.	"Lights of the City"	3:51
10.	"Everybody Loves the Winner (feat. Austin Kolbe)"	3:19
11.	"Candle in a Hurricane (feat. Pia Toscano)"	4:16
12.	"Future Is in My Hands (feat. Leo Gallo)"	3:04
13.	"Champagne High (feat. Alexandra Kay, Taz Zavala & Pia Toscano)"	4:24
14.	"Feed That Flame (feat. James Byous & Caitlin Ary)"	3:28
15.	"Beauty & the Struggle (feat. Taz Zavala & Arika Gluck)"	3:22
16.	"You Think You Know Someone (feat. Alexandra Kay)"	3:24
17.	"For the Love (feat. Leo Gallo & Pia Toscano)"	3:21
18.	"Believe in Dreams (feat. Pia Toscano)"	3:29
19.	"Love in Action"	3:32
20.	"Westside Finale"	7:12
