= Hysteric Glamour =

Japanese designer label

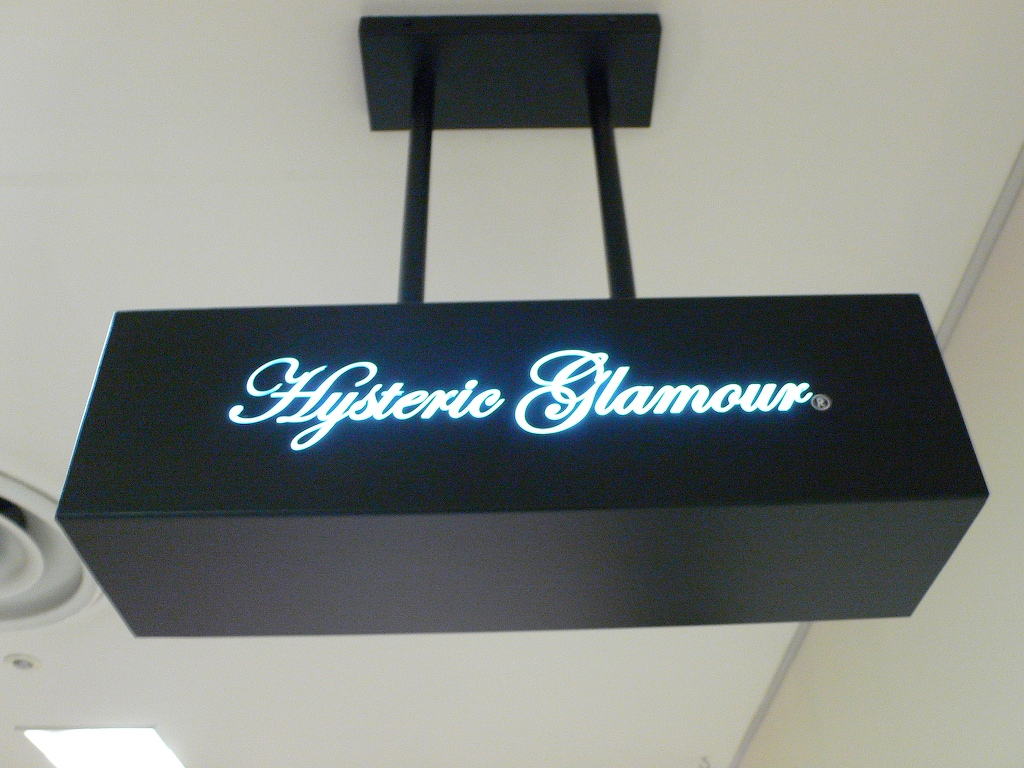
- Hysteric Glamour storefront signage in the Harajuku district of Tokyo, Japan, c. 2006.
- Type: Subsidiary
- Industry: Fashion
- Founded: June 1984; 42 years ago
- Founder: Nobuhiko Kitamura
- Headquarters: Tokyo, Japan
- Number of locations: Approx. 52 retail stores
- Area served: Worldwide
- Key people: Nobuhiko Kitamura (Creative Director / Founder)
- Products: Ready-to-wear, jeans, leather jackets, cardigans, apparel accessories
- Owner: Nobuhiko Kitamura
- Parent: Ozone Community Co., Ltd.
- Website: hystericglamour.co.jp

Hysteric Glamour is a Japanese fashion label founded by designer Nobuhiko Kitamura in 1984. The brand is best known for its graphic-heavy clothing that blends mid-to-late 1980s American pop culture, punk rock music, and vintage Americana.

== History ==
Hysteric Glamour was founded in 1984 by Japanese fashion designer Nobuhiko Kitamura under the Ozone Community corporate umbrella. Kitamura, a graduate of Tokyo Mode Gakuen, drew heavy stylistic inspiration from mid-20th century Western counterculture, incorporating elements of punk rock, new wave music, pop art, comic book illustrations, and hippie movements into his initial apparel designs. During the late 1980s and early 1990s, the brand achieved mainstream domestic commercial success after being featured in the youth-oriented culture publication Olive magazine. This positioned it as a foundational pioneer of the "anti-fashion" philosophy within the emerging Ura-Harajuku streetwear movement alongside contemporary labels like A Bathing Ape and Jun Takahashi's "Undercover" collection.

The Hysteric Glamour storefront sign in Harajuku, Tokyo, featuring the brand's signature "Hysteric Woman" motif.

The brand's core design philosophy functions as a subversive take on traditional Americana and casual ready-to-wear apparel. Its collections heavily feature distressed denim, graphic T-shirts, and leather jackets utilizing the signature "Hysteric Woman" visual motif. Hysteric Glamour expanded its global footprint in 1991 by opening its first international standalone boutique storefront in London, gaining early cross-promotional support from prominent Western alternative rock musicians such as Sonic Youth, Iggy Pop, Courtney Love and Kurt Cobain.

== Aesthetic and design motifs ==
Hysteric Glamour's visual identity is characterized by a maximalist fusion of mid-century Americana mass media, 1970s and 1980s punk rock subcultures, pop art, and retro comic book graphics. Founder Nobuhiko Kitamura intentionally utilized provocative, bold typography, explicit text slogans, and heavy graphic prints to create an anti-commercial style that subverted traditional Japanese fashion norms.

A child's denim skirt found in a secondhand shop, showcasing the brand's signature pop-art graphics and roots in Tokyo thrift subcultures.

A recurring hallmark of the brand is the "Hysteric Woman" graphic—a stylized, retro pin-up silhouette that appears across denim, outerwear, and accessories. Rather than relying on standard clothing production, the brand frequently applies specialized textile distressing techniques, snake-skin screen prints, and heavy knit texturing to mirror the raw, lived-in feel of vintage counterculture apparel.

== Collaborations ==
Hysteric Glamour has partnered with various apparel brands, media franchises, and fine artists to expand its global reach and subcultural presence.

=== Fashion and streetwear ===
Early partnerships began in 1993 with the Andy Warhol Foundation, integrating screen prints into seasonal lines. Collaborations continued with a 2013 Playboy capsule utilizing archival photography, recurring Supreme collections (2017–2024), and a 2022 ASICS/Kiko Kostadinov partnership. Mid-2020s projects featured a Madhappy surf-inspired lounge capsule in April 2025, a December 2025 GDC collaboration, and a 2026 GUESS JEANS denim capsule.

=== Photographic and gallery collaborations ===
The label produced portfolios with artists like Daido Moriyama and Nobuyoshi Araki, culminating in the operation of Tokyo's Rat Hole Gallery from 2008 to July 2020.

== Operations ==
Hysteric Glamour operates as a subsidiary of Ozone Community Co., Ltd., a specialized Japanese fashion conglomerate based in Tokyo. The brand maintains a domestic retail network of approximately 52 directly operated storefronts across Japan, concentrated primarily within prominent commercial and fashion districts in Tokyo, Osaka, and Nagoya.

The brand's multi-level flagship store is located in the Shibuya district of Tokyo, which frequently serves as a hybrid retail installation and alternative art gallery space. Aside from its core adult apparel lines, the brand manages targeted sub-labels to segment its consumer demographics. These include Hysteric XXX, a premium, tailored line emphasizing slim, rock-and-roll-inspired menswear silhouettes, and Joey Hysteric, a dedicated children's apparel line that repurposes the core brand's signature graphics, distressed denims, and counterculture motifs for a youth demographic.

While the brand closed its early international standalone storefronts in London and Paris to centralize domestic execution, its collections maintain selective wholesale distribution through specialized global luxury stockists.

== Legacy ==
Hysteric Glamour is regarded by fashion historians as a pioneering entity within the late 20th-century anti-fashion movement and a foundational blueprint for contemporary global apparel subcultures. Emerging from the creative collective and cultural hub Ozone Community Corporation, the brand allowed founder Nobuhiko Kitamura to bypass traditional corporate apparel structures. By synthesizing mid-century Western mass media motifs with traditional Japanese silhouettes, Kitamura established a distinct visual lexicon that directly informed the stylistic development of the Ura-Harajuku movement during the 1990s.

A typographic resin bracelet from Hysteric Glamour, exemplifying the bold, punk-influenced text layouts central to the brand's design language.

=== Influence ===
In addition to shaping Japanese street subcultures, the brand's early advertising campaigns and editorial visuals—frequently shot by fashion photographer Davide Sorrenti—are cited as critical reference points in the emergence and proliferation of the heroin chic aesthetic within 1990s print media. André-Naquian Wheeler, a writer for i-D, praised the label's distinct visual presentation, highlighting how "its raw, editorial photography captured a profound sense of subcultural authenticity while seamlessly blending Western grunge motifs with Tokyo's emerging street styles."

The label's cross-cultural legitimacy was cemented through landmark, official multimedia partnerships, including licensing apparel with the Andy Warhol Foundation and designing collaborative merchandise for American alternative rock bands like Sonic Youth. The brand achieved further Western mainstream recognition in 2004, when American singer-songwriter Gwen Stefani referenced the label in her single "Harajuku Girls" from the studio album Love. Angel. Music. Baby., noting its exclusive distribution and subcultural status outside of Japan. Reflecting this enduring cultural relevance, archival garments and accessories from the brand's early collections are frequently curated in specialized fashion design retrospectives and remain highly prominent within the premium secondary apparel market.
