= God, Inc. =

- Genre: Comedy, Satire
- Created by: Francis Stokes
- Directed by: Francis Stokes
- Starring: Rachel Oliva; Stephen Falk; Elizabeth Pan; Jeff Sass; Stephanie Jane Markham; Chet Nelson; Dayton Mesher; Rizwan Manji; Amie Farrell; Michael Lutgen
- Country of origin: United States
- Original language: English
- No. of episodes: 6

Production
- Running time: Approx. 5–10 minutes

Original release
- Network: YouTube
- Release: 2006 – 2006

God, Inc. is a six episode long comedy internet video series about the office space of God by the filmmaker Francis Stokes. The premise is that God runs the world through a company with different departments such as disasters, miracles, population control, publicity, customer relations, approvals and product development. It has gathered critical acclaim from a number of media outlets. The creator, Francis Stokes, has said on comments on the sixth episode, that he plans to turn the web series into a TV series. On July 17, 2007, Stokes posted a video onto his YouTube account saying that the Sci Fi Channel has picked up God, Inc.

== Reception ==
God, Inc. received attention from online media following its release in 2006–2007. A review published by Tubefilter described the series as a satirical blend of workplace comedy and theological absurdity, noting its stylistic similarities to The Office and its fast-paced humor.

== Characters ==
- Sarah Melody Church (played by Rachel Oliva) (June 3, 1976 – November 5, 2006) lived in Florida all her life and died of leukemia. She becomes an intern placed in Product Development where she is the only female.
- Austin (played by Stephen Falk) is the last remaining person in the Miracles Department. Changes in staffing within the office have him disillusioned about working there.
- Piper Morris (played by Elizabeth Pan) is the boss and is described as a "hardass". In the first episode, Brad tells Sarah not to "talk to her, or make eye contact".
- Owen (played by Jeff Sass) works in Population Control. He likes his cup o'noodles soup and has a fondness for cancer.
- Paige (played by Stephanie Jane Markham, Francis Stokes' real-life wife) is God's secretary who is not seen frequently because she works upstairs. Paige appears in episode 3, "Who Stole God's Lunch?".
- Keaton (played by Chet Nelson) is the boss of Product Development. He has designed 64 animal species and 217 plant species.
- Gavin (played by Dayton Mesher) works in Product Development. He has designed 28 animal species. It would be 29 but his attempts to submit the porcupotamus as a new animal species keep getting rejected by the Approvals Department.
- Amid (played by Rizwan Manji) is a marketer in the Publicity department who propagates faith in Islam. Riding the contemporary wave of fanaticism and solidarity in the Muslim world, Amid often tops the performance charts in his department. This makes him arrogant, attributing his success to what he calls "the one true marketing strategy".
- Esther (played by Amie Farrell) works in the Publicity department trying to increase the numbers of "Really Christians". She is highly task-focused and will go to the most deviously unchristian lengths to outperform Amid.
- Andy (played by Michael Lutgen) works alongside Esther in Publicity. He is the representative for "Sort-of Christians" and is accordingly indifferent about the faith that he is selling or how he performs in the office.
