= Four Faces of God =

- Directed by: Anthony Hartman
- Written by: Anthony Hartman; Jango Sircus
- Produced by: Jack Gilardi Jr. Dallas Hartman
- Starring: Jaime King; Leon Robinson; Robert LaSardo; William Knight; Mark Rose; Nicholas Stratton
- Cinematography: Michael G. Wojciechowski
- Edited by: Steve Rogers
- Release date: 2002
- Country: United States
- Language: English

Four Faces of God is a 2002 film directed by Anthony Hartman. Written by Hartman and Jango Sircus, the film stars Leon Robinson as Jah, Robert LaSardo as Tony, and Jaime King as Sam.

== Cast ==
- Leon Robinson as Jah
- Robert LaSardo as Tony
- Jaime King as Sam
- William Knight as Father Pecato
- Marc Rose as Joey
- Nicholas Stratton as Altar Boy
