= Code Name Banshee =

- Directed by: Jon Keeyes
- Written by: Matthew Rogers
- Produced by: Jordan Beckerman; Jon Keeyes; Jordan Yale Levine; Shaun Sanghani
- Starring: Jaime King; Antonio Banderas; Tommy Flanagan
- Cinematography: Austin F. Schmidt
- Edited by: R.J. Cooper
- Music by: Ben Weinman
- Production companies: Yale Productions; Banshee Productions; Bee-Hive Productions; Highland Myst Entertainment; Lucky 13 Productions; SSS Film Capital
- Distributed by: Screen Media
- Release date: July 1, 2022
- Running time: 93 minutes
- Country: United States
- Language: English

Code Name Banshee is a 2022 American action film directed by Jon Keeyes, starring Jaime King, Antonio Banderas and Tommy Flanagan.

== Cast ==
- Jaime King as Delilah
- Antonio Banderas as Caleb
- Tommy Flanagan as Anthony Greene
- Catherine Davis as Haley
- Aleksander Vayshelboym as Kronos
- Dylan Flashner as Ryker
- Dina Plotch as Tasha
- Colin Walker as Jeremy
- Rose Lane Sanfilippo as Malia
- Victor Plajas as Bishop
- Wayne Pyle as Rick
- John Wollman as Mave
- Emily Tung as Robyn
- Nic Coccaro as J.T.
- Keil Oakley Zepernick as Giant
- Kim DeLonghi as Carla

== Release ==
The film was released in theatres and on demand on 1 July 2022.

== Reception ==
Brent Simon of The A.V. Club wrote, "In the end, Code Name Banshee doesn’t have interesting ideas about who its characters are, or even wish to be. It’s a cliché-driven, rinse-and-repeat exercise in expended bullets, nothing more."

Jeffrey Anderson of Common Sense Media rated the film 2 stars out of 5 and wrote that "While it's great to see King confident in a straight-up warrior role, there's so little actually going on in this flat action movie that it feels like the warmup act for a much better movie."

Alex Saveliev of Film Threat gave the film a score of 4/10 wrote, "The feature is haphazardly edited, with the shot-from-afar fight scenes particularly egregious, clearly revealing stunt doubles. Everything is immersed in murky browns and washed-out grays; the film is so devoid of color that it’s almost black-and-white. The by-the-numbers script by Matthew Rogers careens along, every so-called twist and turn predictable. No flair or creativity seems to have been applied to any of it."
