= As1one =

Male pop group from Israel

as1one
- Origin: Israel
- Genre: Pop
- Label: AWAL/Sony Music Entertainment
- Members: Nadav Philips; Niv Lin; Aseel Farah; Ohad Attia; Sadik Dogosh; Neta Rozenblat
- Website: as1one.com

as1one (pronounced "as one") is a pop group made up of mixed Israeli Jewish and Palestinian Arab members.

== History ==
as1one was conceived and formed by music entrepreneurs James Diener, who signed and developed Maroon 5, and Ken Levitan, who signed and developed Kings Of Leon. Beginning in 2021, the pair held auditions across cities and small villages in Israel. After thousands of auditions, they would eventually land on a six-member vocal and multi-instrumentalist group comprising Nadav Philips, Niv Lin, Aseel Farah, Ohad Attia, Sadik Dogosh and Neta Rozenblat, who would sing their music in English. The group members come from various backgrounds, encompassing the Christian, Jewish, and Muslim faiths. as1one had been in the works for multiple years, dating back before the COVID-19 pandemic.

In August 2023, as1one traveled to London to record at Abbey Road Studios with Nile Rodgers. The group would later relocate to Los Angeles to continue recording their debut music, flying out on October 5, just prior to the outbreak of the Gaza war. Neta Rozenblat said in an interview that the band members "have all lost people in this war" and that "it is really tough to see innocent people dragged into this on both sides." In the same interview, Sadik Dogosh voiced concerns about the band being forced into an "ambassador role" when they are just musicians and not politicians. Since the group's arrival in America, as1one has collaborated with multiple producers and songwriters, including Jenna Andrews and Stephen Kirk, Jason Evigan, Oak Felder, Tommy Brown, Justin Tranter, Lil' Aaron, Danja and Y2K.

On September 13, 2024, it was announced that as1one had signed with the label Thirty Tigers distributed through The Orchard. They also released their first single, "All Eyes on Us" (featuring Nile Rodgers). Some listeners criticized the song and the band's branding as disconnected from reality, with regards to the ongoing Israeli invasion of the Gaza Strip. Some users highlighted the similarity of "All Eyes on Us" to "All Eyes on Rafah", the viral slogan in reference to Israel's Rafah offensive, and accused the song of drawing attention away from the conflict. Other users defended the band and said they were free to express themselves how they wished.

In 2025, they went on a tour to multiple schools across the UK to speak about mental health.

The story of as1one is the subject of a 4-part docu-series now on Paramount+.
