= Harold Buttleman, Daredevil Stuntman =

- Directed by: Francis Stokes
- Written by: Francis Stokes
- Starring: John Hawkes; Karen Black; Dan Castellaneta; Ryan Alosio
- Release date: 2003
- Country: United States
- Language: English

Harold Buttleman, Daredevil Stuntman (also known as Buttleman) is a 2003 film written and directed by Francis Stokes; the only movie he has directed. It won the Jury Prize at the Deep Ellum Film Festival in 2003. It was awarded the audience award in the Had to Be Made Film Festival in 2005.

The film is a comedy about a small town tuxedo salesman who thinks he's the next Evel Knievel, a renowned American stunt man. It stars John Hawkes as Harold Buttleman, and co-stars Karen Black and Dan Castellaneta.

Francis Stokes released the film in its entirety on Video on YouTube on July 26, 2007, making it the second feature film to be released on the platform after Four-Eyed Monsters in the same year. Its runtime is 94 minutes.

This film features music from Splitsville's album The Complete Pet Soul.
