= The Pardon =

- Directed by: Tom Anton
- Written by: Tom Anton; Sandi Russell
- Produced by: Tom Anton; Blair Daily; Jacqueline George; Sandi Russell
- Starring: Jaime King; Jason Lewis; John Hawkes; T. J. Thyne; M. C. Gainey; Tim Guinee; Leigh Whannell; Ed Bruce; Brandon Smith; Larry Black
- Cinematography: Matthew Irving
- Distributed by: Monterey Media (US)
- Release date: March 22, 2013
- Running time: 114 minutes
- Country: United States
- Language: English

The Pardon is a 2013 drama film directed by Tom Anton. Filmed in Shreveport, Louisiana, it stars Jaime King as Toni Jo Henry, a woman who overcomes a tragic beginning but was executed for murder, and John Hawkes as "Arkie" Burke, Henry's partner in the crime.

The picture is based on an actual case tried in Louisiana in the 1940s. Adapted from the true crime book Stone Justice by Evelyn L. Morgan and Debi King McMartin.

== Plot ==
With all the picturesque glamour of the 1940s, The Pardon recounts the unlikely true story of Toni Jo Henry (Jaime King), a woman tried three times and executed in Louisiana, 1942.

Surviving a legacy of childhood abuse, which lands her in the art deco brothels of the time, Toni Jo briefly discovers love and happiness when she marries the dashing boxer Cowboy Henry (Jason Lewis). Cowboy is soon after sent to prison, leaving the bereft Toni Jo to embark on an ill-fated mission with Cowboy's sometime partner Arkie (John Hawkes). A grisly murder and a series of sensational trials where she pleads her innocence instantly makes the beautiful Toni Jo into a celebrity. Facing conviction after conviction, will she find true redemption in the face of the crimes for which she is accused?

== Cast ==
- Jaime King as Toni Jo Henry
- Jason Lewis as Claude "Cowboy" Henry
- M. C. Gainey as Gibbs Duhon
- Leigh Whannell as Clement Moss
- John Hawkes as Finnon "Arkie" Burke
- T. J. Thyne as Father Richard
- Tim Guinee as Norman Anderson
- Niki Spiridakos as Niki
- Brad Dison as a Reporter
- Stuart Greer as George McQuiston
- Ed Bruce as J. P. Copeland
- Kip Cummings as Deputy Sheriff
- Nancy Ellen Mills as Mrs Calloway
- Celeste Roberts as Aunt Emma
- Jeddah Danielle Salera as Young Toni Jo Henry
- Jim Dickson as prison guard
