= James Diener =

American music industry executive

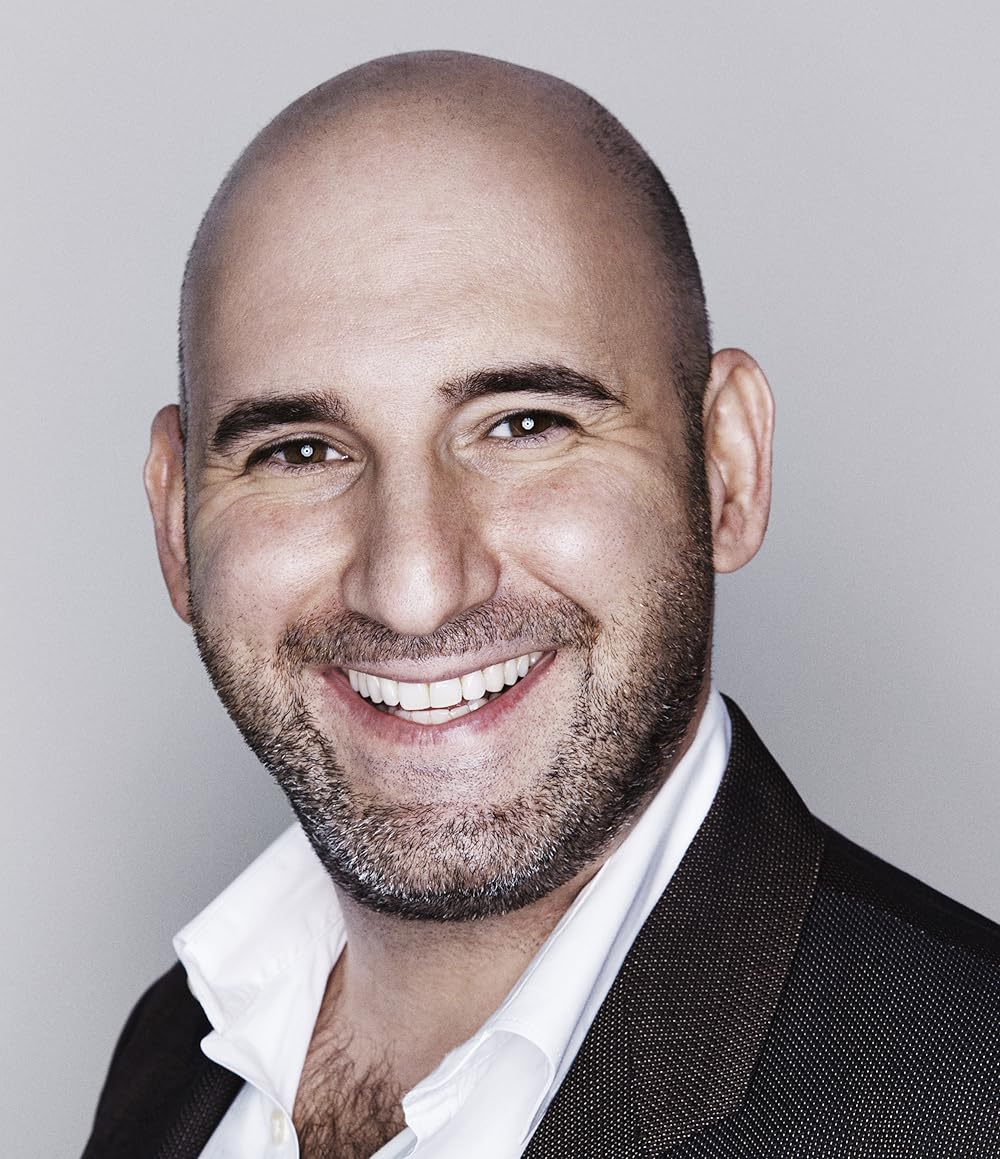
- Education: Johns Hopkins University
- Occupations: Entertainment and music executive

James Diener is an American entertainment and music executive.

He is the co-founder of Freesolo Entertainment, an entertainment company consisting of Freesolo Music, a record label joint venture with Interscope Records/Universal Music Group; Freesolo Publishing, a joint venture with Sony/ATV Music Publishing, Freesolo Management, and a joint venture with Vector Management. Freesolo has represented artists such as Avril Lavigne, Gavin DeGraw, The Struts, Jazmin Bean, Hailee Steinfeld, Jharrel Jerome, Rachel Platten, and Pitbull.

He was the founder, CEO, and President of A&M Octone Records, which signed and developed platinum artists including Maroon 5, K'naan Hollywood Undead and Flyleaf.

Diener conceived and formed, as1one, the first mixed Israeli Palestinian pop group. as1one is the subject of a 2024 Paramount+ 4-part docuseries, for which he is also Executive Producer.

He was the co-founder of Alignment Artist Capital, a New York–based specialty finance company created specifically for the entertainment industry in partnership with BlackRock.

He was the Executive Music Producer for Netflix's 2018 unscripted music series Westside.

== Early life ==
Diener grew up in New York and attended The Fieldston School. His father, Steve Diener, was the president of ABC Records in the 1970s. He attended Johns Hopkins University and graduated in 1991 with honors.

== Career ==
Diener was the founder, CEO, and President of A&M Octone Records, a joint venture between Octone Records and Universal Music Group. A&M/Octone Records signed and developed platinum artists including Maroon 5, Hollywood Undead, Flyleaf and K'naan. After six years of operation, in September 2013, Octone initiated its buy/sell rights in the joint venture, resulting in Universal Music Group purchasing Octone Records' 50% interest in A&M Octone Records.

In 2000, Diener founded Octone Records, while simultaneously serving as Senior Vice President of A&R Marketing for Clive Davis and the RCA Music Group. As part of that relationship, Diener negotiated a joint venture with Sony Music that gave Octone the ability to upstream successful acts in partnership with the RCA Music Group for further international marketing and promotion. While at RCA, Diener signed and developed singer-songwriter Gavin DeGraw.

Octone was also noted in the music industry for its private-equity financing model and is the subject of a 2007 Harvard Business School case study. Upon Octone's original launch, Diener raised $5 million of private equity investment from BlackRock, The Blackstone Group, Lazard Freres, Credit Suisse First Boston, MacAndrews & Forbes, Kelso & Company and Soros Fund Management.

Prior to Octone Records and RCA Music Group, Diener was Vice President of A&R and Marketing at Columbia Records, working with Aerosmith, Bruce Springsteen, Bob Dylan, Pink Floyd, Johnny Cash, Roger Waters, Black Crowes, New Kids On The Block, Iron Maiden, The Jayhawks, Tony Bennett, Jesse Malin, D Generation, Clutch, Chris Whitley and Terence Trent D'Arby, among others.

Diener is a record producer and member of both NARAS and the Academy of Magical Arts.

He has been an invited guest speaker at New York University, Harvard Business School, Wharton School of Business, Berklee College of Music, and the Benjamin N. Cordoza School of Law. Diener was also featured in Blockbusters, a 2013 book on the business of entertainment and a 2002 New York Times Magazine cover story on the pop music industry. He delivered the Keynote Speech at the 2010 NARM Convention in Chicago.
