= Scouted =

- The cast of Scouted
- Genre: Reality television
- Country of origin: United States
- Original language: English
- No. of seasons: 1
- No. of episodes: 8

Production
- Running time: 42 minutes
- Production company: 51 Minds Entertainment

Original release
- Network: E!
- Release: November 28, 2011 – January 16, 2012

Scouted is an American reality television series that chronicles the discovery process of the next big name in the modeling industry. The show premiered on Monday, November 28, 2011, on the E! cable network.

== Overview ==
The series showcases local model scouts Page Parkes (Houston, TX), Stacie Vanchieri (Richmond, VA), Erin Olson (Salt Lake City, UT), and Kristen Kotik (San Francisco, CA) as they try to discover the next big name. The scouts will train the aspiring models and then introduce them to the One Management modeling agency. Then, industry veterans Michael Flutie, Julia Samersova, Beri Smither, and Dani Stahl will evaluate the potential of the models. This process includes a trip to the legendary fashion closet, as well as an intimidating photo shoot with Photographer and Director Danny Christensen. Ultimately, Scott Lipps, president of One Management, will decide whether or not to sign the models to his agency.

== Production ==
E! ordered 8 episodes for the first season. Angela Aguilera, Ben Samek, Cris Abrego, Michael Flutie, and Rabih Gholam serve as executive producers. Danny Christensen manages Fashion Photography and Direction, using RED Epic and with support by B2Pro.

== Episodes ==
| Episode | U.S. Air Date | Rating/Share (18-49) | Viewers (Millions) |
|---|---|---|---|
| "Gillian & Jennifer" | November 28, 2011 | 0.4 | 0.73 |
| "Valenteen & Kelsie" | December 5, 2011 | 0.3 | 0.52 |
| "Nicole & Amber" | December 12, 2011 | | |
| "Amy & Jillian" | December 19, 2011 | | |
| "Cheyann & Gina" | December 26, 2011 | | |
| "Lindsay & Amber R." | January 2, 2012 | 0.2 | 0.46 |
| "Marissa and Hallie" | January 9, 2012 | 0.2 | 0.42 |
| "Erin and Alwyn" | January 16, 2012 | 0.3 | 0.57 |
