= Eve's Necklace =

- Film poster
- Directed by: Daniel Erickson
- Written by: Daniel Erickson
- Produced by: Daniel Erickson
- Starring: John Hawkes
- Cinematography: Daniel Erickson
- Edited by: Daniel Erickson
- Release date: July 2010 (Fantasia)
- Running time: 80 minutes
- Country: United States
- Language: English

Eve's Necklace is a 2010 American thriller film written and directed by Daniel Erickson and featuring the voice of John Hawkes. The film uses mannequins as the actors.

== Premise ==
A deadly threat in the present and a dark secret from the past imperil a young couple in this first-ever motion picture with an all-mannequin cast.

== Cast ==
- Veronica Erickson as Eva
- John Hawkes as William
- Janet Hurley Kimlicko as The Waitress / Radio Host
- Zane Rockenbaugh as Thief
- Kevin Simon as Ramon
- Johnny Coleman Walker as Jeremy
- Cyndi Williams as Janis
