= Bedazzled (2000 film) =

2000 film by Harold Ramis

- Theatrical release poster
- Directed by: Harold Ramis
- Screenplay by: Larry Gelbart; Harold Ramis; Peter Tolan
- Based on: Bedazzled by Peter Cook & Dudley Moore
- Produced by: Trevor Albert; Harold Ramis
- Starring: Brendan Fraser; Elizabeth Hurley; Frances O'Connor
- Cinematography: Bill Pope
- Edited by: Craig Herring
- Music by: David Newman
- Production company: Regency Enterprises
- Distributed by: 20th Century Fox
- Release dates: October 20, 2000 (United States); January 18, 2001 (Germany)
- Running time: 93 minutes
- Countries: United States; Germany
- Language: English
- Budget: $48 million
- Box office: $90.3 million

Bedazzled is a 2000 fantasy romantic comedy film directed by Harold Ramis and starring Brendan Fraser and Elizabeth Hurley. It is a remake of the 1967 British film of the same name, written by Peter Cook and Dudley Moore, itself a comic retelling of the Faust legend. It follows a computer company worker (Fraser) who makes a deal with the Devil (Hurley) to receive seven wishes in exchange for his soul so he can pursue the woman he loves, though the Devil twists the spirit of each wish to frustrate him.

Bedazzled was released by 20th Century Fox on October 20, 2000 in the United States and on January 18, 2001 in Germany. The film received mixed reviews from critics and grossed $90.3 million against a $48 million budget.

== Plot ==
The Devil runs a computer simulation to analyze souls to determine individual weaknesses to exploit. The program settles on Elliot Richards, a sweet, geeky, over-zealous man working a dead-end job in a San Francisco computer company. He has no friends, and his co-workers avoid him. He harbours a crush on his colleague, Alison Gardner, but lacks the courage to ask her out. When Elliot finally musters the courage to approach Alison at a bar, she fails to recognize him; as his co-workers laugh at his embarrassment, Alison slips away. Frustrated, Elliot says he would give anything for her to be with him.

The Devil, in the form of a seductive, gorgeous woman, overhears him and offers to give Elliot seven wishes in exchange for his soul.

As a test, Elliot wishes for a Big Mac and a large Coke. The Devil takes him to McDonald's and places the order. Elliot has to pay for it, because the Devil left her purse in the Underworld. After taking Elliot to her office, based at a nightclub in Oakland, the Devil convinces Elliot to sign her contract, and delivers further wishes. Each wish has Elliot living them out with Alison and his co-workers in surrogate roles. However, the Devil always spoils his wishes by adding something he does not expect or want.

After going through five wishes, Elliot is arrested after confessing his story to a priest who believed he was drunk. The Devil, dressed as a police officer, throws him in a cell, telling him that she likes him, and it would not hurt to have her as a friend. Elliot's friendly cellmate tells him that he cannot sell his soul as it belongs to God, and although the Devil may try to confuse him, in the end he will realize who he truly is, and what his purpose is. Elliot questions the man as to his identity, but the response is simply "a really good friend".

Elliot asks the Devil to cancel their contract. When the Devil refuses, Elliot states he will not use his final wish. The Devil teleports them to Hell. When the Devil pushes him to make a final wish, Elliot wishes that Alison could have a happy life – with or without him. The Devil sighs and Elliot falls into the depths of Hell. He wakes up on a marble staircase, wondering if it is Heaven. The Devil tells him that a provision in the contract's fine print states that a selfless wish voids the contract. Elliot admits that despite her manipulation of him he has come to like the Devil and regards her as a friend. She advises that Heaven and Hell can be found on Earth - it's up to humans to choose.

The next day, one of his co-workers mockingly asks Elliot if he wants to hang out after work but Elliot grabs him by the shirt, says, "Nice talking to you", and lets him go, while staring down at the other co-workers that were in on it. With newfound confidence, Elliot asks Alison out, but discovers she is already dating another man. He wishes her well and continues with his life, with a better understanding of who he is.

At home, he meets a new neighbor, Nicole Delarusso, who has an uncanny resemblance to Alison, but her personality, interests, and fashion sense are much more similar to his. He offers to help her unpack and they begin a relationship. While the two walk along the street, the Devil and Elliot's cellmate, both dressed in white, are observing them while playing chess. The Devil's computer program highlights Elliot and Nicole's minor foibles, but the two happily accept each other as they are.

== Cast ==
- Brendan Fraser as
  - Elliot Richards
  - Abraham Lincoln
- Elizabeth Hurley as the Devil
- Frances O'Connor as Alison Gardner / Nicole Delarusso
- Orlando Jones as
  - Daniel / Dan / Danny
  - Esteban
  - Beach Jock
  - Lamar Garrett (Sportscaster)
  - Dr. Ngegitigegitibaba (African Party Guest)
- Paul Adelstein as
  - Bob Bob
  - Roberto
  - Beach Jock
  - Sportscaster
  - Lincoln Aide
- Toby Huss as
  - Jerry
  - Alejandro
  - Beach Jock
  - Jerry Turner (Sportcaster)
  - Lance
- Miriam Shor as
  - Carol
  - Penthouse Hostess
- Gabriel Casseus as Elliot's cellmate
- Brian Doyle-Murray as Priest
- Jeff Doucette as Desk Sergeant
- Aaron Lustig as Synedyne supervisor
- Rudolf Martin as Raoul
- Julian Firth as John Wilkes Booth

== Production ==
In April 1997, it was reported that Harold Ramis would write, direct, and co-produce a remake of the 1967 film Bedazzled for 20th Century Fox with the approval of the original film's director Stanley Donen, who jointly owned the rights with Fox. In January 1998, Larry Gelbart joined to co-write the script, which, unlike the original film, would feature a female Devil. In November 1999, it was reported that Brendan Fraser dropped out of The Wedding Planner to play the lead role in Bedazzled for $10 million, with Fox enthusiastic on working with Fraser again after Monkeybone. In January 2000, Elizabeth Hurley and Frances O'Connor joined the film as co-stars.

== Release ==
=== Home media ===
In the United States, Bedazzled was released on DVD and VHS on March 13, 2001, by 20th Century Fox Home Entertainment. The DVD version of the film is THX certified and features Nuon technology, which can only be used on Nuon-enhanced DVD players. These Nuon features include viddies, hyper slides and various zoom points during the film. There are four different main menus themed to rich, famous, intelligent and sensitive. Bonus features on the DVD are extended scenes, an audio commentary, an HBO special, The Making of Bedazzled, behind-the-scenes footage, theatrical trailers, TV spots, galleries, Bedazzling designs, scoring sessions and more.

== Reception ==
=== Box office ===
Bedazzled did reasonably well at the box office. It topped British box office sales ahead of What Lies Beneath and Pitch Black when it debuted in the UK during the weekend of 10 November 2000, and finished at #2 on its American opening weekend behind the surprise smash hit Meet the Parents.

=== Critical response ===
The film received mixed reviews from critics. Hurley's performance was praised, but her attendance at its premiere was met with backlash from the Screen Actors Guild because it occurred during a strike it was holding. On Rotten Tomatoes, the film has an approval rating of 50% based on 116 reviews, with an average of 5.5/10. The site's general consensus states, "Though it has its funny moments, this remake is essentially a one joke movie with too many flat plots, and not a patch on the superior original." On Metacritic, the film has a score of 49 out of 100 based on reviews from 34 critics, indicating "mixed or average" reviews.

Michael Wilmington of the Chicago Tribune wrote, disappointedly, that "'Bedazzled' recycled is not the finest hour for Fraser or Hurley—though Fraser, Elliot Richards in this movie, comes closer. It isn't Ramis' finest hour either—though he's one American moviemaker who excels at concept comedies, as he's proved in Groundhog Day, and the best parts of the crude and lewd Caddyshack. Bedazzled, one of the best comic premises ever, should have been duck soup to him." Wilmington's rival, the Chicago Sun-Times' Roger Ebert, commented that "the new movie has been directed by Harold Ramis from a screenplay that uses the 1967 film more as inspiration than source. It is lacking in wickedness. It doesn't smack its lips when it's naughty. When its hero sells his soul to the devil, what results isn't diabolical effrontery, but a series of contract negotiations and consumer complaints. This is twice in two weeks (after the Winona Ryder exorcism movie Lost Souls) that Satan loses on points." The Los Angeles Times' Kenneth Turan stated that "as written by Larry Gelbart, director Harold Ramis and Peter Tolan, this 'Bedazzled,' though amusing from moment to moment, is erratic, unfocused and uncertain where it's going. And whenever it gets too insecure about itself, the film falls back, in classic the-devil-made-me-do-it Hollywood fashion, on explosions, gunfights, helicopter stunts, car crashes and computer-generated effects. What should be a drawing-room comedy ends with moments best left to Gone in 60 Seconds."

=== Accolades ===
Bedazzled received nominations from the Make-Up Artists & Hair Stylists Guild in 2001 for both the Best Contemporary Make-Up in a Feature-Length Motion Picture and Best Contemporary Hair Styling in a Feature-Length Motion Picture awards. Hurley received a nomination for the 2001 MTV Movie Awards in the Best Dressed category, losing to Jennifer Lopez in The Cell.

The trailer for Bedazzled was nominated for and won the Saul Bass Award for Best Title Sequence at the 2001 Golden Trailer Awards.
