= Davide Sorrenti =

Italian fashion photographer (1976–1997)

- Born: July 9, 1976; Naples, Italy
- Died: February 4, 1997 (aged 20)
- Occupation: Photographer
- Years active: 1995–1997
- Relatives: Mario Sorrenti (brother)

Davide Sorrenti (July 9, 1976 – February 4, 1997) was an Italian-American photographer, born into the prominent fashion photography Sorrenti family. He is best remembered for his involvement in the rise and fall of the Heroin chic fashion trend of the 1990s.

== Early life and education ==
Davide Sorrenti was born in 1976 in Naples in a family of photographers.

The Sorrentis moved to New York in January 1982, partly because Davide had thalassemia (or Cooley's anemia, a hereditary form of anemia), and needed regular blood transfusions and medical care. The disease made him look several years younger than his real age. His brother Mario documented his sufferings one of many nights, published in the book The Machine, titled for the drug infusion pump that Davide was hooked up to.

Sorrenti attended Bayard Rustin High School for the Humanities, with fellow skateboarders and graffiti artists. His tag was Argue (SKE) with whom he formed a rap group called The Mosaics, because of their wide mix of ethnicities; he also started the streetwear label Danücht.

== Career ==
Sorrenti shot for magazines such as Interview, Ray Gun, i-D, Detour, Independent, Surface and Dune. He shot for fashion brands such as Hugo Boss, Bergdorf Goodman, Supreme, Hysteric Glamour and Zoo York. He also worked with Kaws, Kate Moss, Milla Jovovich and Jaime King. Sorrenti founded the fashion brand Danücht, which is best known for its anti-commercial "MODELS SUCK" t-shirt worn by English model Naomi Campbell in the 1996 film Girl 6.

In a series of snapshots published in Interview in 1996, Sorrenti's friends from SKE (See Know Evil) are portrayed hanging out in a run-down apartment, watching TV and using drugs. One of Sorrenti's photos shows a young Jaime King lying on a bed, with torn clothes surrounded with photos of Kurt Cobain, Sid Vicious, and Jerry Garcia of the Grateful Dead.

Sorrenti died on February 4, 1997. He had been on holidays in Mexico prior to his death and had missed a blood transfusion. There were drugs in his system, but they were not lethal. According to his mother, "Davide was born with a blood disorder [...] he did not die of a heroin overdose. He died because he used drugs and his body couldn't take it."

== Legacy ==
As a reaction to her son's death, Francesca Sorrenti started a campaign against the glamourization of drug addiction and underage models, demanding magazine editors to take responsibility. She was more upset with the fact that the models were starting to get addicted to drugs, and no one was saying anything about it. "Heroin chic isn't what we're projecting. It's what we are. Our business has become heroin chic. Someone taking pictures of that magnitude has to have experienced hard drugs", Ms. Sorrenti stated in The New York Times. President Bill Clinton mentioned his death, saying "But the glorification of heroin is not creative, it's destructive, [...] It's not beautiful; it's ugly. And this is not about art; it's about life and death. And glorifying death is not good for any society", referring to the heroin chic fashion trend.

In November 2018 filmmaker Charles Curran released a documentary film called See Know Evil on the life, work and death of Sorrenti. Eye For Film said that "[The] film is partly about telling the story of his life, partly about trying to present a balanced reappraisal of his work." In the film, discussion of Davide's work is intertwined with discussion of his friends and youthful exploits.

In November 2019 Francesca Sorrenti, David's mother, released Davide Sorrenti ArgueSKE 1994–1997, a retrospective of his work.
