= Clara Phillips =

US showgirl and chorus girl convicted of murder (1898–1969)

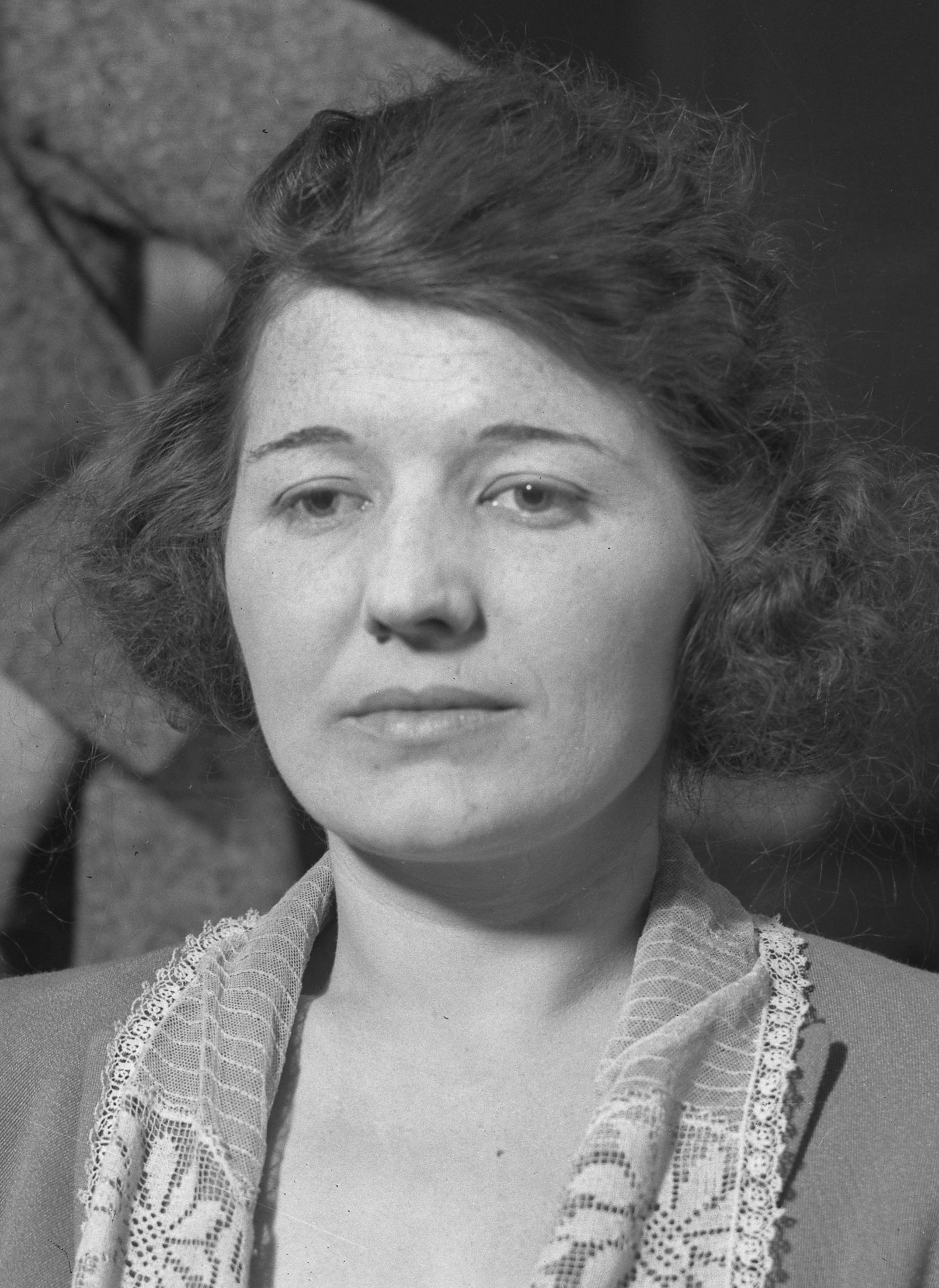
- Phillips in 1922
- Born: June 23, 1894; Waco, Texas, U.S.
- Died: 21 June 1969
- Other names: Tiger Woman; Mrs. R. H. Young; Mrs. Jesse Carlson
- Occupations: Showgirl; chorus girl; movie extra
- Years active: 1915–1922
- Spouse: Armour L. Phillips (m. 1918; div. 1934)
- Motive: Jealousy over rumors of infidelity of husband
- Conviction: Guilty of second-degree murder
- Escaped: December 5, 1922
- Escape end: April 23, 1923

Details
- Victims: Alberta Meadows
- Location: Montecito Heights, Los Angeles
- Weapon: Hammer
- Date apprehended: July 14, 1922

Clara Phillips (born Clara Anne Weaver, June 23, 1894 – 21 June 1969), nicknamed the Tiger Woman, was an American showgirl and chorus girl who, in 1922, murdered 19-year-old bank teller Alberta Meadows based on rumors that her husband, Armour L. Phillips, had been having an affair with her. Phillips' crime was described as "brutal" and "remorseless" by many local and national news organizations, which extensively covered her trial, subsequent escape from prison, and recapture.

== Early life and career ==
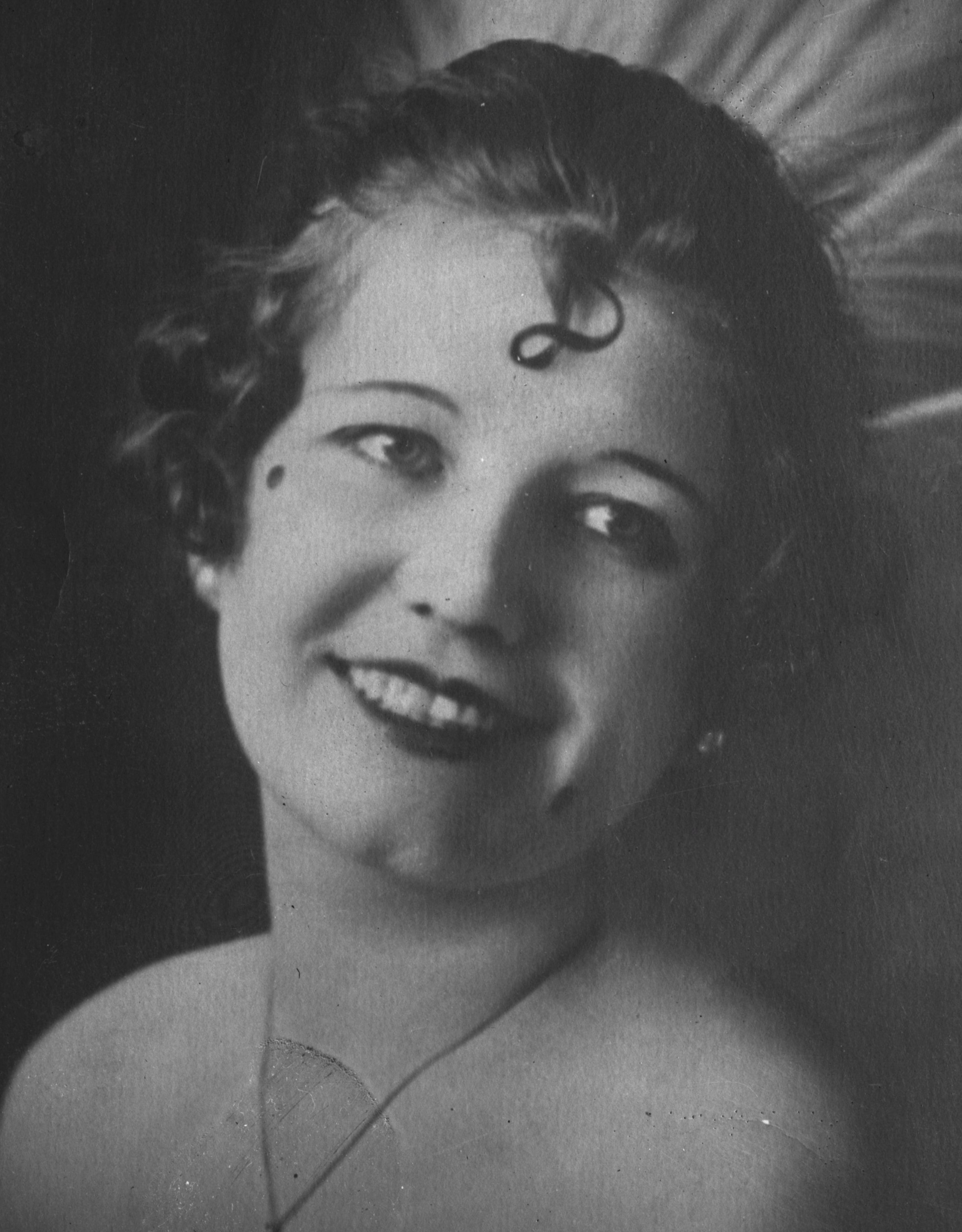
Phillips as a chorus girl

Clara Anne Weaver was born on June 23, 1894, in Waco, Texas, as one of five children to John Weaver and Anna Jackson. Throughout her childhood, her family moved frequently around Texas, finally settling in Houston when she was a teenager. There she met Armour Phillips, a relative of the Mellon family. The couple married on May 14th, 1918.

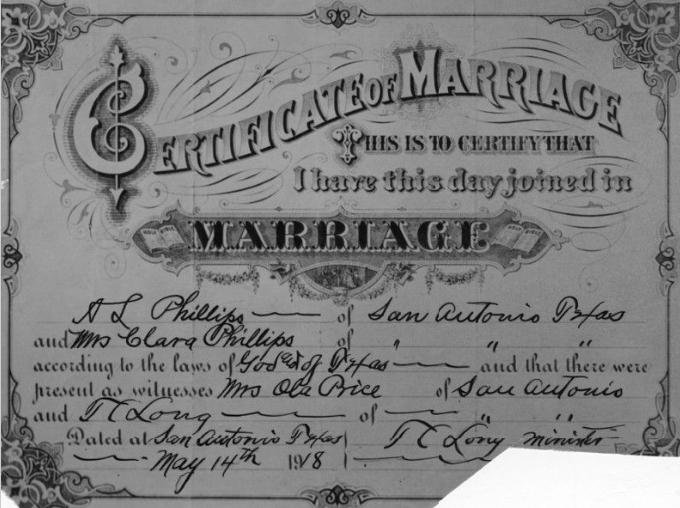
Clara Weaver Phillips and Armour Lee Phillips' Marriage Certificate with Clara's sister Mrs.Ola Price as witness. San Antonio, Texas, May 14, 1918

Because of their desired careers – Armour sought work in the oil industry, while Weaver wanted to become an actress – the couple moved to the Vermont Square neighborhood of Los Angeles, California. Phillips was relatively successful in her acting career, working as a chorus girl at the Pantages Theatre in Hollywood and as a model for Mack Sennett in one of his Sennett Bathing Beauties works.

Although both had luxury, Phillips' schedule conflicted with Armour's lifestyle. She soon quit her job to spend her time with him, though he started to spend his time elsewhere. Because of this, neighbors started rumors that he was seeing a younger girl named Alberta Gibson Tremaine Meadows, a 19-year-old bank teller and widow. Phillips investigated the rumors by quietly stalking both Armour and Meadows. She followed Armour to First National Bank, at which Meadows worked, which led her to assume the rumors were true.

== Crime ==
=== Murder ===
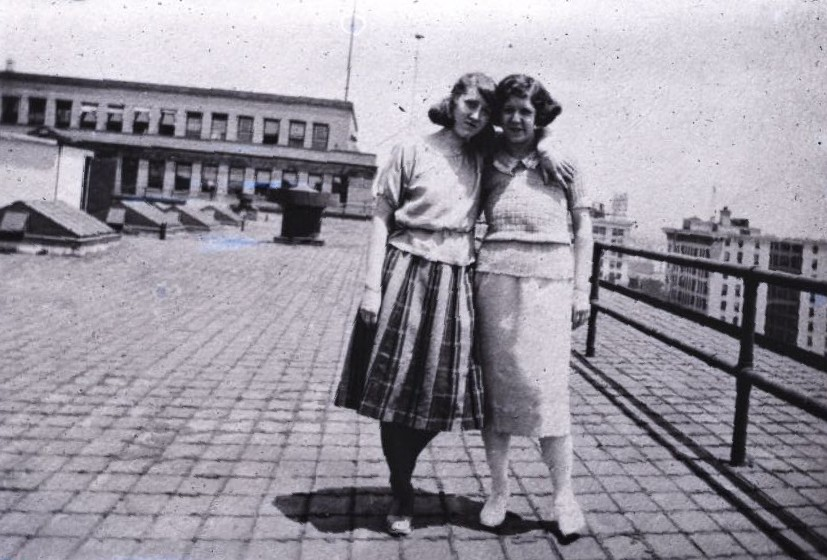
Alberta Tremaine Meadows (right) and her younger sister Genora (left), 1922

On July 10, 1922, Phillips went to a five-and-dime store and purchased a 15-cent claw hammer. She asked a store employee if it could kill a woman, to which the clerk, assuming she was joking, replied that it could. The next day, Phillips, accompanied by friend and fellow showgirl Peggy Caffee, broke into Meadows' home to find that she was not there. They then went to her workplace at First National Bank, where Phillips, claiming to be drunk, asked Meadows to drive them to Montecito Heights. Once there, Phillips interrogated Meadows on the affair, which Meadows denied. Phillips then beat her with the hammer and rolled a 50-pound boulder onto her body before driving home. Caffee, terrified after witnessing the murder, initially kept quiet.

=== Search and arrest ===
When she arrived home, still drenched in Alberta's blood, Phillips informed Armour about the murder and told him that she was going to cook him the "best dinner he'd ever had because she was so happy." Armour was repulsed, but still helped Phillips get rid of evidence and leave Los Angeles. The following morning, after sending Phillips away on a train to El Paso, Texas, he consulted his lawyer and informed Los Angeles police about the murder. Investigators who found Meadows' body likened her injuries to a tiger attack, leading the press to dub Phillips as the "Tiger Woman". On July 14, Phillips was apprehended in Tucson, Arizona.

=== Trial ===
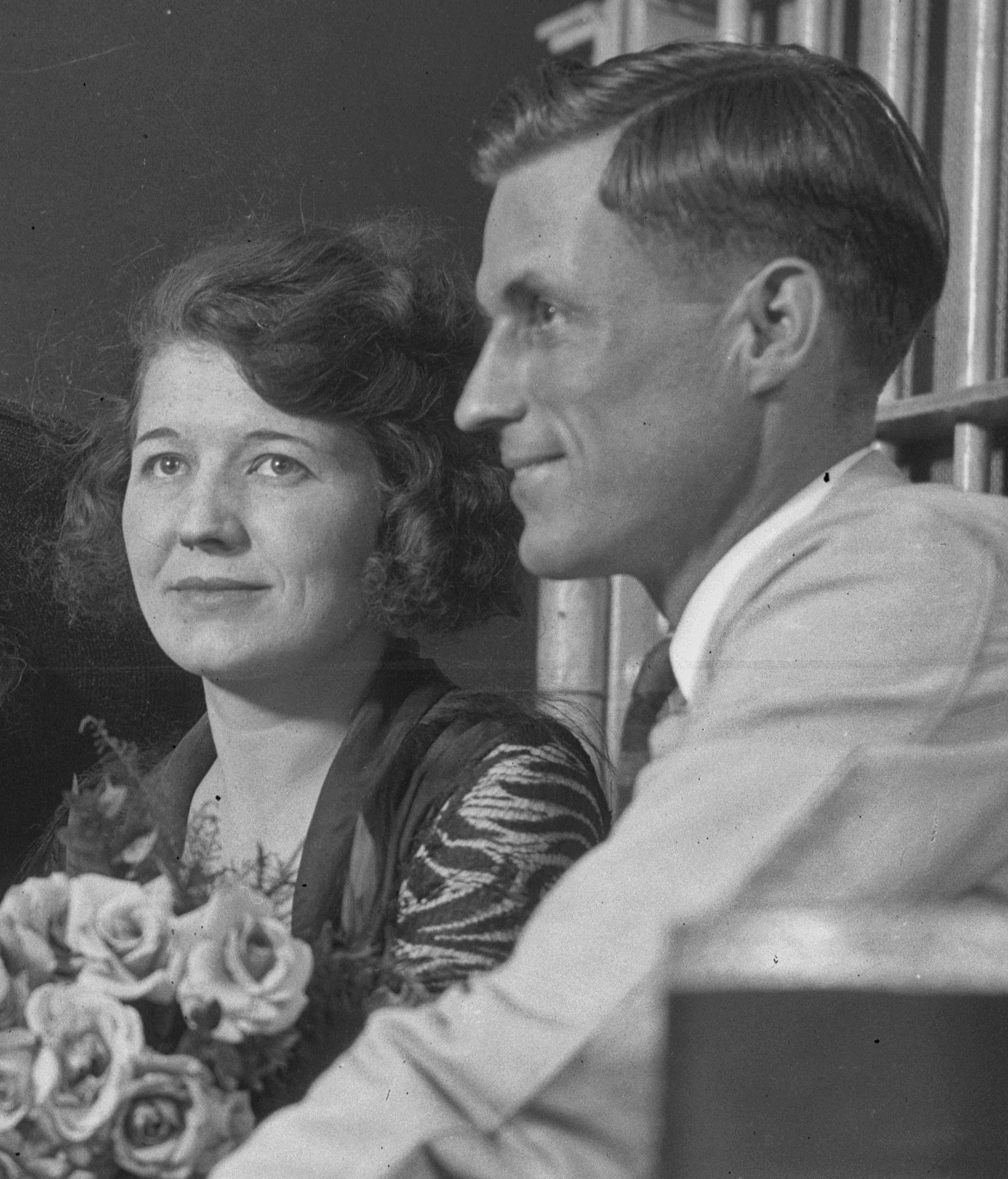
Armour and Clara during trial in 1922

Phillips stayed silent on the murder as the trial neared. On September 17, 1922, Phillips stood for trial. Armour hired attorney Bert Herrington to handle his wife's defense, while the prosecution was led by Charles Fricke. Caffee testified during the hearing about how Phillips murdered Meadows, while Phillips instead implicated Caffee in the murder. On November 16, 1922, Phillips was convicted of second-degree murder and was sentenced to ten years to life; she had been saved from the death penalty by her looks, according to some members of the jury.

=== Escape and recapture ===
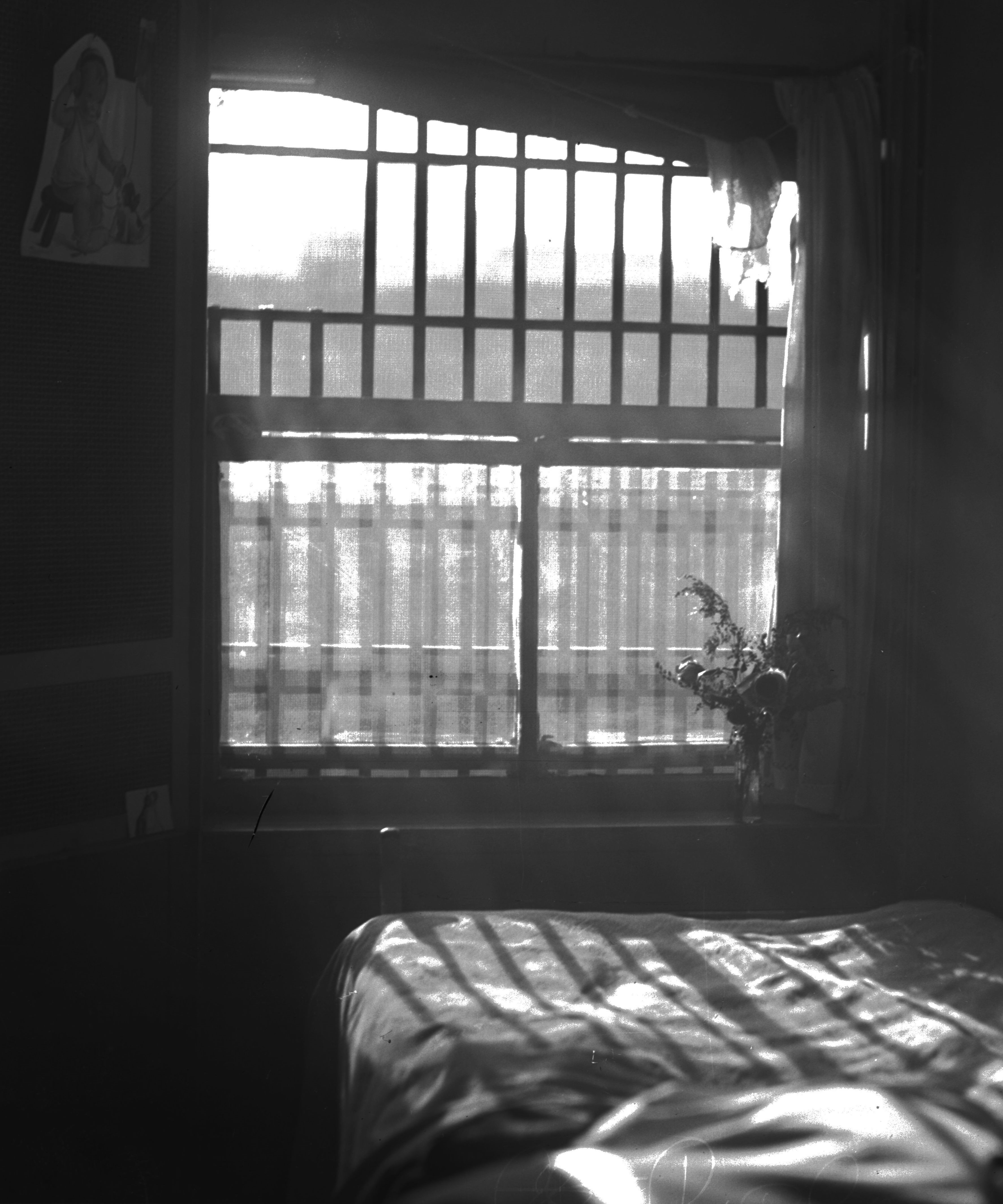
The jail cell of Clara Phillips after her escape

On December 5, 1922, a jail matron discovered that Phillips' cell was empty, with bars sawed clean and an open window. Police questioned Armour, who denied any role in helping her escape, as well as her two sisters, Ola Weaver and Etta Mae Jackson, who said that their father had left the night before to go to a downtown hotel. The police theorized that Phillips fled to Mexico and sent information to authorities there. In April 1923, police in El Salvador spotted Phillips, and on April 23 she was arrested in Tegucigalpa, Honduras; also arrested were accomplices Etta Jackson, her sister, and Jesse Carson, a journalist who had covered her trial. While jailed in Honduras, she convinced a crowd of fifteen teenage boys to help her escape, but a jail warden overheard them and arrested the boys.

Early in the morning of May 2, 1923, Phillips was transferred to Omoa Castle. On May 26 she was brought back to Los Angeles by Sheriff Eugene W. Biscailuz. It was discovered that Phillips had used Carson to obtain a saw, which she used to cut the bars, and was then lifted by Carson and two other men onto the roof of the Los Angeles jail. She and Carson spent five weeks in Los Angeles, then traveled through Texas and Louisiana before crossing the border into Mexico, where they met with Etta Jackson.

=== Life in jail ===
On June 2, 1923, guards brought Phillips back into San Quentin State Prison. She attempted to commit suicide by slitting her wrists, but then resolved to be a model prisoner for an early release.(There is no mention of this event in any California newspapers) In 1926, she asked to be allowed to temporarily leave to see her dying mother but was denied. In 1929, Phillips asked Governor C. C. Young to release her so she could become a good wife, but Young denied her request.

While in prison, Phillips studied to become a dental assistant and met a convicted burglar named Thomas Price. In September 1932, a correctional officer intercepted a love letter from Phillips to Price, which stripped her of her visitation, library, and mail rights as well as parole, as the board denied her in 1933 and 1934 due to the letters. Although Armour still stood by his wife for some time, the two stopped communicating and eventually divorced.

=== Release and aftermath ===
On June 17, 1935, Phillips was released from prison with plans to become a "useful citizen and a model housewife." She told reporters that she was going to San Diego to work as a dental assistant. Not much is known about her life afterwards, other than her changing her name and reportedly being spotted in Texas in 1961. She is buried under the name Ann C. Weaver in Greenwood Memorial Park in San Diego, California.

== In popular culture ==
- L.A. Not So Confidential, hosted by Dr. Shiloh Catanese & Dr. Scott Musgrove, talked about Phillips and the murder in 2021.
- Tenfold More Wicked, a podcast hosted by Kate Winkler Dawson, talked about Phillips in the season 4 premiere in 2022.
