= John Hawkes (actor) =

American actor (born 1959)

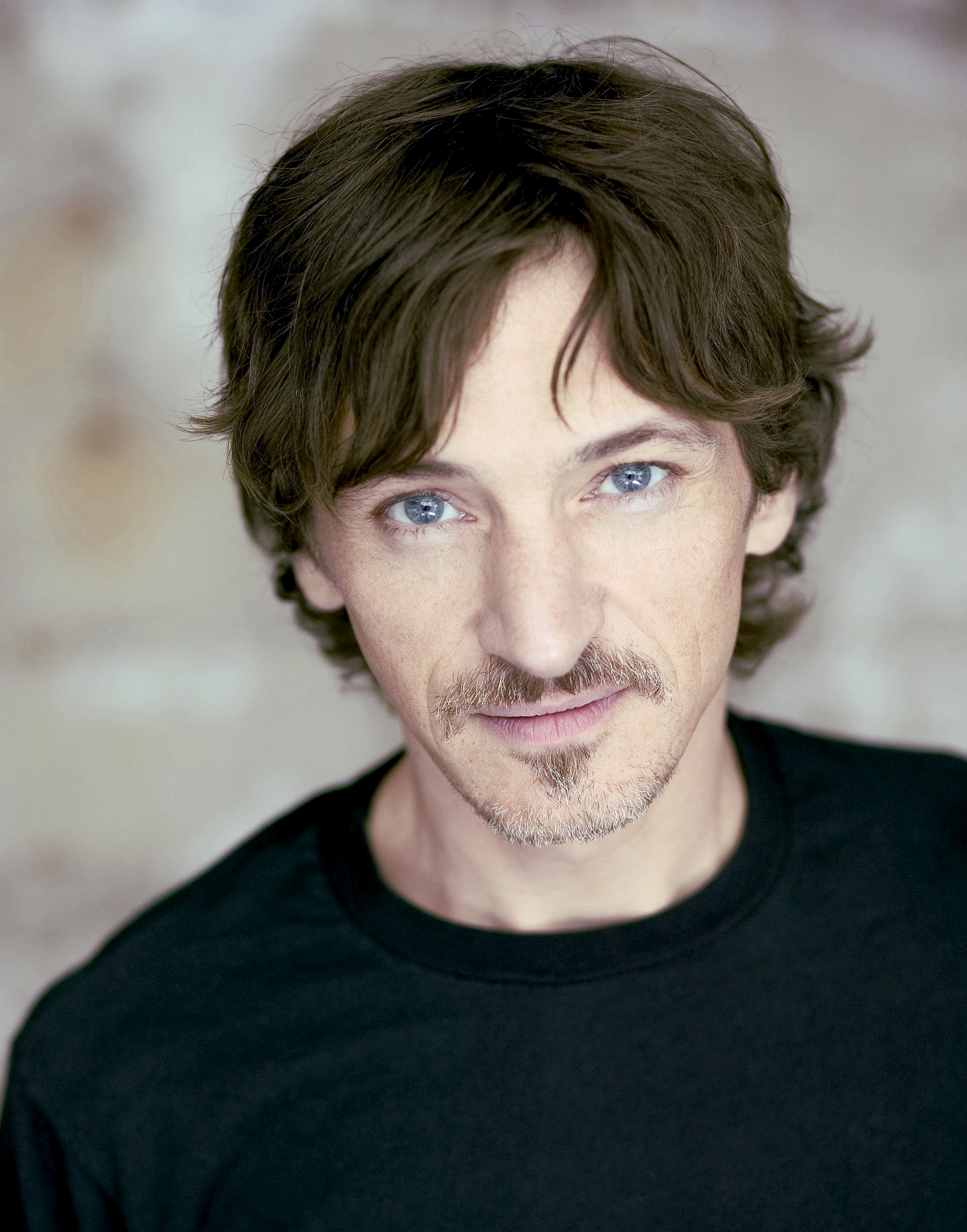
- Hawkes in 2009
- Born: September 11, 1959 (age 67)
- Education: St. Cloud State University
- Occupation: Actor
- Years active: 1984–present

John Hawkes (born September 11, 1959) is an American actor. He is the recipient of two Independent Spirit Awards and has been nominated for an Academy Award, two Primetime Emmy Awards, and a Golden Globe Award.

Hawkes is known for his roles in the films Winter's Bone (2010) and The Sessions (2012). For the former, he was nominated for an Academy Award for Best Supporting Actor and a Golden Globe Award for Best Actor – Motion Picture Drama, respectively. Some of his other film credits include From Dusk till Dawn (1996), The Perfect Storm (2000), Me and You and Everyone We Know (2005), American Gangster (2007), Martha Marcy May Marlene (2011), Lincoln (2012), and Three Billboards Outside Ebbing, Missouri (2017). He has also appeared in many television series, notably Deadwood (2004–2006) and Eastbound & Down (2009–2013), as well as the fourth season of True Detective (2024).

== Early life ==
Hawkes is the son of Patricia Jeanne (née Olson) and Peter John "Pete" Perkins, a farmer of wheat, corn, hogs and cattle. He was raised in Alexandria, Minnesota, a "pastoral, small city... a midwest Scandinavian community", and graduated from Jefferson High School. He moved to Austin, Texas, where he was a member of the bands Meat Joy, with Gretchen Phillips, and King Straggler, with fellow actors Rodney Eastman and Brentley Gore.

== Career ==
His first film role was in Future-Kill (1985), credited as John Perkins. He changed his stage name to John Hawkes because there was another actor named John Perkins.

Hawkes played the role of Greg Penticoff in season 1 of 24. From 2004 to 2006, Hawkes played merchant Sol Star on the HBO series Deadwood. He portrayed Dustin Powers, brother of protagonist Kenny Powers, on all four seasons of the HBO series Eastbound & Down, and played Lennon on ABC's Lost.

His other film roles include Me and You and Everyone We Know, The Perfect Storm, American Gangster, Wristcutters: A Love Story, Martha Marcy May Marlene, and Lincoln.

In 2011, he was nominated for an Academy Award for Best Supporting Actor for his performance in Winter's Bone, as well as for a number of other awards, including the Screen Actors Guild Award for Outstanding Performance by a Male Actor in a Supporting Role. He won the Independent Spirit Award for Best Supporting Male. Also in 2011, Hawkes was honored with a Rising Star Award by the Texas Film Hall of Fame. Hawkes was offered the role of The Governor in AMC's horror-drama series The Walking Dead. He turned it down feeling he was not the right fit for the role. The role eventually went to David Morrissey.

In 2012, the film The Sessions was considered one of the Sundance breakout hits of that year. Hawkes received two prolonged standing ovations at the film's festival premiere. It was praised by critics at the festival as "accessible, enjoyable, and light-hearted".

In 2016, it was announced that Hawkes would star in the Amazon pilot The Legend of Master Legend, which is based on the popular real-life superhero Master Legend.

Along with other cast members, Hawkes expressed interest in reprising his role as Sol Star in a proposed Deadwood film. Deadwood: The Movie began production in October 2018, and premiered on May 31, 2019. Hawkes, along with virtually the entire series cast, took part in it.

Hawkes had a small role as a robber in the music video for the cover version of the song "Crying in the Rain" by A-ha in 1990.

In the fourth season of the television series True Detective: Night Country (2024) he played a leading role and sang the song "No Use", which he wrote, in episode 5 accompanied by an acoustic guitar.

== Filmography ==
=== Film ===
Year	Title	Role	Notes
1985	Future-Kill	The Light Man	Credited as John Perkins
1988	Bar-B-Que Movie	Jerry	Short film
1988	D.O.A.	Sloane	
1988	Johnny Be Good	Pizza Boy #1	
1988	Murder Rap	Christopher / Wiseman	
1988	It Takes Two	Thief #2	
1988	Heartbreak Hotel	M.C.	
1988	Dakota	"Rooster"	
1989	Rosalie Goes Shopping	Schnucki Greenspace	
1990	Never Leave Nevada	Christo	
1991	Scary Movie	Warren	
1993	Freaked	"Cowboy"	
1993	Flesh and Bone	Groom	
1994	Roadracers	Nixer	
1995	Congo	Bob Driscoll	
1995	Night of the Scarecrow	Danny Thompson	
1995	Angry Cafe	"Turtle"	
1996	From Dusk till Dawn	Pete Bottoms	
1996	Deep in the Heart	Mac	
1997	'Til There Was You	Gawayne	
1997	Steel	Mugger	
1997	Playing God	Flick	
1998	Boogie Boy	"T-Bone"	
1998	Home Fries	Randy	
1998	Rush Hour	Stucky	
1998	Where's Marlowe?	Earl	
1998	I Still Know What You Did Last Summer	Dave	
1999	A Slipping-Down Life	David Elliot	
1999	Blue Streak	Eddie	
2000	The Perfect Storm	Michael "Bugsy" Moran	
2000	Sand	Hardy Briggs	
2001	The Orange Orange	Romeo	Short film
2001	Hardball	"Ticky" Tobin	
2002	Harold Buttleman, Daredevil Stuntman	Harold Buttleman	
2003	Identity	Larry Washington	
2004	Sweet Underground	Johnny	
2005	Me and You and Everyone We Know	Richard Swersey	
2005	The Amateurs	Moe	
2006	Wristcutters: A Love Story	Yan	
2006	Miami Vice	Alonzo Stevens	
2007	Welcome	Bill	Short film
2007	American Gangster	Freddie Spearman	Nominated – Screen Actors Guild Award for Outstanding Performance by a Cast in a Motion Picture
2008	Dark Yellow	Man	Short film
2008	Miracle at St. Anna	Herb Redneck	
2009	Tender as Hellfire	French	Short film
2009	S. Darko	Phil	
2009	Path Lights	Bobby	Short film
2009	Earthwork	Stan Herd	Winner – Fargo Film Festival for Best Actor
2009	Wasteland	Daniel	Short film
2010	Winter's Bone	"Teardrop" Dolly	Detroit Film Critics Society Award for Best Ensemble; Gotham Independent Film Award for Best Ensemble Performance; Independent Spirit Award for Best Supporting Male; San Diego Film Critics Society Award for Best Supporting Actor; San Francisco Film Critics Circle Award for Best Supporting Actor; Santa Barbara International Film Festival – Virtuoso Award; Nominated – Academy Award for Best Supporting Actor; Nominated – Alliance of Women Film Journalists Award for Best Supporting Actor; Nominated – Chicago Film Critics Association Award for Best Supporting Actor; Nominated – Detroit Film Critics Society Award for Best Supporting Actor; Nominated – Indiana Film Critics Association for Best Supporting Actor; Nominated – Online Film Critics Society Award for Best Supporting Actor; Nominated – San Diego Film Critics Society Award for Best Cast; Nominated – Screen Actors Guild Award for Outstanding Performance by a Male Actor in a Supporting Role; Nominated – Southeastern Film Critics Association Award for Best Ensemble; Nominated – St. Louis Gateway Film Critics Association Award for Best Supporting Actor; Nominated – Utah Film Critics Association Award for Best Supporting Actor; Nominated – Vancouver Film Critics Circle Award for Best Supporting Actor; Nominated – Washington D.C. Area Film Critics Association Award for Best Supporting Actor
2010	Everything Will Happen Before You Die	Lane	Also co-executive producer
2010	Small Town Saturday Night	Donnie Carson	
2010	Eve's Necklace	William	Voice
2010	On Holiday	Bill "Wild Bill"	
2011	Martha Marcy May Marlene	Patrick	Nominated – Alliance of Women Film Journalists Award for Best Supporting Actor; Nominated – Central Ohio Film Critics Association Award for Best Supporting Actor; Nominated – Gotham Independent Film Award for Best Ensemble Performance; Nominated – Independent Spirit Award for Best Supporting Male; Nominated – Online Film Critics Society Award for Best Supporting Actor; Nominated – Phoenix Film Critics Society Award for Best Supporting Actor; Nominated – St. Louis Gateway Film Critics Association Award for Best Supporting Actor; Nominated – Washington D.C. Area Film Critics Association Award for Best Supporting Actor
2011	Higher Ground	C.W. Walker	
2011	Contagion	Roger	Nominated – Phoenix Film Critics Society Award for Best Ensemble Acting
2012	The Sessions	Mark O'Brien	Independent Spirit Award for Best Male Lead; Sundance Film Festival Special Jury Prize for Ensemble Acting; Nominated – AACTA International Award for Best Actor; Nominated – Alliance of Women Film Journalists Award for Best Actor; Nominated – Broadcast Film Critics Association Award for Best Actor; Nominated – Chicago Film Critics Association Award for Best Actor; Nominated – Dallas-Fort Worth Film Critics Association Award for Best Actor; Nominated – Detroit Film Critics Society Award for Best Actor; Nominated – Golden Globe Award for Best Actor – Motion Picture Drama; Nominated – Houston Film Critics Society for Best Actor; Nominated – Online Film Critics Society Award for Best Actor; Nominated – Phoenix Film Critics Society Award for Best Actor; Nominated – San Diego Film Critics Society Award for Best Actor; Nominated – Satellite Award for Best Actor – Motion Picture; Nominated – Screen Actors Guild Award for Outstanding Performance by a Male Actor in a Leading Role; Nominated – St. Louis Gateway Film Critics Association Award for Best Actor; Nominated – Utah Film Critics Association Award for Best Actor; Nominated – Washington D.C. Area Film Critics Association Award for Best Actor
2012	Arcadia	Tom	
2012	The Playroom	Martin Cantwell	
2012	Lincoln	Robert Latham	
2013	The Pardon	Finnon "Arkie" Burke	
2013	Life of Crime	Louis Gara	
2013	Resurrection Slope	John	Short film
2013	The Sleepy Man	Sleepy Man	Short film
2014	Low Down	Joe Albany	
2015	The Driftless Area	Shane Hall	
2015	Too Late	Mel Sampson	
2015	Everest	Doug Hansen	
2017	Small Town Crime	Mike Kendall	
2017	Three Billboards Outside Ebbing, Missouri	Charlie Hayes	Broadcast Film Critics Association Award for Best Acting Ensemble; Screen Actors Guild Award for Outstanding Performance by a Cast in a Motion Picture
2017	You Will Be Loved	Birdwatcher	Short film
2018	Unlovable	Jim	
2019	The Peanut Butter Falcon	Duncan	
2019	End of Sentence	Frank Fogle	
2020	Tomahawk	Him	Short film
2021	Water and Smoke	Marvin	Short film
2022	Roving Woman	Gregory Milloy	
2026	Heartland	Clark	

=== Television ===
Year	Title	Role	Notes
1991	Sweet Poison	Jimmy	Television film
1991	The Rape of Doctor Willis	Mateson	Television film
1992	Mann & Machine	Tommy Chartraw	Episode: "The Dating Game"
1992	Nails	Harvey Cassler	Television film
1992	Northern Exposure	Inspector Jason	Episode: "Do the Right Thing"
1993	The Adventures of Brisco County, Jr.	Montana's Assistant	Episode: "Showdown"
1994	Wings	Mark, The Waiter	2 episodes
1994	Roadracers	Nixer	Television film
1994	Cool and the Crazy	"Crazy"	Television film
1994	Dead Air	Morton	Television film
1995	The Marshal	Elton Johnson	Episode: "The Great Train Robbery"
1995	Touched by an Angel	Mason Cook	Episode: "Trust"
1996	Dangerous Minds	Evan	Episode: "Bad Apple"
1996	Promised Land	Jake	Episode: "A Leap of Faith"
1996	Millennium	Mike Bardale	Episode: "The Judge"
1997	The Big Easy	Bill "Wild Bill"	Episode: "The Fabulous Bill Brothers"
1997	Pacific Blue	Paul Brent	Episode: "Excessive Force"
1997	Nash Bridges	Vaughn Smith	Episode: "Lost and Found"
1997	ER	Production Assistant	Episode: "Ambush"
1997	Profit	Dr. Jeremy Batewell	Episode: "Chinese Box"
1997	The Naked Truth	Duane Baldwin	Episode: "He Ain't Famous, He's My Brother"
1998	The Crow: Stairway to Heaven	Jake Thompson	Episode: "Death Wish"
1998	Buffy the Vampire Slayer	George	Episode: "I Only Have Eyes for You"
1998	Fantasy Island	Arnie White	Episode: "Secret Self"
1998	Brimstone	Willy Graver	Episode: "Executioner"
1999	Martial Law	Jake Simms	Episode: "Substitutes"
1999	The X-Files	Phillip Padgett	Episode: "Milagro"
1999	Nathan Dixon	Russell Keach	Pilot
2000	The Practice	Stuart Donovan	3 episodes
2001	Strange Frequency	Songwriter	Episode: "Cold Turkey"
2001	24	Greg Penticoff	2 episodes
2002	Taken	Marty Erickson	5 episodes
2003	Strange Frequency 2	Jared	Television film
2004–2006	Deadwood	Sol Star	36 episodes Nominated – Screen Actors Guild Award for Outstanding Performance by an Ensemble in a Drama Series
2007	Without a Trace	Terry Lee Wicker	Episode: "Where and Why"
2007	CSI: Crime Scene Investigation	Terry Lee Wicker	Episode: "Who & What"
2008	Monk	Matthew Teeger	Episode: "Mr. Monk and the Three Julies"
2009	Psych	Rollins	Episode: "Shawn Takes a Shot in the Dark"
2009–2013	Eastbound & Down	Dustin Powers	13 episodes
2010	Lost	Lennon	3 episodes
2012	Outlaw Country	Tarzen Larkin	Television film
2014	How and Why	Goodman Hesselman	Pilot
2015	Inside Amy Schumer	Juror #8	Episode: "12 Angry Men Inside Amy Schumer"
2016	Dr. Del	Del Canyon	Pilot
2017	The Legend of Master Legend	Frank Lafount/Master Legend	Pilot
2019	Deadwood: The Movie	Sol Star	Television film
2019	Too Old to Die Young	Viggo Larsen	5 episodes
2021	Hit-Monkey	Eli (voice)	Episode: "Home Sweet Home"
2024	True Detective	Hank Prior	Season 4 main cast Nominated – Primetime Emmy Award for Outstanding Supporting Actor in a Limited or Anthology Series or Movie; Nominated – Primetime Emmy Award for Outstanding Original Music and Lyrics
2026	The Lowdown	Jed Sallsman	
2027	Criminal	Sebastian Hyde	
